= Hong Kong–UK Reunification Campaign =

Hong Kong–UK Reunification Campaign (Yue Chinese: 香港歸英運動) is a campaign for Hong Kong to end its status as a special administrative region under the People's Republic of China, then rejoin the UK and become part of the British Overseas Territories. Supporters argue that Chinese interference in Hong Kong's affairs has violated the Sino-British Joint Declaration, and therefore the UK has the right to nullify the declaration and restore British Hong Kong. Supporters generally reference other British territories, such as Gibraltar, Falkland Islands, and Bermuda as models for Hong Kong, and believe that this arrangement would allow the city to exercise autonomy through a democratic government and elected parliament. This will also allow the local population an opportunity to decide the city's future, such as becoming a member of the British Commonwealth.

== Background ==
During the decolonization of the British Empire, most former colonies achieved independence. However, the situation for Hong Kong is somewhat different because the New Territories was legally a 99-year lease to the British as part of the Convention for the Extension of Hong Kong Territory signed in 1898. On 2 November 1972, the United Nations General Assembly voted to remove Hong Kong from the list of colonies that is in the UN Resolution 1514. During negotiations for the Sino-British Joint Declaration, the British delegation knew that the Chinese delegation opposed Hong Kong independence, and also knew that it was impractical to govern Hong Kong after the lease expired, as New Territories constituted 92% of the city's territory. As a result, both sides understood that any agreement on the Hong Kong Question would address the city as a whole.

== History ==
On 20 March 2014, Chris Patten, former governor of Hong Kong, visited Hong Kong for an event with Oxford University at the Hong Kong Maritime Museum. During the event, there were ??? who were holding British Hong Kong flag and singing God Save the Queen, and they presented their vision for Hong Kong to reunify with the UK. Patten shook hands with several participants without responding directly, and later expressed "respect for the diverse opinions in Hong Kong".

On 19 June and 1 July 2016, members of the Hong Kong–UK Reunification Campaign petitioned outside the British consulate in Hong Kong, demanding the UK nullify the Sino-British Joint Declaration and returning Hong Kong to British rule.

In July 2016, campaign leader Alice Lai registered for the 2016 Hong Kong legislative election under the Conservative Party, expressing her platform for returning Hong Kong to British rule, but was barred from running in the disqualification controversy. Afterwards, Lai wrote a petition to the British consulate in Hong Kong and the British foreign ministry for the British government to consider nullifying the Sino-British Joint Declaration and allowing Hong Kong to again join the UK.

== Opinion polling ==
In 2013, South China Morning Post conducted an online opinion poll to gauge support for Hong Kong becoming part of the British Overseas Territories. The results showed 93% of respondents supportive and 7% opposing this idea.

== See also ==
- Localism in Hong Kong
  - Hong Kong independence
    - Hong Kong Independence Party
  - Hong Kong Autonomy Movement
  - Alliance of Resuming British Sovereignty over Hong Kong and Independence
  - Conservative localism

== Related literature ==
- 凱莉塔圖; 無言; 毛來由; 紫維; 寗思. 論歸英──回到英治香港 [Discussing UK Reunification — Returning to British Hong Kong] (in Chinese (Hong Kong)). ISBN 9789881250391. Archived from the original on 14 April 2017.
