= Hong Kong nationalism =

Hong Kong nationalism (Chinese: 香港民族主義 or 香港主義) is a system of thought that spans the folklore, culture, history, geography, society, and politics of Hong Kong. It reflects a strong desire to protect democracy in Hong Kong, to oppose mainlandisation, and to preserve local Hong Kong identity.

== Overview ==
Hong Kong nationalism is generally considered a new phenomenon. The self-identification of Hongkongers became considered as nationalism when local discourse developed claims of self-determination, autonomy and varying degrees of separation from China. Hong Kong nationalists generally oppose mainlandization, seek to strengthen local Hong Kong identity, and seek to protect Hong Kong democracy.

Research by Gary Tang suggests that 'Hong Kong nationalism' is often characterized as a form of liberal nationalism; unlike traditional civic nationalism, which focuses on shared political values, Tang asserts that the ideology within the Hong Kong movement is closer to liberal culturalism. In this view, the State's role is not just to guarantee political rights, but to provide the cultural conditions for individuals to lead a good life. As such, many Hong Kong nationalists are opposed to 'Chinese state nationalism'; the latter of which is often characterized as a form of civic nationalism that supports the Chinese Communist Party. The two ideologies contradict each other as well.

== History ==
Tens of thousands of people moved to Hong Kong in 1949 to escape the Chinese Communist Revolution. The population of Hong Kong increased from 1.8 million in 1947 to 2.2 million in 1951. As many mainland Chinese fled to Hong Kong over the next 30 years, the population of Hong Kong increased by 1 million every 10 years. Those who experienced hunger and political struggle under the Chinese Communist Party (CCP) internalized stronger anti-communist sentiments than Hong Kongers who didn't experience CCP rule.

A distinct sense of Hong Kong identity existed since the 1970s, but Hong Kong nationalist sentiment didn't significantly appear until the Tiananmen massacre of 1989. Both the Tiananmen massacre and the pro-democracy movement in colonial Hong Kong strengthened feelings of division between Hong Kong and mainland China.

Since the 2010s, the Hong Kong nationalist movement has emerged as the "localist camp".

== View of the United Kingdom ==
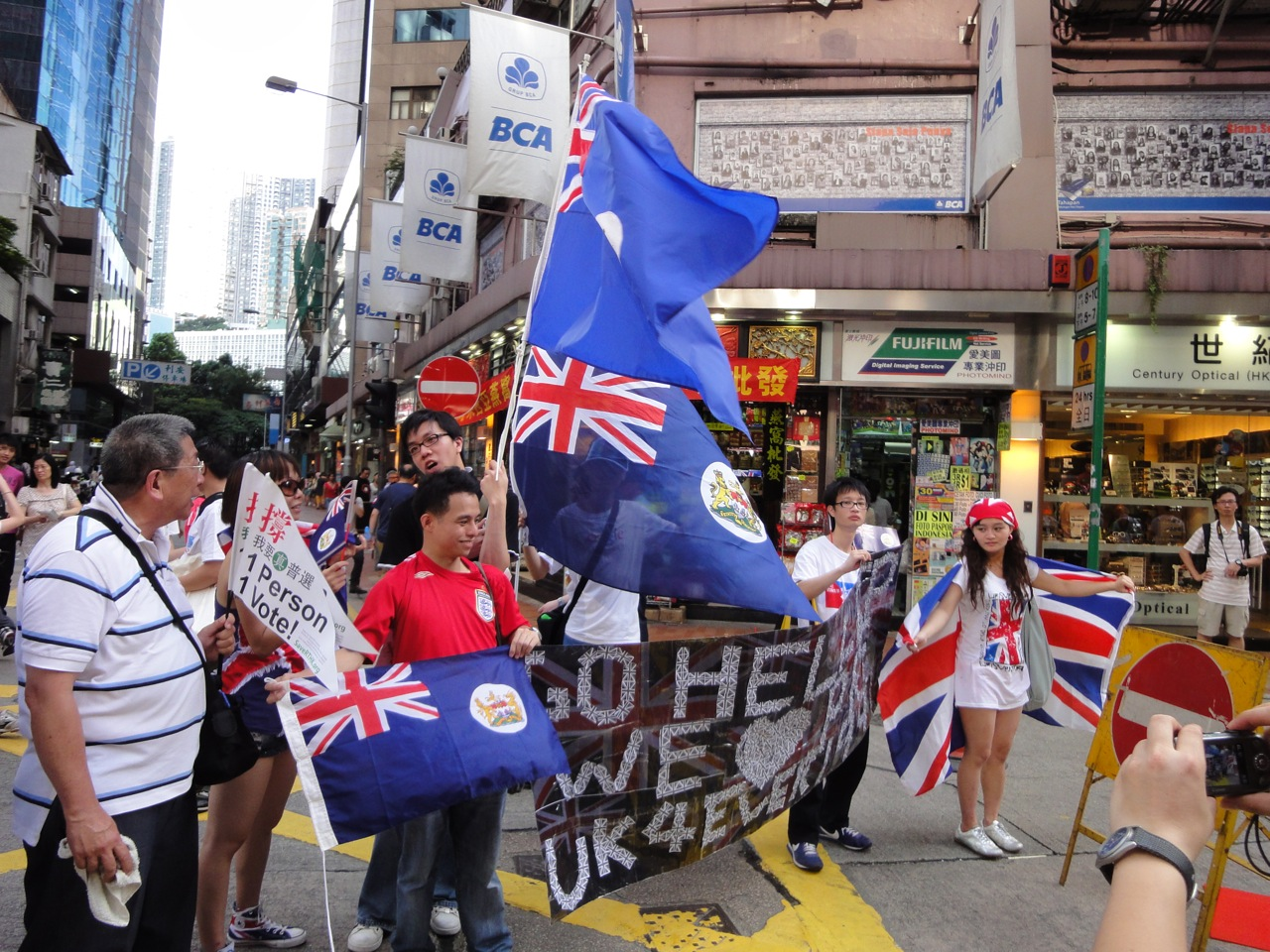
Hong Kong nationalist protesters Carrying British Hong Kong Flags (1959–1997)

In the mid-20th century, anti-colonial Hong Kong nationalism was critical of British imperialism. It distinguished itself from Chinese nationalism and advocated for regional characteristics such as Cantonese.

In the 21st century, however, some Hong Kong nationalists began to romanticize British Hong Kong as a consequence of their antipathy towards the mainland Chinese government.

== Hong Kong independence ==
Free Hong Kong flag, a flag being used at the 2019 Hong Kong protests. The flag reads: "Liberate Hong Kong, revolution of our times".

The Hong Kong independence movement is one part of Hong Kong nationalism. Hong Kong independence activists reject the doctrine of "one country, two systems" (一國兩制) and instead support "two countries, two systems" (兩國兩制). The Hong Kong independence movement is considered "radical" even within the localist camp.

== Criticism ==
Some media outlets have criticized the anti-mainland China sentiment that exists inside Hong Kong's pro-democracy movement, in part for its provocation of Chinese nationalists among the mainland population. Some have claimed that this enables Chinese Communist Party leadership to reap political gains through a hardline stance.

== Organizations ==
- Alliance of Resuming British Sovereignty over Hong Kong and Independence
- Civic Passion
- Democratic Progressive Party of Hong Kong
- Hong Kong Independence Party
- Hong Kong Indigenous
- Hong Kong National Front
- Hong Kong National Party
- Studentlocalism
- Tsz Wan Shan Constructive Power
- Youngspiration

== See also ==
- Cantonese nationalism
- Chinese imperialism, opposed by Hong Kong nationalists
- "Glory to Hong Kong"
- Hong Kong Autonomy Movement, a movement emphasizing Hong Kong identity but without supporting independence
- Hong Konger Front
- Liberalism and nationalism (Liberal ethnic nationalism)
- Local ethnic nationalism
- Shanghai National Party, an anti-communist "Shanghai nationalist" (上海民族主义) party claiming independence in Shanghai
- Stateless nation
- Taiwanese nationalism
