= Localism in Hong Kong =

Political movement

In Hong Kong, localism is a political movement centred on the preservation of the city's autonomy and local culture. The Hong Kong localist movement encompasses a variety of groups with different goals, but all of them oppose the perceived growing encroachment of the Chinese central government on the city's management of its own political, economic, and social affairs. While the movement's milder elements advocate for greater autonomy while remaining as part of China, the more radical elements call for a return to British rule or full independence as a sovereign state. Some also advocate for a more aggressive and militant stance against the mainland government in defending local interests. For that reason, they are labelled as "radicals" and "separatists" by the Chinese government. Issues of concern to the localist camp include land use and development, cultural and heritage conservation, parallel trading, and the increasing number of mainland immigrants and mainland tourists. Although grouped together with liberals, they have a distinct view as they advocate for Hongkongers' right to self-determination. In the aftermath of the 2019–2020 Hong Kong protests, localists were largely absorbed into the pro-democracy camp.

Though localist camps with different agendas and ideologies have existed since the territory's transfer of sovereignty in 1997, today's movement as a whole emerged in the early 2010s and gained significant traction following widespread protests in 2014 against the Chinese government's decision to pre-screen Chief Executive candidates before allowing them to be chosen by the general public for the 2017 election. Following these protests, a number of localist political parties were formed, organising protests and participating in Legislative Council elections. In the 2016 Legislative Council election, localist candidates won 6 of the 35 seats allocated for geographical constituencies, earning a 19 per cent share of total votes. After the election, the government took legal actions against the localist and the radical democrat legislators over the oath-taking controversy, which resulted in the disqualifications of six legislators, and furthermore, the disqualification of the candidacies of the accused "pro-independence" localist candidates.

== Terminology ==
Localism in the western context constitutes libertarian ideas of a decentralised local government as opposed to the central government, and stresses on self-sufficiency, agriculture, and communalism. Although Hong Kong localism also stresses the city's economic self-sufficiency and local democracy, it also emphasises the mainland Chinese's cultural and political threat to the city, and attempts to reinforce a Hong Kong identity as opposed to the Chinese national identity. It often includes an anti-immigration stance, and it has been said that "nativism" is synonymous with localism. Some localists call themselves "autonomists", while the Beijing government brands them as "secessionists".

== History of local consciousness in Hong Kong ==
Hong Kong was established in 1841 as a free port. The colonial government encouraged the free movement of capital and labour and there was not a strict sense of "Hong Kong residents" or "Hong Kong people". Residents were not registered by the government until 1949, a response to the influx of refugees fleeing from the Communists' takeover in mainland China.

Sociologist Lui Tai-lok in his book Four Generations of Hong Kong People, divided Hong Kong people into four generations. The first generation, he states, was the ones who were born before 1945 and had experienced the Japanese occupation of Hong Kong; while the baby boomers, the second generation born after the war, were the first wave of local consciousness.

=== First wave ===
The baby boomers were children of the refugees, but were born and raised in Hong Kong and have a strong sense of belonging. They sought to break through the Cold War rivalry between the Communists and the Nationalists which dominated the political scene at the time.

There were few advocates for decolonisation of Hong Kong from the British rule during the post-war period, notably Ma Man-fai and the Democratic Self-Government Party of Hong Kong in the 1960s. The 1970s saw unprecedented waves of student movements, such as the Chinese Language Movement and the anti-corruption movement, the defend the Diaoyu Islands movement, and so on, which were independent of the left-right spectrum and became the first wave of local consciousness. The Chinese Language Movement succeeded in having Chinese join English as an official language of Hong Kong. The student movements at the time consisted of some liberal, Chinese nationalist, and anti-colonialist elements.

In the 1960s and 70s, the colonial government also attempted to create an apolitical local consciousness in order to boost the legitimacy of the colonial rule. Under Governor Murray MacLehose's administration, Hong Kong underwent a massive decolonisation reform. The aim of creating a local identity was to raise the bid for the British side in the upcoming negotiation over Hong Kong sovereignty after 1997. The British government also carefully avoided increasing the Hong Kong people's sense of Britishness as it had already decided to prevent massive migration from Hong Kong to Britain.

=== Second wave ===
The second wave of local consciousness emerged in the 1990s as colonial rule was coming to an end. The 1989 Tiananmen Square protests and massacre sparked massive local protest and fear about the looming Chinese rule. The local cultural scene responded by consolidating enthusiasm about distinctive features and the diversity of Hong Kong culture and identity. It cited post-colonial theory, rejecting a Sinocentric form of chauvinism, and promoting the cosmopolitanism of Hong Kong as an international city, together with liberal ideals of inclusiveness, diversity, and trans-nationality. It also emphasised the importance of universal values, a diverse civil society, civic education, press and academic freedoms after 1997. In the late 1980s, established politicians, most notably Anson Chan, Chung Sze-yuen, and the Office of the Unofficial Members of the Executive and Legislative Councils (UMELCO), sought to voice the concerns on the behalf of the Hong Kong people in discussions between the Chinese and British governments. This, however, was unfruitful and saw Hong Kong's sovereignty transferred to the People's Republic of China (PRC) in 1997.

=== Third wave ===
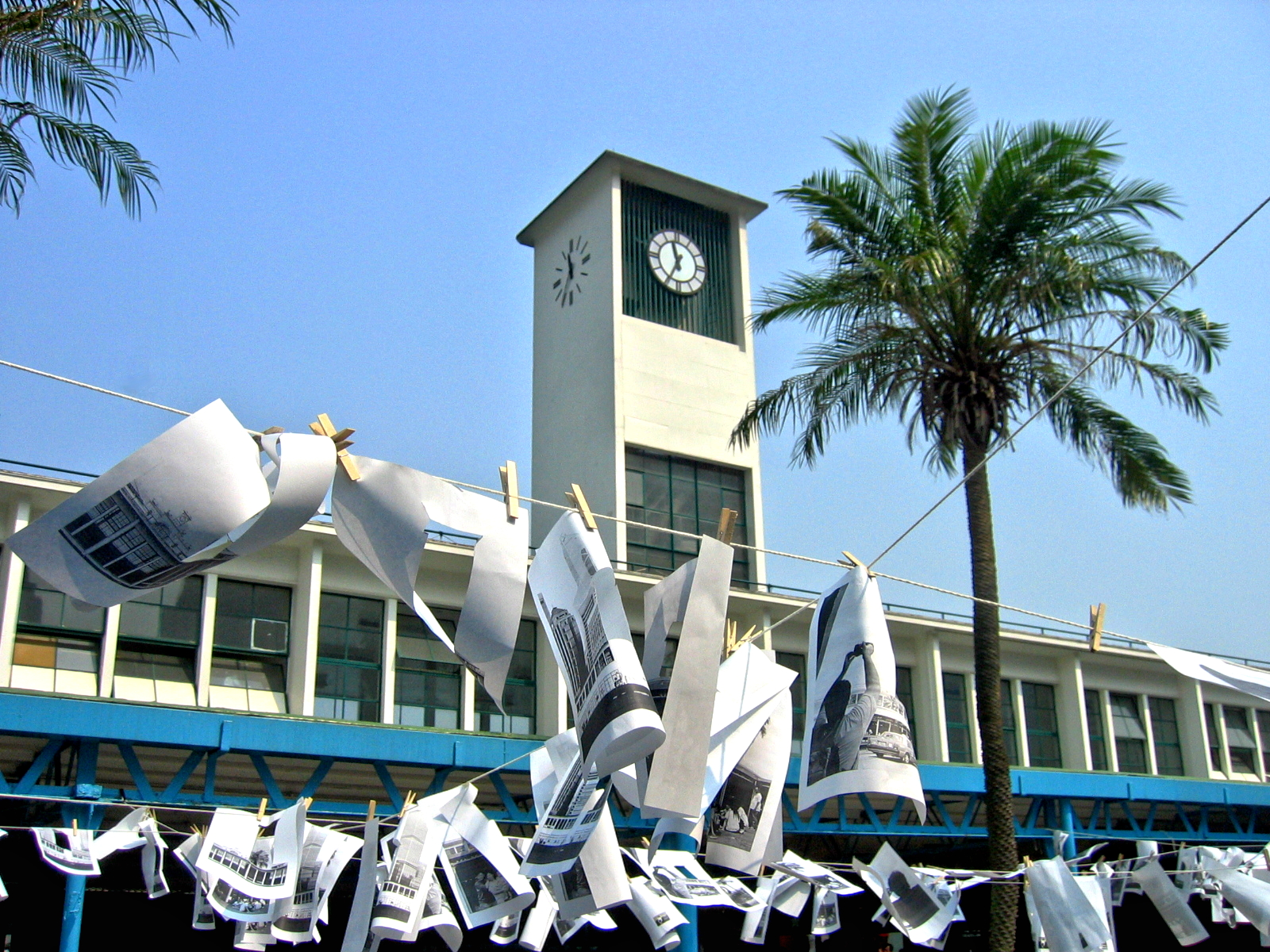
Protest against the demolition of the Edinburgh Place Ferry Pier in 2006

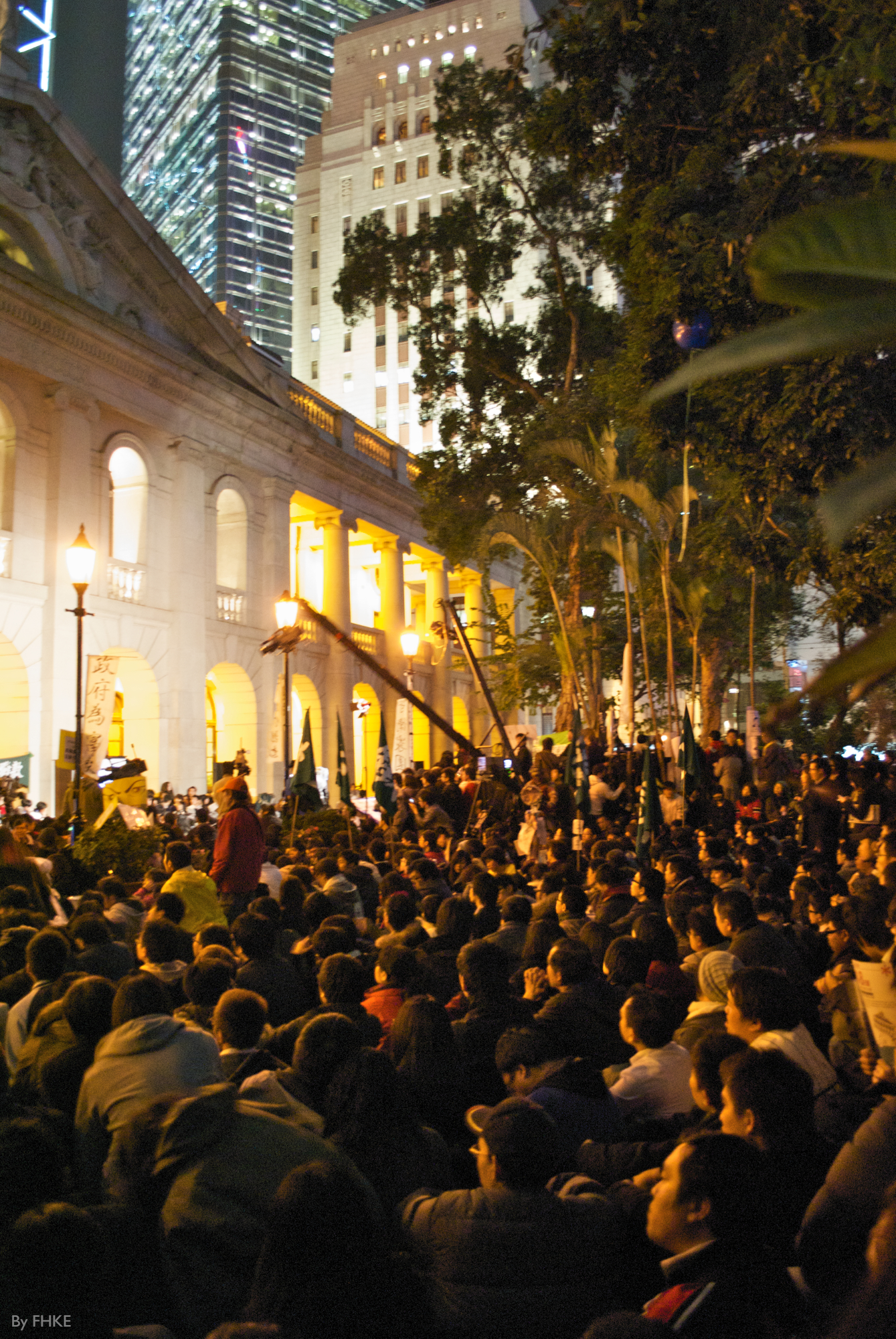
Protest against the Guangzhou–Hong Kong XRL outside of the Legislative Council building in 2010

The 1 July 2003 march recorded an estimated 500,000 to 700,000 people demonstrating against the government's proposed anti-sedition legislation, the largest protest since the public response to the 1989 Tiananmen Square protests. Many post-80s (the generation who were born in the 1980s, millennials in western terminology) were inspired by the democracy movement and came out onto the streets. 7.1 People Pile was one of the groups which emerged after the protest. They were upset by the rapid urban development which was sweeping away old neighbourhoods and communities (gentrification). They were strongly opposed to the political and economic monopoly of vested interests, collusion between business and government, and questioned the nature of the capitalist system in Hong Kong.

They were also dissatisfied with the established opposition pro-democracy camp, which they considered ineffective in challenging the system. Several conservation movements led by young activists emerged, protesting against demolition of the Edinburgh Place Ferry Pier, the Queen's Pier, and the buildings on Lee Tung Street (known as "Wedding Card Street") in 2006 and 2007. Protests against the construction of the Hong Kong section of the high-speed rail link to Guangzhou (XRL) escalated in 2009 and 2010 and established a new high point of the localist movement.

== Rise of contemporary localism ==
=== Chin Wan's city-statism ===
The failure of the peaceful anti-XRL protests damaged the reputation of the left-leaning moderate activists. Some turned to a more radical approach. Scholar Chin Wan published the book On the Hong Kong City-State in 2011, which triggered fierce public debate and was popular among the young generation. In the book, Chin suggests abandoning the hope for a democratic China and positioning the democracy movement in a "localist" perspective, in order to counter Beijing's "neo-imperialist" policies toward Hong Kong. It analysed the potential threat of the influx of mainland tourists and mainland immigrants to the established institutions and social customs of Hong Kong, which he considered likely part of a colonisation scheme by Beijing, including the increasing use of Mandarin Chinese and simplified Chinese in daily use and in schools.

He advocates "Hong Kong First" and "Hong Kong–China separation" positions in order to protect Hong Kong from "cultural genocide", arguing that Hong Kong was already highly autonomous under Britain, and had formed its own identity with the preserved Chinese culture joining with British culture and more. He suggested consolidating Hong Kong into a fully autonomous city-state Chin's view was largely accepted by Hong Kong independence advocates and those who advocate for the restoration of British rule in Hong Kong.

Since then, it has created a diversification in Hong Kong's political discussion, from reinterpreting colonial history, nostalgia for British rule, to cherishing historical or current Hong Kong culture, and various forms of anti-Chinese sentiment through different ideologies like anti-communism, Confucianism, Taoism, constitutionalism, liberalism, socialism and more. He once joined the group Hong Kong Autonomy Movement, but later left and set up his own autonomist group called the Hong Kong Resurgence Order. Another group inspired by Chin's idea and called the Hong Kong Nativism Power was set up in 2011. They protested against the inclusion of non-Hong Kong permanent residents in the HK$6,000 cash handouts program demanded by new immigrants support groups, and called for a revision of the current immigration policy.

=== Hong Kong–Mainland conflict ===
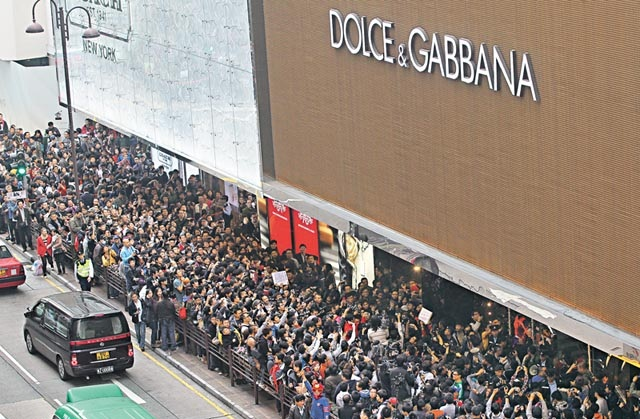
Protest in front of the Dolce & Gabbana store over the alleged discriminatory controversy

Many conflicts between Mainlanders and Hongkongers also occurred due to the influx of the tourists and immigrants, such as the Dolce & Gabbana controversy, the Kong Qingdong incident, birth tourism, and parallel trading among mainland tourists, among others. These incidents and issues intensified the anti-Chinese sentiment among the Hong Kong public. Some of them published an advertisement in local newspapers, calling Mainlanders "locusts" who steal resources from Hongkongers.

At the same time, the localists are hostile toward the pan-democracy camp, as they believed the pan-democrats' cosmopolitanism as unrealistic and their wish for a democratic China will sacrifice Hong Kong's interests. They are also dissatisfied with the believed ineffectiveness of the pan-democrats as the opposition party for the past 20 years. On the other hand, the nativist tendency of the localist movements was condemned as "xenophobic" by mainstream activists and the Chinese government.

In the 2012 Legislative Council election, some pan-democrat candidates, including Claudia Mo of the Civic Party and Gary Fan of the Neo Democrats, both claiming to be moderates, expressed some localist ideas and raised concerns on tourist and immigration policies. For that, they set up a parliamentary group called HK First. Legislator Wong Yuk-man, a strong critic of the Chinese Communist Party and a former member of People Power; and his protégé Wong Yeung-tat, leader of the activist group Civic Passion; also switched to the localist cause soon after the election.

Criticising the annual vigil to commemorate the Tiananmen Square protests and massacre held by the Hong Kong Alliance in Support of Patriotic Democratic Movements in China for having a Chinese nationalistic theme, Civic Passion organised its alternative 4 June rally in Tsim Sha Tsui. The alternative event attracted 200 people in 2013 and 7,000 in 2014, compared with 180,000 and 150,000 respectively for the main event.

In mid 2012, the government's decision to implement Moral and National Education was criticised for applauding the communist and nationalist positions of the Chinese government and attacking Western-style democracy. A student-led group, Scholarism, headed by Joshua Wong, occupied the Hong Kong government headquarters, drawing a massive protester turnout and succeeding in securing a government backdown.

=== "Hong Kong Nationalism" ===
The Undergrad, the official publication of the Hong Kong University Students' Union (HKUSU), from February 2014, published a few articles on the subject of a Hong Kong nation. Articles entitled "The Hong Kong nation deciding its own fate" and "Democracy and Independence for Hong Kong" raised the localist discourse to the level of political autonomy for Hong Kong, which in effect would be tantamount to Hong Kong independence. Chief Executive Leung Chun-ying used his 2015 New Year's policy address to direct harsh criticism at the magazine for promoting Hong Kong independence, fanning both the debate and sales of the book Hong Kong Nationalism which featured the articles.

=== Umbrella Revolution ===
In 2013, legal scholar Benny Tai, considered a moderate democrat, advocated a civil disobedience plan to pressure Beijing to implement genuine universal suffrage in Hong Kong. The plan matured into Occupy Central. The radical localists were largely against it, mainly because they believed it was a plot by pan-democrats to hijack popular support. Student activists from Scholarism and Hong Kong Federation of Students (HKFS) emerged as the leaders in the Occupy protests. They posted the slogan "self-determination of our fate" outside the government headquarters. Radical localists, many of whom criticised the occupation plan before, participated in the protests and advocated a more "militant" approach as opposed to the strict principles of non-violence advocated by the three promoters of Occupy Central and the student activists. They gathered at the Mong Kok site, as opposed to the main site in Admiralty which was led by the HKFS. They blamed the HKFS leadership for failure of the protest.

== Localism in popular culture ==
=== Identity ===
Political localism and cultural localism coexist in Hong Kong. Political localism is an idea that is the opposite of centralising government power, and which advocates for deliberative democracies. Cultural localism focuses on the popular culture side, including languages, daily lives, films, and books. It is associated with Hong Kong's typical lifestyle. Moreover, localist "Hongkonger" ideas include the mindset of separating Hong Kong people from mainland Chinese orientated identity.

Cultural localism does not completely reject the Chinese identity. It does not resist traditional Chinese culture, such as traditional customs and festivals, but rejects the present Chinese identity and contemporary Chinese culture.

=== Cantonese ===
People in Hong Kong frequently debate about Cantonese and Mandarin. Localists focus on protecting Cantonese. The dichotomy between Mandarin and Cantonese is very important for "Hongkonger" as identity confirmation. Many Hongkongers decline to use the simplified characters used in mainland China, and instead uses the traditional characters in their daily lives. Linguistics scholar Lau Chaak-ming is one who promotes the Cantonese written form, explaining that "the rise of written form Cantonese [is due] to greater awareness of a local Cantonese identity, as opposed to a more general Chinese sense of self". Although more Hongkongers have been learning and speaking Mandarin since the 1980s, some of the younger generation consciously avoids using Mandarin in their daily lives to resist the "mainlandisation of Hong Kong". While localists promote Cantonese and speak Cantonese, the Hong Kong government continues to promote and popularise Mandarin. For example, Peter Lam, the head of the Hong Kong Tourism Board, suggested popularising Mandarin by starting teaching Mandarin from kindergarten, as teaching Cantonese separated Hong Kong from mainland China.

In 2014, the Education Bureau stated that Cantonese was a "Chinese dialect that is not an official language" on its website detailing Hong Kong's language policy, sparking controversy among Hongkongers, who believe that Cantonese is a proper form of Chinese and not simply a dialect. The bureau ultimately apologised and deleted the phrase.

=== Films ===
Stakeholders hold polarised opinions about localist films. Some localist films were censored by the Hong Kong government and the Chinese government, and cannot be shown in mainstream cinemas.

Ten Years (2015)

Ten Years was produced by five localist directors. The film depicts controversies between the government and the localist camp. It nominated to be one of the best films at the 35th Hong Kong Film Awards Presentation Ceremony. An editorial published in Global Times, a tabloid owned by the Chinese Communist Party, mentioned that the film was ridiculous and promoted desperation in Hong Kong, calling it a "virus of the mind". Meanwhile, pro-Beijing newspaper Ta Kung Pao called the film a "pro-independence film". China decided to stop the live broadcast of the ceremony due to the film's politically sensitive nature. In response, one of the film's directors said that he does not see Ten Years as promoting a political agenda, but imagining the future of Hong Kong and reflecting Hong Kong's political reality.

Some theatres in Hong Kong also refused to broadcast the film despite it grossing over 6 million Hong Kong dollars. This included Broadway Circuit, one of Hong Kong's main theaters chains. In its explanation, it claimed that there were "too many films" screening at that time. A film critic and professor at the Hong Kong Academy for Performing Arts commented that he had never heard of "a film [selling] full houses at every single screening [being] pulled out from the theatres", and stated that "no exhibitor will admit to censorship or direct pressure from China". As a result, Ten Years was also shown on private screens at universities and rented places.

Lost in the Fumes (2017)

Lost in the Fumes is a documentary about Hong Kong activist Edward Leung. In 2020, Ying e Chi, an organization for independent filmmakers, asked to broadcast Lost in the Fumes, but the request was rejected by the Wong Tai Sin District Office. The Office replied that the film advocated for and praised an individual. According to Manual on the Use of the District Council Funds, "projects that may give undue credit or publicity to an individual, a commercial film, a political party or association may not be supported". Ying E Chi reaffirmed that the film was a documentary that never praised or advocated for an individual, and Ying e Chi suspected the office's decision was political censorship.

In 2021, the student union of the University of Hong Kong showed Lost in the Fumes, but the University of Hong Kong suspected that the film might violate National Security Law. The student union reaffirmed that their aim was to let students understand Hong Kong's local history, and said that they would continue the broadcast, and hoped that the university would stop restricting political freedoms.

== Self identity of Hong Kong citizens ==
The self-identity of Hong Kong citizens changes through time, mostly notably over the past 23 years.. Major events like the 2008 Beijing Olympics and the 2019–2020 Hong Kong protests were key factors that changed citizens' perception of their ethnic identity, which was conducted by the Hong Kong University Public Opinion Program (HKUPOP). In 2008, approximately 75% of Hong Kong citizens responded and identified themselves as Chinese, but by 2019, most people in Hong Kong regard themselves as Hongkongers, with a record low 11% identifying themselves as fully Chinese. The research results on citizen's categorical ethnic identity (i.e., whether citizens deemed themself as Hongkongers or as Chinese) were quoted by media from different sides of the political spectrum, including the Hong Kong Free Press and MingPao.

The most well-known research by the HKUPOP (a new organisation called HKPORI has taken the research mission) is about people's ethnic identity. The research was first started in August 1997, right after the Handover of Hong Kong. The HKUPOP team conducted telephone surveys by interviewers to target Cantonese speakers in Hong Kong age 18 or above. The sample size of these surveys was more than 500 successful cases each time. Since May 2000, the number has been increased to more than 1000 and weighted according to the gender-age distribution of the Hong Kong population. The research focuses on the categorical ethnic identity of "Chinese" and "Hongkonger," but these identities can exist non-exclusively. Thus the survey provides 7 options for respondents: Hongkonger (香港人), Hongkonger in China (中國的香港人), Chinese in Hong Kong (香港的中國人), Chinese (中國人), Hongkonger and Hongkonger in China (香港人+中國的香港人), Chinese and Chinese in Hong Kong (中國人+香港的中國人) and mixed identity (混合身分).

In the June 2008 survey, during the 2008 Sichuan earthquake and the 2008 Beijing Olympics, only 18.1% of respondents identified themselves as a "Hongkonger," while 38.6% of respondents identified themselves as "Chinese," which was the highest point throughout the 22 years survey. In the last survey conducted in June 2019, when the Anti-Extradition Law Amendment Bill Movement first started, research results show that only 10.8% of respondents identified themselves as "Chinese," and 52.9% of respondents identified themselves as a "Hongkonger," which reached the highest point since 1997. Research on citizens' categorical ethnic identity from 1997 to 2019. Demonstrates a significant increase in the categories of "Hongkonger" and "Hongkonger and Hongkonger in China," whereas the number of identifying themselves as "Chinese," "Chinese in Hong Kong," "Chinese and Chinese in Hong Kong" and "mixed identity" had decreased.

== Post-occupy localist movements ==
After the Occupy movement, several organisations named "Umbrella organisations" by the media were set up, in which many of them carried certain degree of localist discourses, notably Youngspiration and Hong Kong Indigenous. Youngspiration took part in the 2015 District Council election with many other newcoming "Umbrella soldiers" and eventually won one seat out of nine candidates. Hong Kong Indigenous is notable for its protest style, in which it calls for a "militant" approach with "some kind of clash", as opposed to pan-democrats' "gentle approach" of non-violent civil disobedience.

The Hong Kong Independence Party was formed in April 2015 advocating an independent Hong Kong within the British Commonwealth.

=== HKFS disaffiliation campaign ===
The localists' disaffection toward the HKFS resulted in a great split in the student federation. The localists launched a campaign quitting the HKFS. By the end of 2015, four of the eight student unions consisting the federation, the Hong Kong University Students' Union (HKUSU), the Hong Kong Polytechnic University Students' Union (HKPUSU), the Hong Kong Baptist University Students' Union (HKBUSU) and the City University of Hong Kong Students' Union (CityUSU), broke up with the HKFS.

=== Anti-parallel trading protests ===
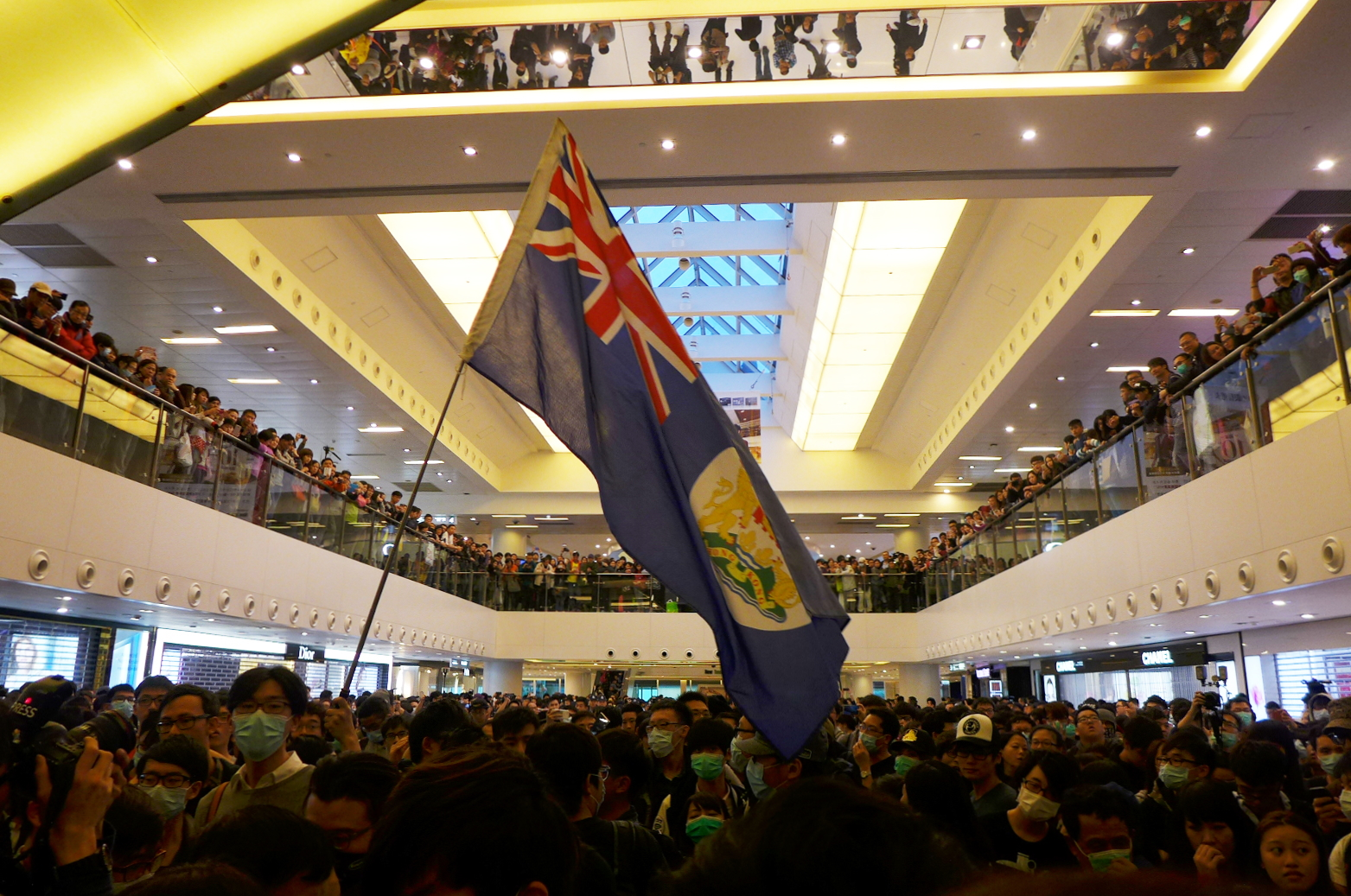
"Liberate Sha Tin" with the British Hong Kong flag raised in New Town Plaza during February 2015

The localists including Hong Kong Indigenous and Civic Passion also mobilised on the Internet and launched several "Liberate campaigns" in districts such as Tuen Mun on 8 February, Sha Tin on 15 February and Yuen Long on 1 March where parallel traders were active. Protesters were not only against the parallel traders, but also the overcrowded environment in Hong Kong caused by the multi-entry permits issued to mainland tourists. They scolded the mainland tourists, aggressively picketed the alleged shoppersand and clashed with the police, in which many of them turned violent. After the third demonstration, the central government said it would restrict Shenzhen residents to one visit a week.

=== Siu Yau-wai case ===
In July 2015, localists including Hong Kong Indigenous and Youngspiration marched to the Immigration Department to demand deportation of an undocumented 12-year-old Mainland boy Siu Yau-wai, who lived in Hong Kong for nine years without identification. Siu, whose parents are alive and well in mainland China, stayed with his grandparents after having overstayed his two-way permit nine years ago. Pro-Beijing Federation of Trade Unions lawmaker Chan Yuen-han advised and assisted the boy and his grandmother to obtain a temporary ID and pleaded for compassion from the local community. Some called on the authorities to consider the case on a humanitarian basis and grant Siu permanent citizenship while many others, afraid that the case would open the floodgates to appeals from other illegal immigrants, asked for the boy to be repatriated. The boy later returned to his parents in mainland China.

=== Mong Kok unrest ===
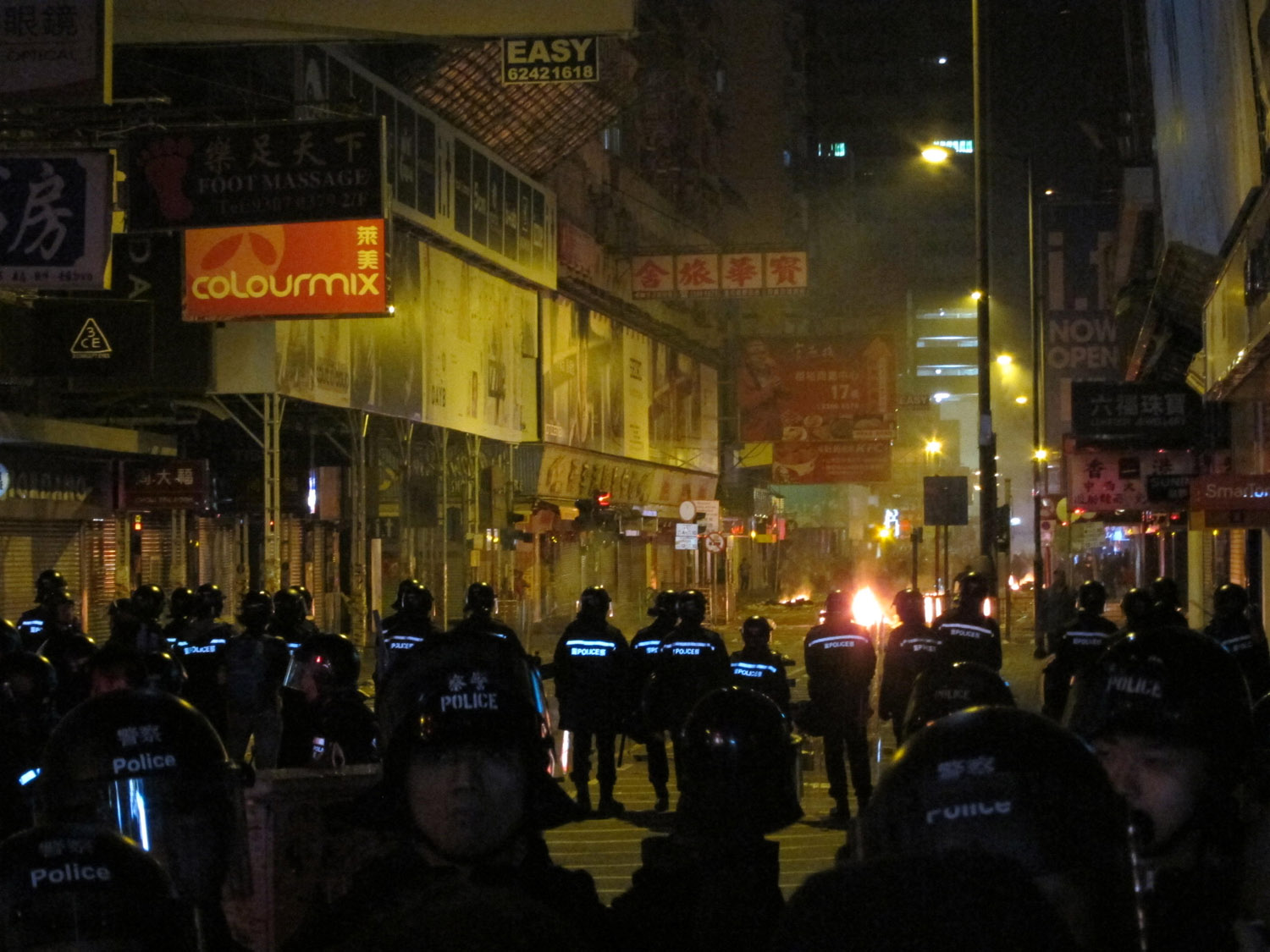
Police on Sai Yeung Choi Street South in the morning of 9 February 2016.

In February 2016 during the Chinese New Year, Hong Kong Indigenous called for action online to shield the street hawkers, who sold Hong Kong street food in which they saw as part of the Hong Kong culture, from government health department's crackdown. The protest escalated to violent clashes between the police and the protesters. The protesters threw glass bottles, bricks, flower pots and trash bins toward the police and set fires in the streets which the government condemned as riots. The Chinese Foreign Ministry for the first time labelled the involved localists as "separatists", claiming that "the riot [was] plotted mainly by local radical separatist organisation."

Hong Kong Indigenous nominated Edward Leung, who would later rise to prominence by his involvement in the Mong Kok clashes and arrest by police, in the 2016 New Territories East by-election. Localist groups and figures who campaigned for Leung included Youngspiration, Civic Passion, Chin Wan and Wong Yuk-man. Leung finished in third place, with 15 per cent of the vote, behind the moderate pan-democrat Civic Party Alvin Yeung with 37 per cent and pro-Beijing DAB's Holden Chow with 34 per cent. Leung claimed localism had gained a foothold as the third most important power in local politics, standing side by side with the pan-democracy and pro-Beijing camps. The better-than-expected result was considered to further boost the localists' morale and their ambition of running in the September general election.

=== Hong Kong independence ===
The University of Hong Kong student magazine Undergrad published an article in March 2016 headed "Hong Kong Youth's Declaration" arguing for Hong Kong independence on expiry of the Sino-British Joint Declaration in 2047. It demands a democratic government be set up after 2047 and for the public to draw up the Hong Kong constitution. It also denounces the Hong Kong government for becoming a "puppet" of the Communist Party, "weakening" the city's autonomy. Chief Executive Leung Chun-ying dismissed the claim, stating that "Hong Kong has been a part of China since ancient times, and this is a fact that will not change after 2047." University of Hong Kong council chairman Arthur Li described the idea of independence as nonsense, saying that "I don't think any wise person would listen."

Hong Kong National Party, the first party openly advocates for Hong Kong independence and a Republic of Hong Kong established on 28 March 2016, drew attacks from the Beijing and SAR governments. The State Council's Hong Kong and Macau Affairs Office issued a statement through the official Xinhua News Agency on 30 March 2016 condemning the party: "The action to establish a pro-independence organisation by an extremely small group of people in Hong Kong has harmed the country's sovereignty, security, endangered the prosperity and stability of Hong Kong, and the core interests of Hong Kong... It is firmly opposed by all Chinese people, including some seven million Hong Kong people. It is also a serious violation of the country's constitution, Hong Kong's Basic Law and the relevant existing laws." The Hong Kong government issued a statement after the formation of the party, stating that "any suggestion that Hong Kong should be independent or any movement to advocate such 'independence' is against the Basic Law, and will undermine the stability and prosperity of Hong Kong and impair the interest of the general public... The SAR Government will take action according to the law."

The Alliance of Resuming British Sovereignty over Hong Kong and Independence is the second political group to advocate a breakaway from China. Established on 26 June 2016, it aims to gain independence as the ultimate goal, but seeks to return to British rule as a transitional phase.

It is reported that about a dozen Hong Kong universities displayed large banners calling for the city's independence on China's National Day (October 1) of 2016.

== Electoral ventures and disqualifications ==
=== New Territories East by-election ===
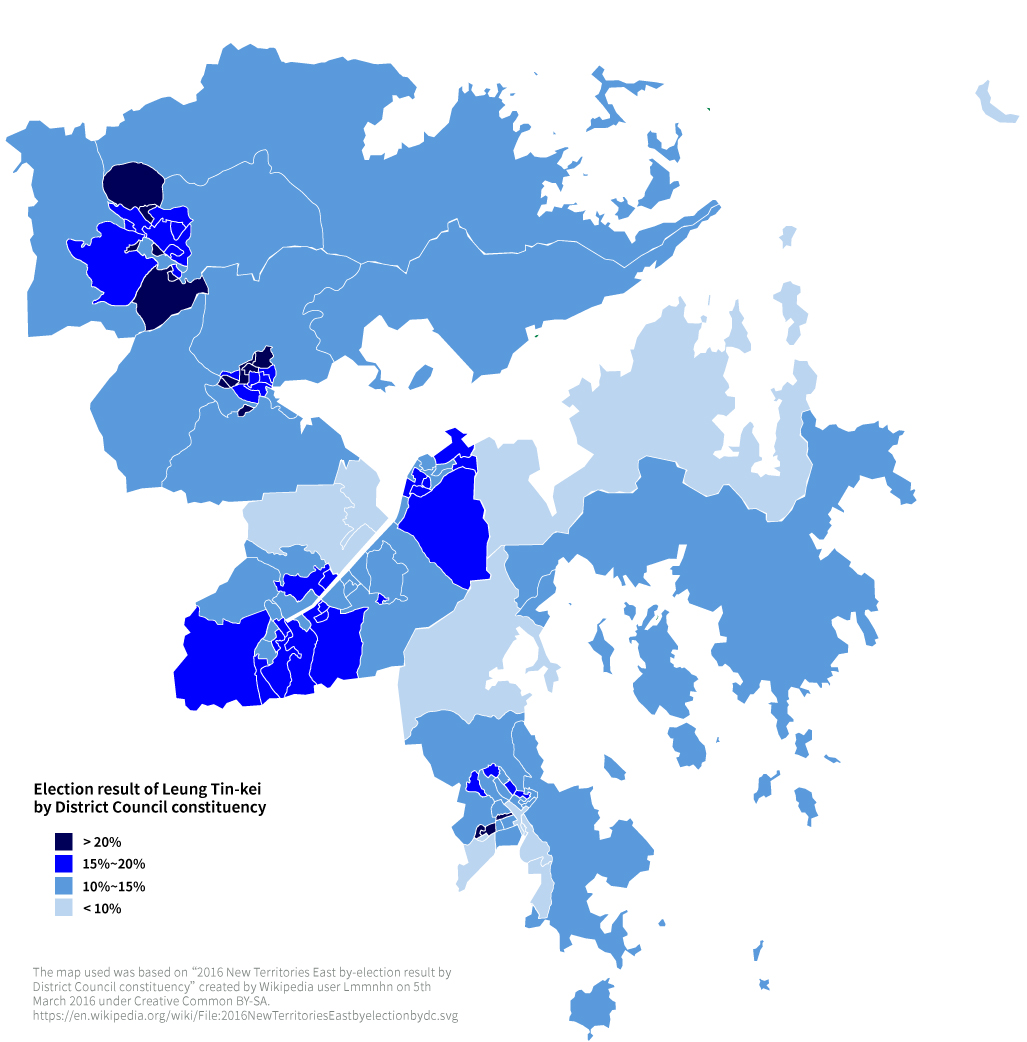
Election result of Edward Leung by District Council constituency.

In the 2015 District Council elections, a couple of localist candidates were elected including Kwong Po-yin of Youngspiration, Wong Chi-ken of Kowloon East Community and nonpartisan Clarisse Yeung.

The Legislative Council by-election in New Territories East on 28 February 2016 was a milestone of the localist movements, as it was the first attempt for them to contest for the Legislative Council under localist banner. Youngspiration was initially considering fielding a candidate and called for a primary with the pan-democratic Civic Party. It later dropped out due to the lack of time for holding a primary.

Edward Leung of Hong Kong Indigenous received a better-than expected result in the New Territories East by-election in February 2016 by taking more than 66,000 votes and gaining about 15 percent of the total votes. After the election, Leung claimed localism had gained a foothold as the third most important power in local politics, standing side by side with the pan-democracy and pro-Beijing camps.

=== 2016 Legislative Council election ===
A day after the 2016 New Territories East by-election, three localist groups, Wong Yuk-man's Proletariat Political Institute, Wong Yeung-tat's Civic Passion and Chin Wan's Hong Kong Resurgence Order, announced to run in the September Legislative Council election under the alliance "CP–PPI–HKRO". On 10 April 2016. six localist groups Youngspiration, Kowloon East Community, Tin Shui Wai New Force, Cheung Sha Wan Community Establishment Power, Tsz Wan Shan Constructive Power and Tuen Mun Community, formed an electoral alliance under the name "ALLinHK" planned to field candidates in four of the five geographical constituencies with the agenda to put forward a referendum on Hong Kong's self-determination, while Hong Kong Indigenous and another new pro-independence Hong Kong National Party also stated that they will run in the upcoming election. Demosisto, a left-leaning political party formed by Umbrella Revolution leaders Joshua Wong, Oscar Lai and Nathan Law was also formed on the same day. The political party aimed to field candidates in the upcoming election with the platform of "self-determination" of Hong Kong future. It allied with activists such as Eddie Chu and Lau Siu-lai.

On 14 July 2016, the Electoral Affairs Commission (EAC) announced its plan to require all candidates to sign an additional "confirmation form" in the nomination to declare their understanding of Hong Kong being an inalienable part of China as stipulated in the Basic Law, in response to many potential localist candidates advocating or promoting Hong Kong independence. Although Civic Passion's Alvin Cheng agreed to sign the confirmation form, other candidates including Hong Kong Indigenous' Edward Leung and Hong Kong National Party's Chan Ho-tin refused to sign. Leung subsequently signed the form the court refused to immediately hear the judicial review.

After the end of the nomination period, six localist candidates received emails from the EAC which said their nominations were "invalidated", which included Chan Ho-tin, Democratic Progressive Party's Yeung Ke-cheong, Nationalist Hong Kong's Nakade Hitsujiko, Conservative Party's Alice Lai Yee-man, Hong Kong Indigenous' Edward Leung and independent Chan Kwok-keung. New Territories East constituency returning officer Cora Ho Lai-sheung rejected Leung's nomination on the basis that she did not trust Leung "genuinely changed his previous stance for independence." Despite their localist stance, all five tickets of the CP–PPI–HKRO alliance and four tickets of the ALLinHK were validated under the Electoral Affairs Commission's (EAC) new election measure. Youngspiration's convenor Baggio Leung who initially intended to run in Hong Kong Island and stood in New Territories West finally submitted his nomination to stand in New Territories East in the wake of the EAC's measure, which he claimed to be a "substitute candidate" in case Edward Leung was disqualified in the constituency.

The localists scored a resounding victory in the election, winning six seats and securing nearly 20 per cent of the vote. Occupy student leader Nathan Law of the Demosisto became the youngest ever candidate to be elected, Polytechnic University lecturer Lau Siu-lai and Eddie Chu, were returned in the geographical constituencies Eddie Chu, a social activist and environmentalist, bagged more than 84,000 votes, the highest votes received in the geographical constituencies, without any party backing in New Territories West. After the election victory, Chu explained his slogan of "democratic self-determination" was different from the "militant" localists' slogan of "national self-determination" as he disagreed with the notion of nationalism. For the "militant" faction, Baggio Leung, leader of Youngspiration won in New Territories East after his ally, Hong Kong Indigenous' Edward Leung was barred from poll while Yau Wai-ching won last seat in Kowloon West by about 400 votes at the expense of veteran Wong Yuk-man of the Proletariat Political Institute. Wong's ally, Civic Passion leader Wong Yeung-tat also lost in his second bid in Kowloon East. Only Cheng Chung-tai from the electoral alliance won a seat in the New Territories West.

=== LegCo oath-taking controversy ===
In October 2016, the two Youngspiration legislators Baggio Leung and Yau Wai-ching were sued by the government for their oath-taking. The two claimed that "As a member of the Legislative Council, I shall pay earnest efforts in keeping guard over the interests of the Hong Kong nation," displayed a "Hong Kong is not China" banner, inserted their own words into the oaths and mispronounced "People's Republic of China" as "people's re-fucking of Chee-na" when they took the oath. In November, the spokesman of the Hong Kong and Macau Affairs Office stated that "[Beijing] will absolutely neither permit anyone advocating secession in Hong Kong nor allow any pro-independence activists to enter a government institution," after the National People's Congress Standing Committee (NPCSC) interpret the Article 104 of the Basic Law of Hong Kong which aimed to disqualify the two legislators. On 14 July 2017, the court unseated four more pro-democracy legislators, including Demosisto's Nathan Law and Lau Siu-lai who ran their campaign with "self-determination" slogan.

== Localist figures and organisations ==
Politicians and office holders

- Cheng Chung-tai
- Eddie Chu
- Gary Fan
- Lau Siu-lai
- Ventus Lau
- Nathan Law
- Baggio Leung
- Claudia Mo
- Wong Yuk-man
- Yau Wai-ching

Intellectuals, writers and activists

- Chan Ho-tin
- Alvin Cheng
- Chin Wan
- Chapman To
- Cheng Lap
- Hung Ho-fung
- Edward Leung
- Ray Wong
- Roy Tam
- Deanie Ip
- Kengo Ip
- Chip Tsao
- Gregory Wong
- Wong Yeung-tat

Magazines and media

- Channel i
- Local Press
- MyRadio
- Passion Times
- The Undergrad

Organisations

- Alliance of Resuming British Sovereignty over Hong Kong and Independence
- Christians to the World
- Civic Passion
- Conservative Party
- CUHK Local Society
- Democracy Groundwork
- Democratic Progressive Party of Hong Kong
- Demosistō
- Green Sense
- HK First
- Hong Kong National Front
- Hong Kong Autonomy Movement
- Hong Kong Civile Party
- Hong Kong Independence Party
- Hong Kong Indigenous
- Hong Kong Localism Power
- Hong Kong National Party
- Hong Kong Resurgence Order
- Hong Konger Front
- Hongkongers Priority
- Kowloon East Community
- Land Justice League
- Liber Research Community
- Nationalist Hong Kong
- Neo Democrats
- North District Parallel Imports Concern Group
- Proletariat Political Institute
- Sha Tin Community Network
- Studentlocalism
- Tai Po Sunwalker
- Tin Shui Wai New Force
- Tsz Wan Shan Constructive Power
- Youngspiration

== See also ==
- Localist camp (Hong Kong)
- Hong Kong nationalism
  - Hong Kong independence
- Hong Kong 47
- Local ethnic nationalism (Mainland China)
- Opposition to immigration
- Taiwan localization movement
- Cultural conservatism
- United front in Hong Kong

=== Other ideologies in Hong Kong ===
- Anarchism in Hong Kong
- Centrism in Hong Kong
- Conservatism in Hong Kong
- Liberalism in Hong Kong
- Socialism in Hong Kong
