= 2016 Hong Kong Legislative Council candidates' disqualification controversy =

A controversy arose during the 2016 Legislative Council election in Hong Kong as the Electoral Affairs Commission (EAC) banned six potential localist candidates from running for the Legislative Council of Hong Kong (LegCo). The EAC carried out a new election measure to require all candidates to sign an additional "confirmation form" in the nomination to declare their understanding of Hong Kong being an inalienable part of China as stipulated in Article 1, Article 12 and Article 159(4) of the Basic Law of Hong Kong.

Localist Hong Kong Indigenous's Edward Leung and pan-democrat League of Social Democrats (LSD) Avery Ng sought a judicial review but the court refused to immediately hear the judicial reviews. Leung subsequently signed the confirmation form but was asked by returning officers whether they would still advocate independence along with some other localist candidates including Civic Passion's Alvin Cheng and Hong Kong National Party's Chan Ho-tin.

After the end of the nomination period, nominations of six localist candidates, Hong Kong National Party's Chan Ho-tin, Democratic Progressive Party's Yeung Ke-cheong, Nationalist Hong Kong's Nakade Hitsujiko, Conservative Party's Alice Lai Yee-man, Hong Kong Indigenous's Edward Leung and independent Chan Kwok-keung, were "invalidated"; Edward Leung's nomination was rejected by EAC returning officer Cora Ho Lai-sheung on the basis that she did not trust Leung had "genuinely changed his previous stance for independence."

== Course of events ==
=== Confirmation form ===
On 14 July 2016, the Electoral Affairs Commission (EAC) announced its plan to require all candidates to sign an additional "confirmation form" in the nomination to declare their understanding of Hong Kong being an inalienable part of China as stipulated in Article 1 of the Basic Law, Article 12 which stated that the Hong Kong Special Administrative Region (HKSAR) shall be a local administrative region of the People's Republic of China (PRC), which shall enjoy a high degree of autonomy and come directly under the Central People's Government, as well as Article 159(4) which stipulated that no amendment to the Basic Law shall contravene the established basic policies of the PRC regarding Hong Kong (i.e. Hong Kong should be a special administrative region of the PRC under the “one country, two systems” principle). Article 104 also required members of the Legislative Council to swear to uphold the Basic Law and swear allegiance to the Hong Kong Special Administrative Region before assuming office.

As many potential localist candidates are advocating or promoting Hong Kong independence, the EAC stated that “independence of the HKSAR” was inconsistent with the constitutional and legal status of the HKSAR as stipulated in the Basic Law, as well as the established basic policies of the PRC regarding Hong Kong. It also stated that returning officers were required to take into account all relevant information before deciding whether a nomination is valid according to Legislative Council Ordinance (Cap. 542) § 42A and Electoral Affairs Commission (Electoral Procedure) (Legislative Council) Regulation 541D § 16 (the Regulation) and request the candidate to provide any other information the returning officer deems appropriate to satisfy him/her that the nomination is valid according to Sections 10 or 11 of the Regulation. Hong Kong Human Rights Monitor director Law Yuk-kai criticised the government's move as "censorship of political ideas" and a breach of freedom of thought.

Localist candidates reacted differently to the new measure. Civic Passion's Alvin Cheng signed the confirmation form when he submitted his nomination to run in the Hong Kong Island constituency. Civic Passion spokesman and New Territories West candidate Cheng Chung-tai justified the group's decision as a form of civil disobedience.

Edward Leung of the pro-independence Hong Kong Indigenous who won over 66,000 votes in February's New Territories East by-election said he would not sign the form and would seek a judicial review. The pan-democrats also stated they would boycott the new election measure by not signing the additional form.

=== Returning officers' emails ===
On 22 July, Edward Leung, who had not yet signed the confirmation form, received email from the EAC asking if he would still advocate Hong Kong independence after submitting the original nomination form stating he would uphold the Basic Law and pledge allegiance to the Hong Kong Special Administrative Region. Civic Passion's Alvin Cheng and the Hong Kong National Party's Chan Ho-tin both received similar emails on 25 July. Two other localist candidates, Nationalist Hong Kong's Nakade Hitsujiko and Conservative Party's Alice Lai Yee-man, received similar emails in the following days. Those questions were claimed to be a factor to determine the validity of their nominations.

=== Judicial review attempt ===
Represented by Senior Counsel Martin Lee, Edward Leung and pan-democrat League of Social Democrats (LSD) chairman Avery Ng and general secretary Chan Tak-cheung filed a judicial review, arguing that the EAC had acted beyond its powers, and accuse the government of political censorship. On 27 July, High Court judge Justice Thomas Au Hing-cheung refused to immediately hear the judicial reviews, as he said he saw no urgency in dealing with the case before the end of the nomination period. After the court's decision, Leung agreed to sign the confirmation form.

=== Invalidations ===
On 30 July, Chan Ho-tin received an email from the EAC which said his nomination in New Territories West had been "invalidated" as he did not comply with the Legislative Council Ordinance (Cap. 542) § 40(1)(b), since he had refused to sign the additional confirmation form.

A day after, Yeung Ke-cheong of the localist Democratic Progressive Party, positioned second on a candidate list with Jonathan Ho Chi-kwong in Kowloon West was also invalidated as he, unlike Chan, explicitly rejected the Basic Law by not signing both the original and additional confirmation forms to pledge to uphold the Basic Law. Yeung said he would launch a judicial review.

Pro-independence candidate Nakade Hitsujiko for New Territories West became the third candidate to be disqualified on 1 August even though he had signed the new form. He had also previously run in 2015 District Council election.

On 2 August, three more localist candidates were disqualified, Conservative Party's Alice Lai Yee-man in Hong Kong Island, Hong Kong Indigenous' Edward Leung who ran in February and received more than 66,000 votes in the New Territories East by-election and independent Chan Kwok-keung in New Territories East while nominations of Clarence Ronald Leung Kam-shing and Yau Man-king on Chan's list were validated. In her letter, EAC returning officer Cora Ho Lai-sheung rejected Leung's nomination with the attachment of Leung's Facebook posts, newspaper clippings and cited transcripts of his remarks at press conferences, and stated that although Leung had signed the forms, she did not believe that Leung "genuinely changed his previous stance for independence."

=== Lawyers' joint statement ===
On 3 August, all 30 Legal Subsector members of the 1,200-strong Election Committee, which is responsible for choosing Chief Executive of Hong Kong including former Hong Kong Bar Association chairmen Edward Chan King-sang SC and Philip Dykes SC questioned whether returning officers had the power to investigate the “genuineness” of candidates’ declarations and accordingly disqualify their candidacies. In the statement, it wrote that "[the Section 40 of the Legislative Council Ordinance] does not give the returning officer any power to inquire into the so-called genuineness of the candidates’ declarations, let alone making a subjective and political decision to disqualify a candidate without following any due process on the purported ground that the candidate will not genuinely uphold the Basic Law." It also wrote that "arbitrary and unlawful exercise of powers by government officials ... are most damaging to the rule of law in Hong Kong."

However, Secretary for Justice Rimsky Yuen said officers did have the power to consider some evidence, as they had done in the past. He did not specify any past cases.

=== "First pro-independence rally" ===
On 5 August, the Hong Kong independence advocates who were banned from the election launched a rally which was dubbed “first pro-independence rally in Hong Kong”. The rally drew about 2500 people. The pro-independence activists vowed they would press on with their cause and campaign for wider public support.

== See also ==
- 2020 Hong Kong Legislative Council candidates' disqualification controversy
- Hong Kong independence
- Hong Kong Legislative Council oath-taking controversy
- Localism in Hong Kong
