= Hong Kong Localism Power (2011) =

- Traditional Chinese: 香港本土力量
Transcriptions
Yue: Cantonese
- Yale Romanization: Hēung góng bún tóu lihk leuhng
- Jyutping: Hoeng^{1} gong^{2} bun^{2} tou^{2} lik^{6} loeng^{6}

Hong Kong Localism Power (Chinese: 香港本土力量; HKLP), formerly called Hong Kong Nativism Power, was an internet-based localist political organisation formed in March 2011. It advocated the protection of the values and culture of Hong Kong people in the face of the growing influences of mainland China and the influx of mainland immigrants in Hong Kong after the handover of Hong Kong to China in 1997. The group was dissolved in January 2012.

== Platform ==
Members of the organisation participated in a major anti-government rally on 6 March 2011 which received media attention. They opposed a demand from new immigrant support groups for inclusion of non-Hong Kong permanent residents in a government HK$6,000 cash handout. The participants also called for a revision of immigration policy.
