= Hong Kong Civile Party =

Hong Kong Civile Party 香港市民黨
- Leader: Chin Wan
- Founder: Chin Wan
- Founded: 1 March 2021
- Ideology: Hong Kong localism Constitutionalism; Libertarianism; Cultural conservatism Anti-Liberal elite Hong Kong autonomism Anti-separatism
- Political position: Right-wing
- Regional affiliation: Pro-constitutional amendment camp
- Colours: Blue; White
- Legislative Council: 0 / 90

Website
- Instagram page

The Hong Kong Civile Party (Chinese: 香港市民黨) is a Hong Kong political party established in March 2021. It was founded by a localist scholar Chin Wan and a group of young Hong Kong people who support localism in Hong Kong.

== Foundation ==
The Hong Kong Civile Party opened a Facebook page on 28 February 2021, and issued a party creation statement on 1 March, which officially began operations.

The party was named "civile", a term coined in the Roman Empire, which means that the people who live there can be safe and profitable, take care of the dignity and interests of the suzerain, do things in harmony, and do what is good.

== Goals ==
The Hong Kong Civile Party advocates the implementation of the Basic Law and "One Country, Two Systems", and is committed to safeguarding Hong Kong's status as the Asia-Pacific financial center, giving full play to Hong Kong's special status and role within the framework of mainland China, and improving the current international trade relations between the People's Republic of China and other countries in the world.

== See also ==
- Chin Wan
- Hong Kong Autonomy Movement
