= Hong Konger Front =

Hong Kong political organisation

Flag of Hong Konger Front

Hong Konger Front (Chinese: 我是香港人連線; lit. 'I am a Hongkonger Connection') is a bilingual website founded in 2004 to advocate for Hong Kong's gaining independence from China and building the Republic of Hong Kong. The website was covered by media conveying condemnation from both China and Hong Kong's pro-Beijing politicians.

In the beginning, its call for Hong Kong independence was not echoed by Hong Kong's localist groups, not to mention moderate democrats who preferred waiting for One country, two systems and universal suffrage, both promised by Beijing years before the 1997 Handover of Hong Kong and enshrined in the Basic Law (constitution) of Hong Kong.

Unlike the other Hong Kong pro-independence groups, Hong Konger Front goes further to support the separation of Inner Mongolia, Taiwan, Tibet, Xinjiang, and China's southern, eastern and northeast provinces from the People's Republic of China, as shown in a map on its website.

== See also ==
- Hong Kong Basic Law Article 45
