= Alliance of Resuming British Sovereignty over Hong Kong and Independence =

Alliance of Resuming British Sovereignty over Hong Kong and Independence 香港歸英獨立聯盟
- Founded: 26 March 2016; 9 years ago
- Membership: ~30
- Ideology: Localism (HK); Hong Kong nationalism
- Colours: Dark blue

Alliance of Resuming British Sovereignty over Hong Kong and Independence
- Traditional Chinese: 香港歸英獨立聯盟
- Simplified Chinese: 香港归英独立联盟
Transcriptions
Standard Mandarin
- Hanyu Pinyin: Xiānggǎng guī yīng dúlì liánméng
Yue: Cantonese
- Yale Romanization: Hēung góng gwāi yīng duhk laahp lyùhn màhng
- Jyutping: Hoeng^{1} gong^{2} gwai^{1} jing^{1} duk^{6} laap^{6} lyun^{4} mang^{4}

The Alliance of Resuming British Sovereignty over Hong Kong and Independence (Chinese: 香港歸英獨立聯盟; RBSI) is a localist camp political party in Hong Kong. The party aims to repeal the Sino-British Joint Declaration, resume British sovereignty, then make Hong Kong an independent state.

== Platform ==
The party does not recognise the Sino-British Joint Declaration and their identity as ethnic Chinese. It defines a Hong Kong national as someone born to parents who had gained right of abode in the city before 1997.

It calls for a 10 per cent sales tax for all “non-Hong Kong” shoppers, cancellation of the one-way permit system to halt an influx of mainland migrants, dumping all books written in simplified Chinese characters in public libraries, and awarding infrastructure projects to Britain in exchange for military protection by the British Commonwealth. It will seek independence within the constitutional framework of the Commonwealth.

== Background ==
It was founded on 26 June 2016 by its convenor Billy Chiu Hin-chung. Chiu was a member of the League of Social Democrats and founded the localist camp protest group Hongkongers Priority. Chiu and several others broke into the People's Liberation Army Hong Kong Garrison in Admiralty in 2013 while waving a colonial-era Hong Kong flag and demanded the PLA to “get out of Hong Kong”. He was sentenced a two-week suspended jail term for entering a closed area without a permit.

It had about 30 members when it was founded but claimed it had overseas support, with prominent Taiwanese independence campaigners Shih Chao-hui and Wang San-chi serving as “honorary consultants”.

The party also planned to field candidates in each geographical constituency in the 2016 Legislative Council election.

On 27 June 2016, one day after the establishment of the party, the party announced a statement on its Facebook page stating that its convenor Billy Chiu Hin-chung had left the party, citing a difference in opinion on the issue of independence, as the party believed that Hong Kong could benefit most under a constitutional monarchy like Australia, New Zealand, and Canada, while Chiu sought a Hong Kong republic.

== See also ==
- Hong Kong independence movement
- Hong Kong National Party
- Localism in Hong Kong
