= Article 45 =

Clause of the Hong Kong Basic Law

Article 45 is an article of the Hong Kong Basic Law. It states that the Chief Executive should be chosen by universal suffrage upon nomination by a broadly representative nominating committee as an eventual goal.

== Content of Article 45 ==
Article 45 gives the requirements for choosing the Chief Executive:

"The Chief Executive of the Hong Kong Special Administrative Region shall be selected by election or through consultations held locally and be appointed by the Central People's Government."

"The method for selecting the Chief Executive shall be specified in the light of the actual situation in the Hong Kong Special Administrative Region and in accordance with the principle of gradual and orderly progress. The ultimate aim is the selection of the Chief Executive by universal suffrage upon nomination by a broadly representative nominating committee in accordance with democratic procedures."

Details of procedures to be adopted are found in Annex I to the Basic Law where the same expression "broadly representative" is used to describe the constituency of the Election Committee notwithstanding its only representing a tiny section of the total number of registered electors.

== Background ==
Paragraph 3 of Annex I Section I of the Sino-British Joint Declaration provides the corresponding backing for art.45:

"The chief executive will be appointed by the Central People's Government on the basis of the results of elections or consultations to be held locally."

The earlier version of Article 45, from December 1987 (Article 45 in 1987), contained the details of the methods for selecting the Chief Executive, which was put in the Annex I to the April 1988 version and then in the enacted version. The Hong Kong Basic Law Consultative Committee noted that opinions were expressed on several areas of the article, including whether the Chief Executive should be appointed by the Central People's Government; that consultation is not as democratic as direct or indirect elections; and that the clause “in accordance with the principle of gradual and orderly progress” is vague and difficult to define legally.

== See also ==
- Article 45 Concern Group
- Democratic development in Hong Kong
- 2005 Hong Kong Chief Executive election
- Politics of Hong Kong
