= Democratic Progressive Party of Hong Kong =

Democratic Progressive Party 民主進步黨
- Chairman: Yeung Ke-cheong
- Founded: c. 2015
- Dissolved: March 23, 2017
- Ideology: Localism (HK); Progressivism; Social liberalism
- Political position: Centre-left
- Regional affiliation: Pro-democracy camp Pro-Taiwan camp (Note: The party aligned more closely with Taiwan's Pan-Green Coalition led by the Democratic Progressive Party than the Kuomintang-led Pan-Blue Coalition.)
- Colours: Green and yellow

The Democratic Progressive Party (Chinese: 民主進步黨) was a small localist political party in Hong Kong established by Yeung Ke-cheong (楊繼昌) in 2015. It considered Chinese rule in Hong Kong foreign and promoted the right of Hong Kongers to self-determination.

The party advocated non-violent struggle against what it saw as Chinese colonial rule, in sharp contrast to the more strident localists of Civic Passion and Hong Kong Indigenous. Yeung, the party's chairman, also hosted an online programme critical of other localists, especially Yeung's former mentor Wong Yuk-man, for their militant and populist tendencies.

In the 2016 Hong Kong Legislative Council election, Yeung formed a joint ticket with Hong Kong Localism Power's Jonathan Ho Chi-kwong. Yeung's candidacy was disqualified by the Electoral Affairs Commission as he did not sign both the original and additional confirmation forms to pledge to uphold the Hong Kong Basic Law. He campaigned for Ho who defeated incumbent Wong by a margin of 424 votes.

On 26 March 2017, party chairman Yeung Ke-cheong announced the dissolution of the party.

== See also ==
- League of Social Democrats
- Pro-Taiwan camp (disambiguation)
