= Hong Kong independence movement =

Independence movement in China

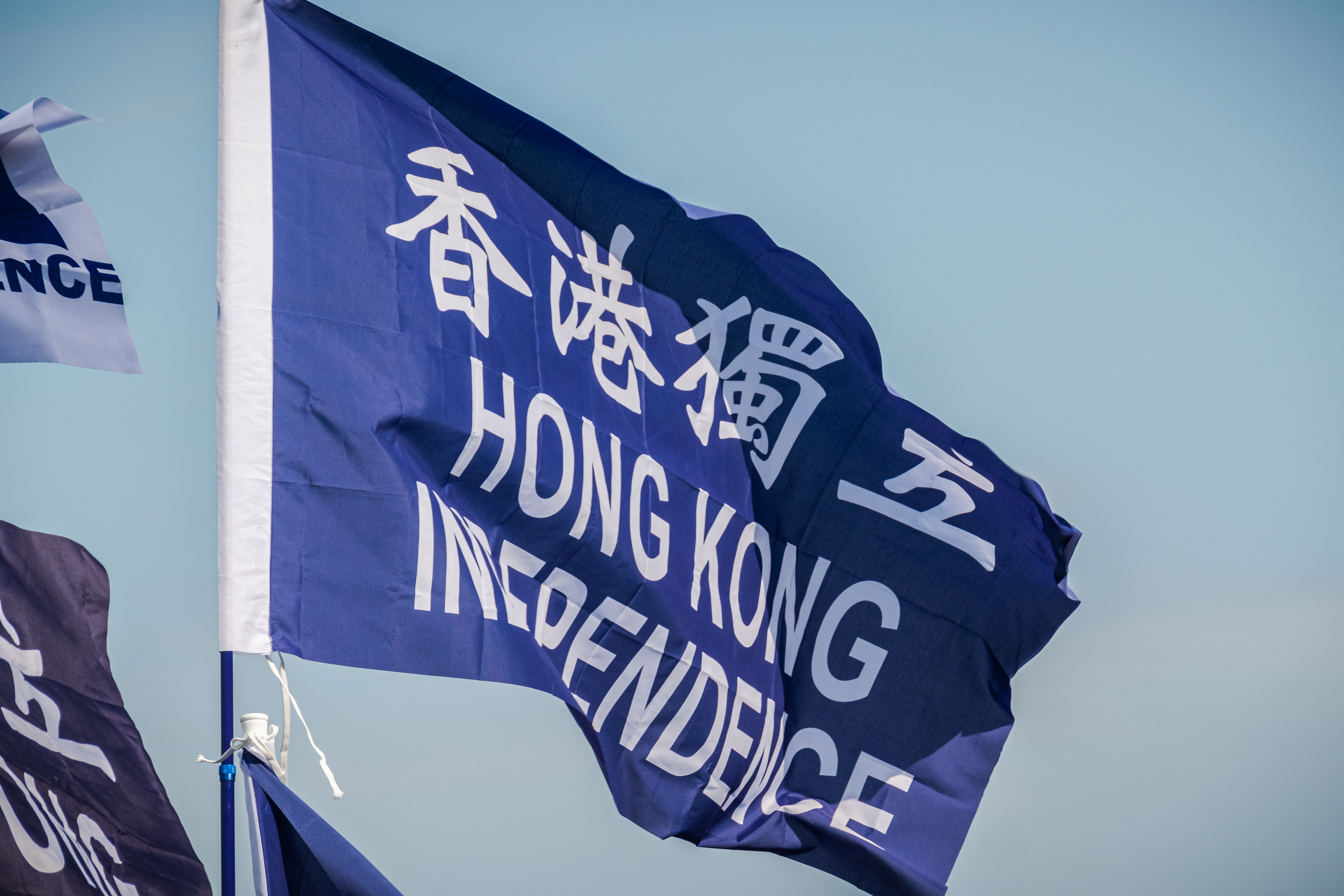
- A flag reading "Hong Kong independence" in Chinese and English at a protest in 2020.
- Traditional Chinese: 香港獨立運動
- Simplified Chinese: 香港独立运动
- Jyutping: hoeng^{1} gong^{2} duk^{6} laap^{6} wan^{6}dung^{6}
Transcriptions
Standard Mandarin
- Hanyu Pinyin: Xiānggǎng dúlì yùndòng
- Wade–Giles: Hsiang^{1}-kang^{3} tu^{2}-li^{4} yün^{4}-tung^{5}
Yue: Cantonese
- Yale Romanization: hēung góng duhk lahp wahn duhng
- Jyutping: hoeng^{1} gong^{2} duk^{6} laap^{6} wan^{6}dung^{6}

Abbreviation
- Traditional Chinese: 港獨
- Simplified Chinese: 港独
- Jyutping: gong^{2} duk^{6}
Transcriptions
Standard Mandarin
- Hanyu Pinyin: Gǎng dú
- Wade–Giles: Kang^{3} tu^{2}
Yue: Cantonese
- Yale Romanization: góng duhk
- Jyutping: gong^{2} duk^{6}

The Hong Kong independence movement is a political movement advocating the independence of Hong Kong as a sovereign state separate from China. Hong Kong is a special administrative region (SAR) of China and is thus granted a high degree of de jure autonomy, as stipulated by Article 2 of the Hong Kong Basic Law ratified under the Sino-British Joint Declaration. Since the handover of Hong Kong from the United Kingdom to China in 1997, a growing number of Hongkongers have become concerned about what they see as Beijing's encroachment on the territory's freedoms and the failure of the Hong Kong government to deliver "genuine democracy". Since the early 2010s there has been a major rise of awareness in Hongkonger self-identity, which was largely seen as a reaction to the gradual encroachment of the One country, two systems status-quo by the Chinese Communist Party especially after Xi Jinping's accession to General Secretary of the Chinese Communist Party, the top position in November 2012, marked a more hardline authoritarian approach. The spectre that Hong Kong may similarly be brought to heel became an important element in the independence movements. Advocating for Hong Kong independence became illegal after the Hong Kong national security law was enacted in 2020.

The current independence movement gained significant support after the 2014–15 Hong Kong electoral reform which deeply divided the territory, as it would have allowed Hongkongers to have universal suffrage conditional upon Beijing having the authority to screen prospective candidates for the Chief Executive of Hong Kong (CE), the head of the government of the territory. It sparked the 79-day massive occupation protests dubbed as the "Umbrella Revolution". After the protests, many new political groups advocating independence or self-determination were established, as they deemed the "One Country, Two Systems" principle to have failed.

According to a number of opinion polls conducted by the Chinese University of Hong Kong (CUHK), the Hong Kong Public Opinion Research Institute (HKPORI), and Reuters, a majority of Hongkongers do not support Hong Kong independence. However, support for independence is higher amongst young Hongkongers. In a CUHK survey of 1,010 Cantonese speaking Hong Kong residents in July 2016, nearly 40 per cent of respondents aged 15 to 24 supported the territory becoming an independent country, whereas 17.4 per cent of the respondents overall supported independence, despite only 3.6 per cent stating that they thought it was "possible". A majority of respondents, 69.6 per cent, supported maintaining "One Country, Two Systems", while slightly over 13 per cent of respondents supported direct governance by China.

== History ==
=== Colonial period ===
The colonial flag of Hong Kong (1959–1997) is often flown by supporters of Hong Kong independence.

Hong Kong Island was first occupied by the British in 1841. The island was officially ceded as a crown colony to the United Kingdom from the Qing dynasty in 1842 after the First Opium War under the terms in the Treaty of Nanking. The other parts of Hong Kong, Kowloon and the New Territories were ceded permanently and leased for 99 years to the British in 1860 under the Convention of Peking and in 1898 under the Second Convention of Peking respectively. Although the Chinese government under the Kuomintang led by Chiang Kai-shek initially intended to take back the territory, the British resumed control of Hong Kong in 1945 after the Second World War, in which Hong Kong was occupied by Japan for three years and eight months. There were few advocates for the decolonisation of Hong Kong from British rule during the post-war period, notably Ma Man-fai and the Democratic Self-Government Party of Hong Kong in the 1960s, but the fruitless movement ceased to exist without substantial support from the public.

In the late 1970s and early 1980s, the question of Hong Kong sovereignty emerged on Hong Kong's political scene as the end of the New Territories lease was approaching. The British and Chinese governments had also begun negotiations in 1982 which would lead to the Sino-British Joint Declaration of 1984. Hong Kong and Macau were both removed from the United Nations list of non-self-governing territories, in which territories on the list would have the right to become independent, on 2 November 1972, by the request of China. Although there were advocates of Hong Kong independence, the majority of the Hong Kong population, many of whom were political, economic or war refugees from the Chinese Civil War and the communist regime in mainland China, wished to maintain the status quo.

Of 998 Hongkongers polled by Survey Research Hong Kong Ltd. in March 1982, 95 per cent said that the status quo (i.e. British rule) was "acceptable", 64 per cent said the same about Hong Kong remaining under British administration but under Chinese sovereignty, 42 per cent about Hong Kong becoming a special economic zone of China, 37 per cent about independence, and 26 per cent about a handover to China without special provisions. When asked for their preferred outcome after the 1997 deadline stipulated by the Sino-British Joint Declaration, 85 per cent of respondents supported the continuation of British rule – 70 per cent supported the status quo, while 15 per cent supported the transformation of Hong Kong into a British trust territory. Only 4 per cent of respondents supported full Chinese sovereignty over Hong Kong, while 2 per cent answered "None of the above" (including those who supported independence).

The request for a Hong Kong representative in the Sino-British negotiation was rejected by Beijing. In 1984, the British and Chinese governments signed the Sino-British Joint Declaration which stated that the sovereignty of Hong Kong should be transferred to China on 1 July 1997, and Hong Kong should enjoy a "high degree of autonomy" under the "One Country, Two Systems" principle.

From 1983 to 1997, Hong Kong saw an exodus of emigrants to overseas countries, especially in the wake of the 1989 Tiananmen Square protests and massacre, when more than a million Hongkongers showed up on the streets to support student protesters in Beijing. The Tiananmen massacre of 1989 strengthened anti-Beijing sentiments and also led to the emergence of the local democracy movement, which demanded a faster pace of democratisation before and after 1997.

=== Early SAR era ===
Since 1997, the implementation of the Hong Kong Basic Law Article 45 and Article 68, which states that the Chief Executive (CE) and the Legislative Council (LegCo) should be chosen by universal suffrage, has dominated the political agenda in Hong Kong. The pro-democracy camp, one of the two largest political alignments in the territory, has called for the early implementation of the universal suffrage since the 1980s. After more than 500,000 people protested against the legislation of national security law as stipulated in the Basic Law Article 23 on 1 July 2003, the Standing Committee of the National People's Congress (NPCSC) in April 2004 ruled out universal suffrage before 2012.

Since 2003, Beijing's growing encroachment has led Hong Kong to become increasingly integrated as part of China. Hong Kong's freedoms and core values were perceived to have been eroded as a result. In 2009 and 2010, the construction of the Hong Kong section of the high-speed rail link to Guangzhou (XRL) escalated to a series of massive protests. Many protesters accused of the Hong Kong government spending HK$69.9 billion (US$9 billion) for an unnecessary railway just to please Beijing. Some also feared it was for the benefit of the People's Liberation Army in order to mobilise its troops quicker. In 2012, the government's plan to carry out moral and national education sparked controversy as it was accused of praising the Chinese Communist Party and Chinese nationalist ideology while condemning democracy and "western values". The anti-moral and national education led by student group Scholarism headed by Joshua Wong successfully attracted high turnout of people attending assemblies which led to the government backing down.

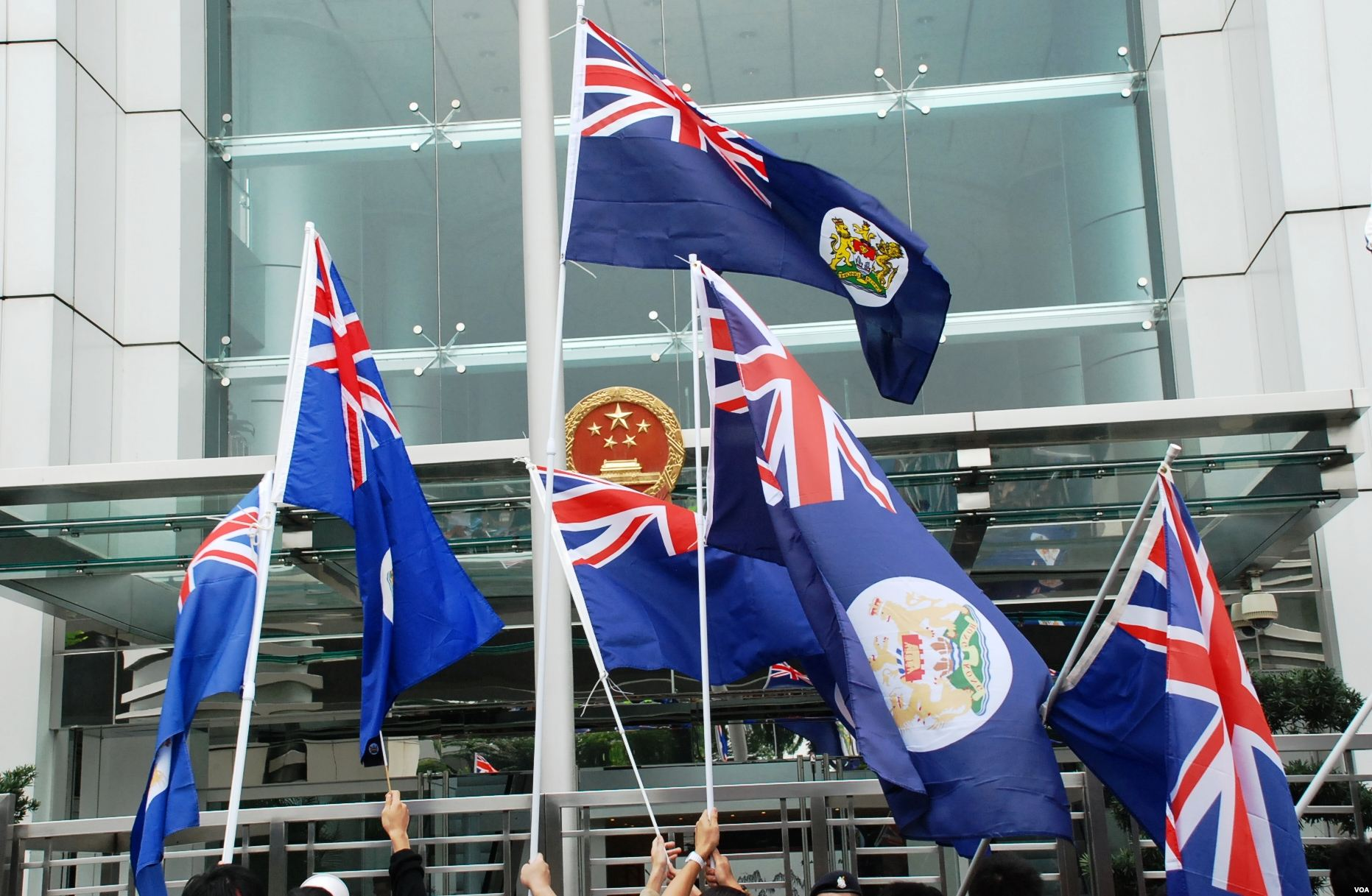
Protesters waving the Hong Kong colonial flags in front of the Chinese Liaison Office in Hong Kong.

In 2011, there was an emergence of localist sentiments, of which some took the anti-immigration nativist stance, fearing mainland Chinese new immigrants, tourists and parallel traders would threaten the established institutions and social customs of Hong Kong. Chin Wan's On the Hong Kong City-State, published in 2011, arguing for a "localist" perspective and to abandon the "Chinese nationalist sentiment", triggered fierce public debate and was popular among the young generation. Chin Wan theory had a strong influence on the younger activists, who held a strong resentment against the mild Chinese nationalistic pan-democrats and its organisation of the annual memorials for the 1989 Tiananmen Square protests and massacre which had a "Chinese nationalistic theme" as they perceived. Many of them also promoted nostalgic sentiments for British rule and waved colonial flags at public assemblies.

=== Emergence of the pro-independence movement ===
The Undergrad, the official publication of the Hong Kong University Students' Union (HKUSU), from February 2014, published a few articles on the subject of a Hong Kong nation including "The Hong Kong nation deciding its own fate" and "Democracy and Independence for Hong Kong". Chief Executive Leung Chun-ying used his 2015 New Year's policy address to direct harsh criticism at the magazine for promoting Hong Kong independence, which in fact had little traction up to that point, fanning both the debate and sales of the book Hong Kong Nationalism which featured the articles.

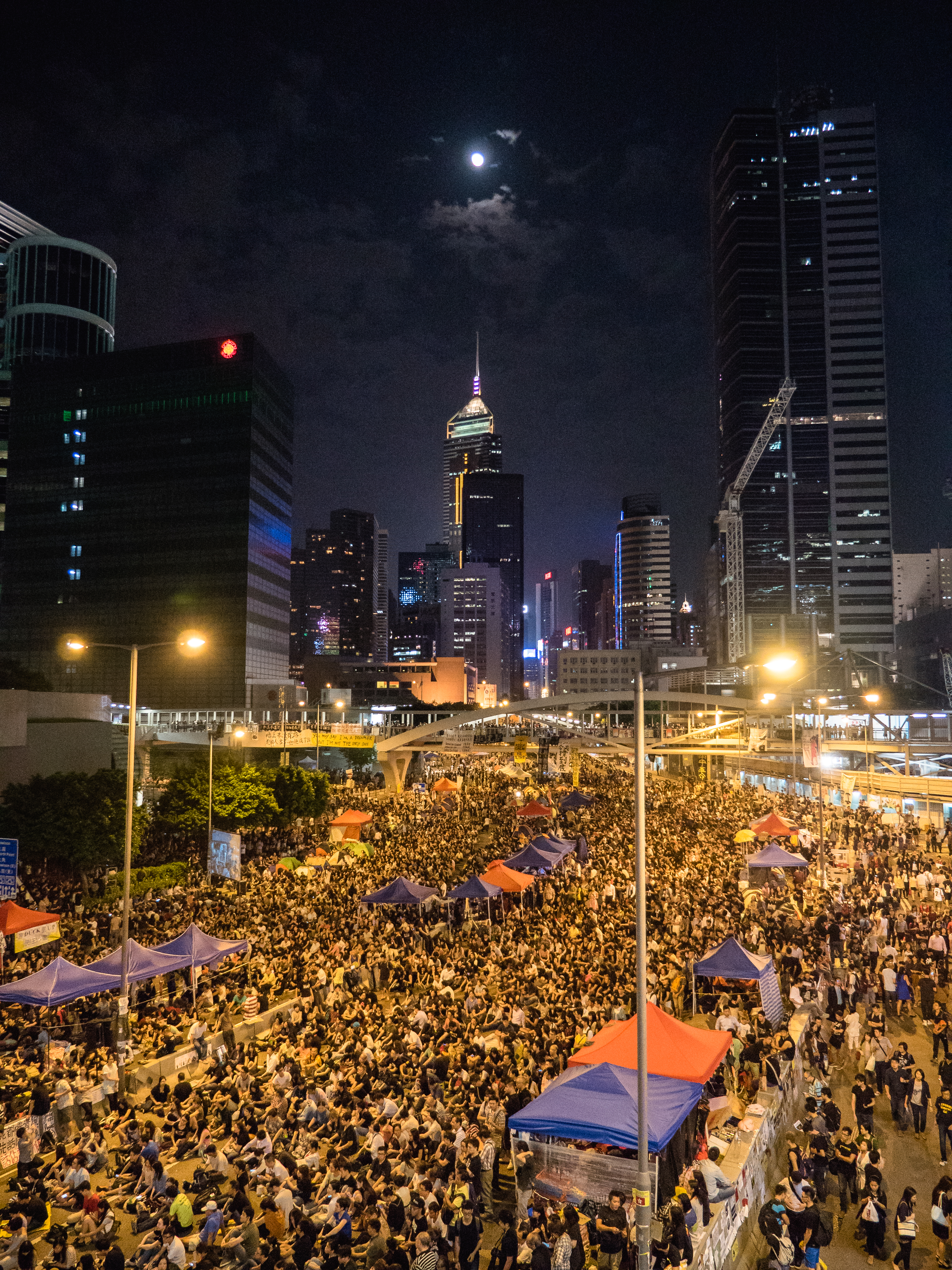
A new wave of pro-independence movement emerged after the 2014 NPCSC Decision and Umbrella Revolution.

On 31 August 2014, the Standing Committee of the National People's Congress (NPCSC) set restriction on the electoral method of the Chief Executive, in which any candidate should be screened through by a Beijing-controlled nominating committee before standing in the election. The 2014 NPCSC decision triggered a historic 79-day protest which was dubbed as the "Umbrella Revolution". The failure of the campaign for a free and genuine democratic process strengthened the pro-independence discourse, as it was viewed as a failure of the "One Country, Two Systems" and an independent state would be the only way out. Localist political groups led by youngsters mushroomed after the protests. As some of them such as Youngspiration took the parliamentary path by participating in the 2015 District Council elections, other such as Hong Kong Indigenous took the "street action" by targeting the mainland tourists and parallel traders with a militant style of protesting.

On 8 February during the 2016 Chinese New Year holidays, the Mong Kok civil unrest broke out between police and protesters following the government's crackdown on unlicensed street hawkers. Batons and pepper spray were used by the police and two warning shots were fired into the air, while protesters threw glass bottles, bricks, flower pots and trash bins toward the police and set fires in the streets. The main participant in the event, Hong Kong Indigenous, a political group with pro-independence tendencies, was branded by Director of the Chinese Liaison Office in Hong Kong Zhang Xiaoming as "radical separatists" who were "inclined toward terrorism." The People's Liberation Army also released a statement holding "individual local radical separatist organisation(s)" responsible for the riot as well as criticising western media for "beautifying the unrest" in its early reports. Edward Leung, leader of the Hong Kong Indigenous who was heavily involved in the civil unrest, scored a better-than-expected result in the New Territories East by-election later in the month by taking 15 per cent of the vote. After the result, Leung claimed localism had gained a foothold as the third most important power in local politics, standing side by side with the pan-democracy and pro-Beijing camps.

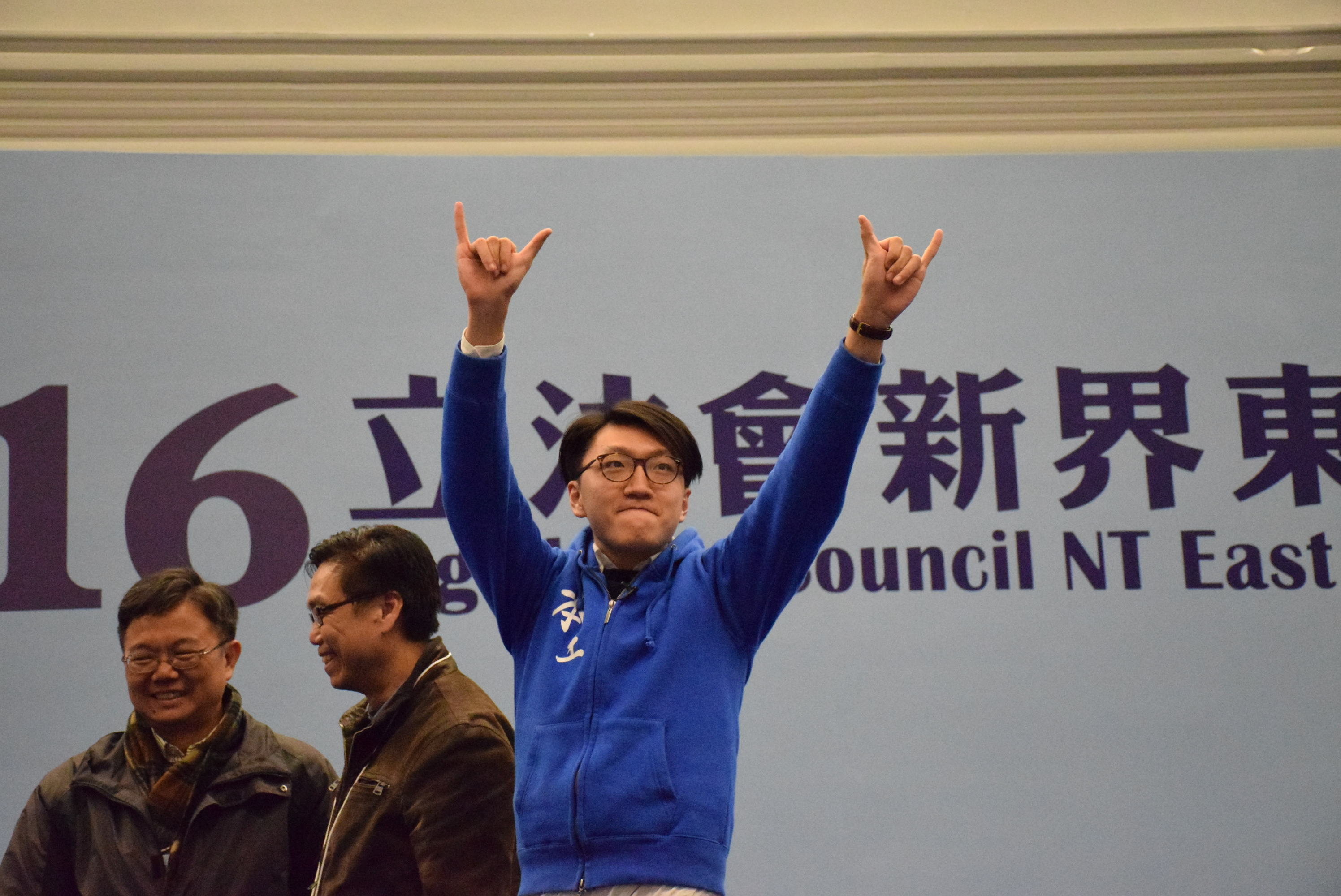
Edward Leung of the pro-independence Hong Kong Indigenous received more than 66,000 votes in the 2016 New Territories East by-election.

Hong Kong National Party, the first party openly advocating for Hong Kong independence and a Republic of Hong Kong was established on 28 March 2016, drawing attacks from the Beijing and SAR governments. The State Council's Hong Kong and Macau Affairs Office issued a statement condemning the party, saying it "has harmed the country's sovereignty, security, endangered the prosperity and stability of Hong Kong, and the core interests of Hong Kong ..." The Hong Kong government issued a statement after the formation of the party, stating that "any suggestion that Hong Kong should be independent or any movement to advocate such 'independence' is against the Basic Law, and will undermine the stability and prosperity of Hong Kong and impair the interest of the general public ... The SAR Government will take action according to the law."

Demosistō, a political party mainly led by the former student leaders such as Joshua Wong and Nathan Law in the 2014 Occupy protests established on 10 April 2016, advocated a referendum to determine Hong Kong's sovereignty after 2047, when the "One Country, Two Systems" principle as promised in the Sino-British Joint Declaration and the Hong Kong Basic Law is supposed to expire. Demosistō formed electoral alliance with other like-minded, and stresses the notion "democratic self-determination" as opposed to the right-wing pro-independence groups' "national self-determination". Due to its advocacy for "referendum", the Company Registry and police delayed their registration as a company or society. The party was also unable to set up its own bank account to raise funds.

The Undergrad again published an article in March 2016 headed "Hong Kong Youth's Declaration" argues for Hong Kong independence on expiry of the Sino-British Joint Declaration in 2047. It demands a democratic government be set up after 2047 and for the public to draw up the Hong Kong constitution. It also denounces the Hong Kong government for becoming a "puppet" of the Communist regime, "weakening" the territory's autonomy. Leung Chun-ying dismissed the claim, insisting that "Hong Kong has been a part of China since ancient times, and this is a fact that will not change after 2047."

=== Initial suppression ===
==== 2016 Legislative Council disqualification controversies ====
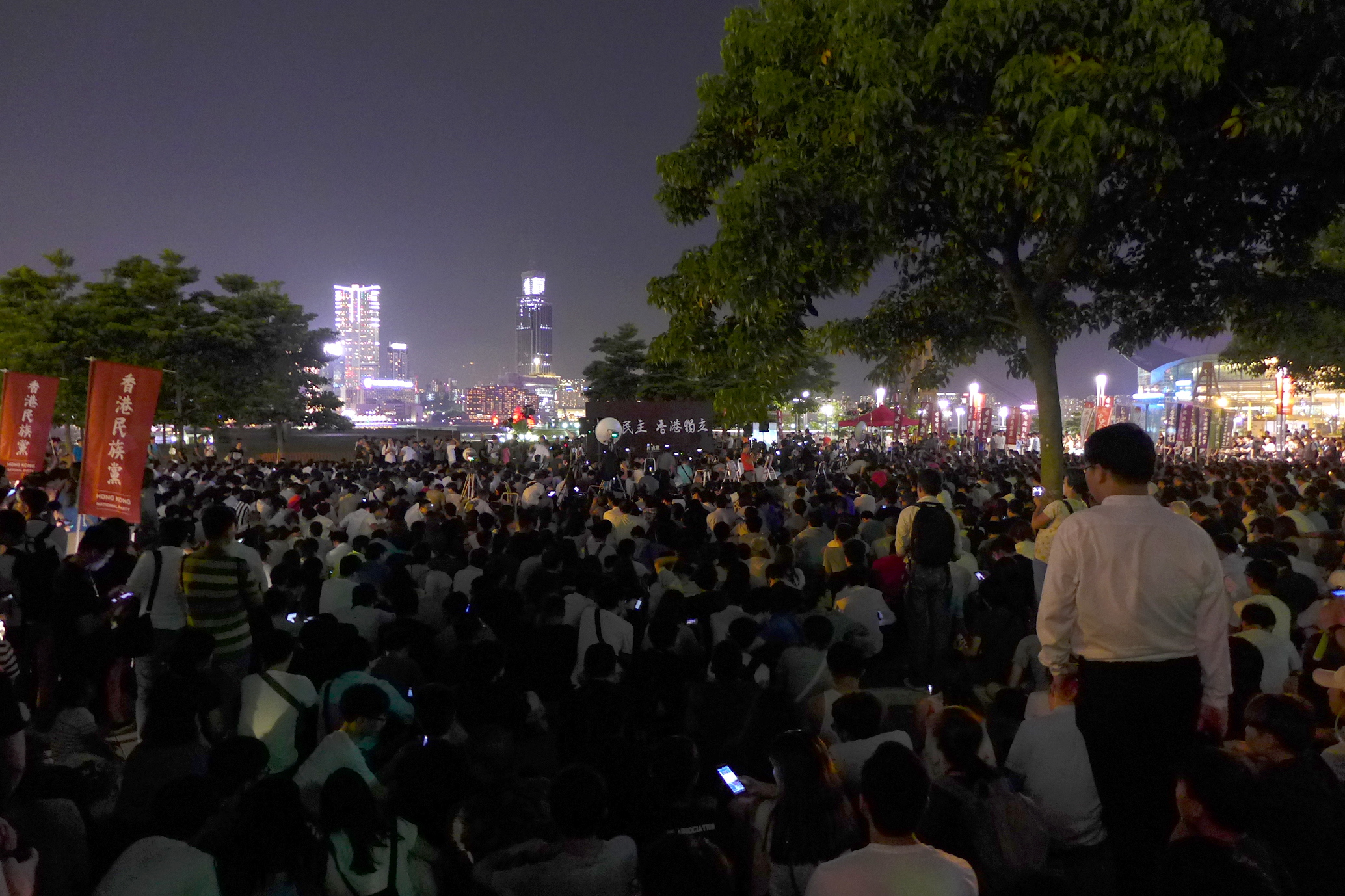
2,500 people attended a rally in the wake of the LegCo candidates' disqualification controversy on 5 August 2016.

In the 2016 Legislative Council election, six pro-independence activists were disqualified, including Hong Kong Indigenous' Edward Leung and Hong Kong National Party's Chan Ho-tin, by the Electoral Affairs Commission (EAC), in which the government argued that their pro-independence stances did not comply with the Basic Law Article 1 which stated that Hong Kong being an inalienable part of China and Legislative Council Ordinance (Cap. 542) § 40(1)(b) which required all candidates to uphold the Basic Law and pledge allegiance to the Hong Kong Special Administrative Region. On 5 August, the Hong Kong pro-independence activists launched a rally which was dubbed "first pro-independence rally in Hong Kong" and drew about 2,500 people. The localists who successfully entered the race, together took away 19 per cent of the total vote share in the general elections under different banners and slogans advocating "self-determination".

On 12 October 2016, the inaugural meeting of the Legislative Council, two Youngspiration legislators Baggio Leung and Yau Wai-ching took the oaths of office as an opportunity to make pro-independence statements. The two claimed that "As a member of the Legislative Council, I shall pay earnest efforts in keeping guard over the interests of the Hong Kong nation," displayed a "Hong Kong is not China" banner, inserted their own words into the oaths and mispronounced "People's Republic of China" as "people's re-fucking of Chee-na". （Hong Kong Government Cantonese Romanisation uses the same "ch" letter combination to represent both aspirated chʼ and unaspirated ch, and omits the diacritics. English readers may find this spelling confusing and mispronounce the sounds. Yale romanisation of Cantonese, on the other hand, uses different letters to represent these two sounds. The Yale Romanization for these two characters is "ji1 na5". To enable English readers to produce a pronunciation closest to the Cantonese, spelling it as "Jee-na" would be more appropriate.）Their oaths were invalidated by the LegCo secretary-general Kenneth Chen and were subsequently challenged by the government in the court. On 7 November 2016, the National People's Congress Standing Committee (NPCSC) interpreted the Article 104 of the Basic Law of Hong Kong to "clarify" the provision of the legislators to swear allegiance to Hong Kong as part of China when they take office. The spokesman of the Hong Kong and Macau Affairs Office stated that "[Beijing] will absolutely neither permit anyone advocating secession in Hong Kong nor allow any pro-independence activists to enter a government institution." Consequently, the court disqualified that the two legislators on 15 November.

After the disqualification of the two legislators, the government launched the second wave of legal challenge against four more pro-democracy legislators who used the oath-taking ceremony, including Demosistō's Nathan Law as well as Lau Siu-lai, who ran their campaigns with the "self-determination" slogan. On 14 July 2017, the four legislators were unseated by the court.

==== 2017 universities' pro-independence banner row ====
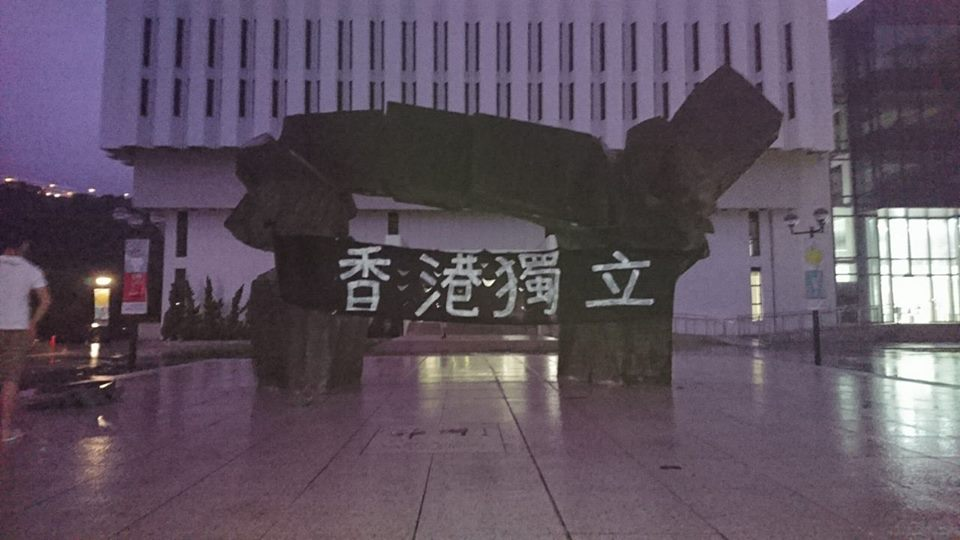
Hong Kong independence banner appeared at the Gate of Wisdom of the Chinese University of Hong Kong campus on 4 September 2017.

On 4 September 2017, the Hong Kong independence issue made a high-profile reappearance as the banners calling for independence surfaced at the Chinese University of Hong Kong (CUHK) overnight ahead of the new academic year. The school staff quickly removed them. Independence banners and posters surfaced at more universities as seven student unions joined forces to condemn the removal of the banners and posters by campus authorities as a "serious erosion" of academic freedom.

Quarrels and confrontation between some local and mainland students broke out as a number of mainland Chinese students grouped themselves to tear down the posters advocating Hong Kong independence on the CUHK campus's "democracy wall". The action of the mainland students was praised by the Chinese Communist Youth League which shared the video on its official WeChat account. A commentary titled "A rule must be set to make Hong Kong independence criminal" published on the state-owned People's Daily overseas edition website said the discussion on Hong Kong independence should be made illegal, just like it is illegal to promote Nazism in Germany.

On 11 September, Chief Executive Carrie Lam denounced the pro-independence banners and posters, asserting the students' message ran counter to the "one country, two systems" principle and the Basic Law, "I condemn the continued appearance of such remarks on university campuses, which is in violation of our country's sovereignty, territorial integrity and development interests," she said. She also insisted academic freedom and university autonomy were no excuse for propagating fallacies. On 15 September, ten university heads in Hong Kong, City University of Hong Kong, Hong Kong Baptist University, Hong Kong Shue Yan University, Lingnan University, the Chinese University of Hong Kong, the Education University of Hong Kong, the Hong Kong Polytechnic University, the Hong Kong University of Science and Technology, the Open University of Hong Kong and the University of Hong Kong, condemned the "recent abuses" of the freedom of expression in a joint statement, adding that all the universities do not support Hong Kong independence as it contravenes the Basic Law.

==== 2018 candidates' disqualification controversy ====
In the March 2018 Legislative Council by-elections for the four seats left vacant by the disqualified legislators over the oath-taking controversy, three candidates were disqualified by the Electoral Affairs Commission (EAC) returning officers, including Demosistō's Agnes Chow on the basis of that she "cannot possibly comply with the requirements of the relevant electoral laws, since advocating or promoting 'self-determination' is contrary to the content of the declaration that the law requires a candidate to make to uphold the Basic Law and pledge allegiance to the [Hong Kong Special Administrative Region]." The European Union issued a statement warning that banning Chow from the by-election "risks diminishing Hong Kong's international reputation as a free and open society". Localists Ventus Lau Wing-hong and James Chan Kwok-keung were also barred from running due to their previous pro-independence stance.

In the November by-election, Lau Siu-lai, ousted pro-democracy legislator in the oath-taking controversy was barred from entering the race by Returning Officer Franco Kwok Wai-fun on the basis of Lau previous advocacy of Hong Kong's self-determination, which showed she had no intention of upholding the Basic Law and pledging allegiance to Hong Kong as a special administrative region of China. In the same month, Legislative Councillor Eddie Chu who ran for the Village Representative election in Yuen Long was asked by Returning Officer Enoch Yuen if he agreed to uphold the Basic Law, agreed to recognise China's sovereignty over Hong Kong, and whether he supported Hong Kong independence. Chu restated his position that he has never supported Hong Kong independence: :I advocate and support the democratisation of the Basic Law and the political system – including but not limited to amending Article 158 and 159 of the Basic Law – as a goal of Hong Kongers’ self-determination after the Central Government blocked universal suffrage." On 2 December, Chu was told that his candidacy was invalid, making him the tenth candidate barred from running in the election for his political belief and the first banned from running in the village-level election.

==== Victor Mallet ban controversy ====
In August, a controversy erupted in 2018 when the FCC hosted a lunchtime talk with Andy Chan, convenor of the Hong Kong National Party (HKNP) to take place on 14 August. Victor Mallet, vice-chairman of the press organisation, chaired the session. The governments of China and Hong Kong had called for the cancellation of the talk, because the issue of independence supposedly crossed one of the "bottom lines" on national sovereignty. After a visit to Bangkok, Mallet was denied a working visa by the Hong Kong government. Mallet was subjected to a four-hour interrogation by immigration officers on his return from Thailand on Sunday 7 October before he was finally allowed to enter Hong Kong.

In the absence of an official explanation, Mallet's visa rejection was widely seen to be retribution for his role in chairing the Andy Chan talk, which the FCC refused to call off. Secretary for Security John Lee insisted the ban on Mallet was unrelated to press freedom, but declined to explain the decision. The incident caused a furious debate over restrictions to freedoms that were promised in the Sino-British Joint Declaration which included a "high degree of autonomy", democratic reforms, and maintenance of the freedom of the press.

=== Anti-extradition protests and the Hong Kong National Security Law ===
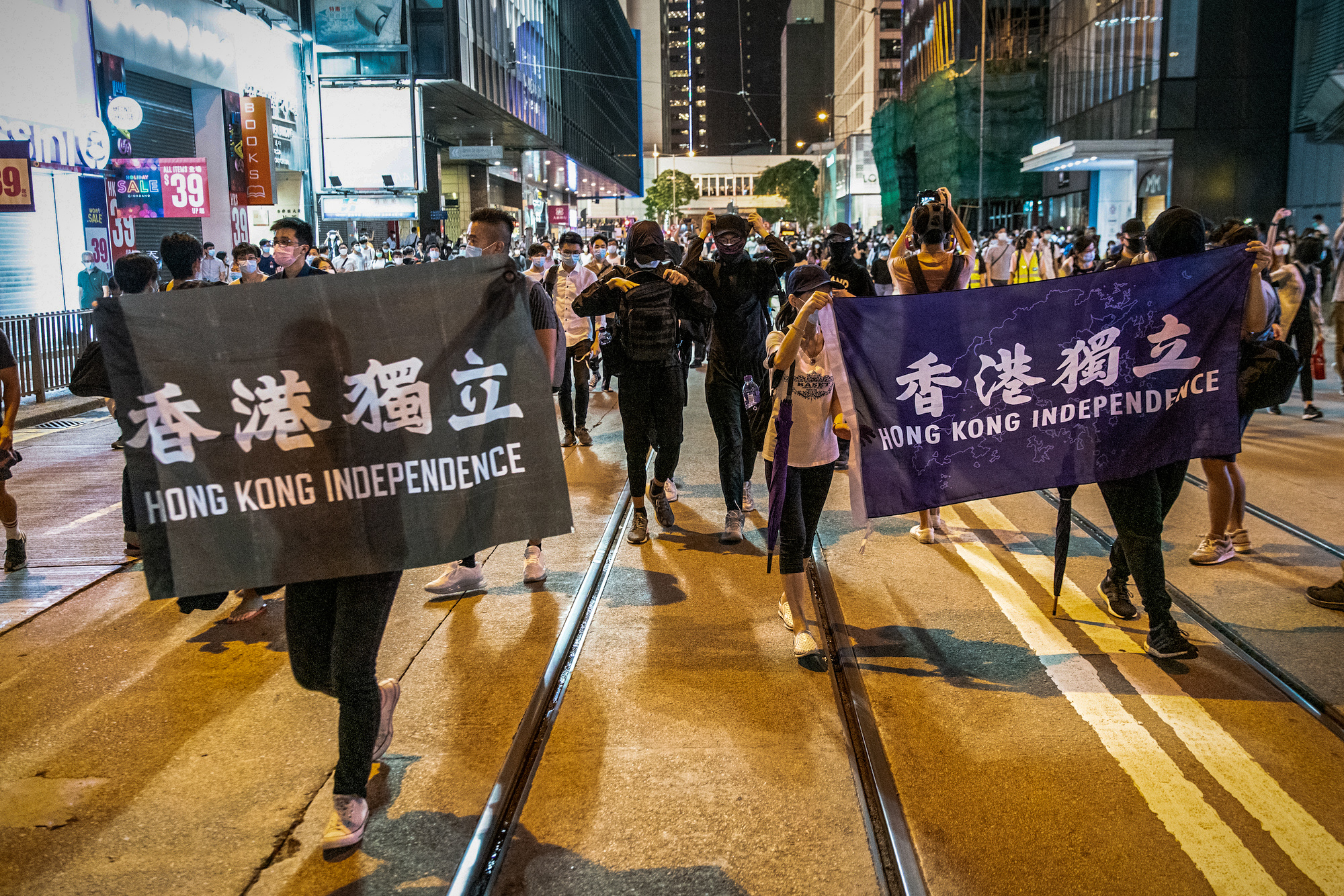
Demonstrators hold banners reading "Hong Kong independence" on 9 June 2020, the one-year anniversary of the first largest protest against the 2019 Hong Kong extradition bill.

In March, following months of protests, a poll by Reuters found that support for independence had risen to 20 per cent, while opposition had fallen sharply to 56 per cent, and those who were indifferent had doubled to 18 per cent.

In May 2020, after the decision on Hong Kong national security legislation was published, US congressman Scott Perry proposed a bill "to authorize the President to recognize the Hong Kong Special Administrative Region of the People's Republic of China as a separate, independent country, and for other purposes."

Advocacy of Hong Kong independence was outlawed with the enactment of the Hong Kong national security law on 1 July 2020, which banned "acts of secession". As of 20 November 2023, a total of 285 individuals have been arrested on suspicion of acts and activities endangering national security, some of whom were charged with acts of secession.

== Support for independence ==
Political parties that support Hong Kong's independence include Hong Kong Indigenous, Hong Kong National Party and Youngspiration. Youngspiration calls for the right to self-determination of the "Hong Kong nation" on their sovereignty. Localist activist group Civic Passion has expressed its support for Hong Kong independence before, but later called for the amendment of the Basic Law of Hong Kong through a civil referendum in the 2016 Legislative Council election. Before disbanding as a result of the 2020 Hong Kong national security law, Demosisto also called for the right to self-determination to determine Hong Kong's future after 2047 when the One Country, Two Systems principle as promised in the Sino-British Joint Declaration and the Hong Kong Basic Law is supposed to expire, although independence wasn't the party's position. Other parties, such as the Alliance of Resuming British Sovereignty over Hong Kong and Independence (BSHI) and the Hong Kong Independence Party, call for the return of British rule.

According to a survey conducted by the Hong Kong Public Opinion Research Institute in December 2019, one-fifth of Hong Kong's population supported Hong Kong independence, while 56 per cent of Hongkongers opposed it.

=== Reasons ===
Reasons that have been cited in favour of independence include:

- Right to self-determination: Hong Kong people have the right to determine their own future as stated in the International Covenant on Civil and Political Rights. Hong Kong was on the United Nations list of non-self-governing territories, which are given the right to achieve independence, before it was taken down on the request of the People's Republic of China in 1972.
- Lack of legitimacy of the Sino-British Joint Declaration and the Basic Law: Hong Kong people were barred from the negotiating process over the Sino-British Joint Declaration on Hong Kong's sovereignty in the 1980s and most Hong Kong people were also absent from drafting the Hong Kong Basic Law, the mini-constitution of the Hong Kong SAR.
- Unrepresentativeness of the Hong Kong government: the pro-democrats criticise that the Chief Executive of Hong Kong is elected by the 1,200-member Election Committee, which is dominated by Beijing and does not represent the general will of the Hong Kong people. About half of the seats in the Legislative Council of Hong Kong are elected through trade-based functional constituencies with limited electorates, which also heavily favour pro-Beijing politicians. The Hong Kong government is often criticised for listening only to Beijing and acting against Hong Kong's interests. Despite the historic Occupy protests in 2014 calling for genuine universal suffrage, the Hong Kong government refused to make any concession in the electoral reform.
- Beijing's encroachment on Hong Kong's autonomy: The Chinese government has been criticised for its growing encroachment on Hong Kong's political, economic, and social affairs, as well as for failing to deliver democratic guarantees promised in Article 45 and Article 68 of the Basic Law. Beijing has also been criticised for repeatedly violating the Sino-British Joint Declaration and the "One Country, Two Systems" principle as guaranteed by the Joint Declaration and the Basic Law, as shown by the Liaison Office openly meddling in local elections, arbitrary interpretations of the Basic Law, the publication of the "One Country, Two Systems" White Paper and the alleged abductions of the Causeway Bay booksellers, among other allegations.
- Hong Kong's distinct identity: Hong Kong people are majority Cantonese speakers and write in traditional Chinese and English with heavy influence of Western culture and values, including the respect for freedom, human rights, democracy and the rule of law, which is claimed to be very different from mainland China. They also perceive that the distinctive Hong Kong identity is under threat of the influx of the mainland immigrants and tourists as well as the "assimilation policies" of the Beijing government, including the Moral and National Education. The younger generations in Hong Kong increasingly do not identify as "Chinese", seeing themselves as either "Hongkongers" or mixed.

== Opposition to independence ==
=== Chinese and Hong Kong governments ===
The Chinese government firmly opposes Hong Kong independence. Former Chinese paramount leader Deng Xiaoping opposed British Prime Minister Margaret Thatcher's alternative proposals during the Sino-British negotiation in the early 1980s as he believed she "wanted to turn Hong Kong into some kind of an independent or semi-independent political entity".

After the establishment of the Hong Kong National Party in March 2016, an editorial piece in the Chinese government-owned Global Times slammed the Hong Kong National Party by stating that it is "impossible to achieve" independence for Hong Kong and calling it "a practical joke" and "forefront of extremism". The State Council's Hong Kong and Macau Affairs Office issued a statement through the official Xinhua News Agency condemning the party: "The action to establish a pro-independence organisation by an extremely small group of people in Hong Kong has harmed the country’s sovereignty, security, endangered the prosperity and stability of Hong Kong, and the core interests of Hong Kong ... It is firmly opposed by all Chinese people, including some seven million Hong Kong people. It is also a serious violation of the country's constitution, Hong Kong's Basic Law and the relevant existing laws." The spokesman of the Hong Kong and Macau Affairs Office stated that "[Beijing] will absolutely neither permit anyone advocating secession in Hong Kong nor allow any pro-independence activists to enter a government institution," after the National People's Congress Standing Committee (NPCSC) interpret the Article 104 of the Basic Law of Hong Kong which aimed to disqualify the two Youngspiration legislators Baggio Leung and Yau Wai-ching. On the universities' independence banner row, a commentary titled "A rule must be set to make Hong Kong independence criminal" published on the state-owned People's Daily overseas edition website said the discussion on Hong Kong independence should be made illegal, just like it is illegal to promote Nazism in Germany.

The Hong Kong government issued a statement after the formation of the Hong Kong National Party, stating that "any suggestion that Hong Kong should be independent or any movement to advocate such 'independence' is against the Basic Law, and will undermine the stability and prosperity of Hong Kong and impair the interest of the general public ... The SAR Government will take action according to the law."

Chinese nationalists deem the Hong Kong independence movement to be hanjian (traitors).

=== Political parties ===
The pro-Beijing camp holds the same stance with the Beijing and SAR government and strongly opposes Hong Kong independence. The mainstream pan-democracy camp sympathised with the pro-independence cause but generally opposes Hong Kong independence as they do not think it would be beneficial to Hong Kong, nor practical or achievable. They believe that to fight for genuine democracy and safeguard the high degree of autonomy under the "One Country, Two Systems" principle is the most foreseeable solution.

Although politicians and scholars like Chin Wan, Wong Yuk-man and Civic Passion's Wong Yeung-tat are seen as leading localist figures and have been close to the Hong Kong independence movement and even had advocated "nation building", they have also cut clear that they do not support Hong Kong independence during the midst of the Hong Kong LegCo candidates' disqualification controversy. They claim they fight for an amendment of the Basic Law through civil referendum to maintain Hong Kong's autonomy similar to that of Greenland's.

=== Others ===
The last British colonial governor Chris Patten opposes Hong Kong independence, worrying such activists would "dilute support" for democracy in Hong Kong: "[i]t would be dishonest, dishonourable and reckless of somebody like me, to pretend that the case for democracy should be mixed up with an argument about the independence of Hong Kong – something which is not going to happen, something which dilutes support for democracy, and something which has led to all sorts of antics which should not take place in a mature society aiming to be a full democracy."

In September 2017, ten university heads in Hong Kong, City University of Hong Kong, Hong Kong Baptist University, Hong Kong Shue Yan University, Lingnan University, the Chinese University of Hong Kong, the Education University of Hong Kong, the Hong Kong Polytechnic University, the Hong Kong University of Science and Technology, the Open University of Hong Kong and the University of Hong Kong stated that all the universities do not support Hong Kong independence as it contravenes the Basic Law.

=== Reasons ===
Reasons cited in favour of maintaining Hong Kong as part of China include:

- Legality: Article 1 of the Hong Kong Basic Law states that Hong Kong is an inalienable part of the People's Republic of China. Any advocacy for Hong Kong separating from China has no legal basis.
- Same cultural origin and close connection: Hong Kong has been part of China for most of its history. The majority of the people in Hong Kong are of Chinese origin which their parents or themselves migrated from the Mainland; even some of the pro-independence activists such as Edward Leung were born in mainland China. Most of Hong Kong culture originates from mainland China and is closely connected with Chinese history and culture.
- Benefits from China's growth: The economic growth and integration of Hong Kong and China have largely been mutually beneficial. China has become the crucial factor in Hong Kong's continuing economic growth and also the largest trading partner of Hong Kong. As the centre of the Renminbi overseas market, Hong Kong can continue to benefit from the growth of China and its potential superpower status.
- "One Country, Two Systems": Hong Kong, along with Macau, are the only territories in the People's Republic of China to supposedly enjoy a "high degree of autonomy" and freedom under the "One Country, Two Systems" principle as guaranteed by the Sino-British Joint Declaration and the Hong Kong Basic Law.
- Practicality: Hong Kong is surrounded by Chinese territories (both land and maritime) and lacks natural resources. It currently relies on China in terms of food (over 90 per cent imported, including nearly all meat, produce and rice), fresh water, electricity and fuel supplies, and it is claimed that Hong Kong will not be self-sufficient without mainland China. The Beijing government's zero tolerance on any secessionist movement also means that any move toward independence could mean war and bloodshed. The social stability and economic prosperity Hong Kong people have enjoyed for many years will have to be sacrificed. The probability of Hong Kong people achieving independence via violent means is very low, as Hong Kong separatists—while capable of organising street violence—have no combat-capable armed forces. In contrast, China commands the largest standing army in the world and the 10,000-strong People's Liberation Army Hong Kong Garrison is based directly in Hong Kong across numerous barracks.
- Counterproductive to the democratic cause: The call for independence would "dilute support" for democracy as the issue of independence would mix up with and draw attention from the case for democracy. Any attempt to reject Article 1 of the Hong Kong Basic Law will mean nullifying any previous promise from Beijing to maintain Hong Kong's autonomy and would lead to direct retaliation and possible territorial annexation by the Chinese government. Turning activism for democracy into a secessionist challenge to Chinese sovereignty would certainly be at the expense of the long-term autonomy and civil liberties of the Hong Kong people.

== Opinion polls ==
| Date(s) conducted | Polling source | Sample size | Should Hong Kong be an independent country? | |
| Date(s) conducted | Polling source | Sample size | Yes | No |
|---|---|---|---|---|
| August 2020 | HKPORI | 1,007 | 19.5% | 58.5% |
| 15–18 June 2020 | Reuters | 1,002 | 21% | 60% |
| 17–20 March 2020 | Reuters | 1,001 | 20% | 56% |
| 17–20 December 2019 | Reuters | 1,021 | 17% | 68% |
| 7 June 2017 | CUHK | 1,028 | 11.4% | 60.2% |
| 17 July 2016 | CUHK | 1,010 | 17.4% | 57.6% |

== See also ==
- Cantonese nationalism
- Localism in Hong Kong
- Hong Kong–Mainland China conflict
- Macau independence
- Taiwan independence movement
- Tibetan independence movement
- East Turkestan independence movement
- Inner Mongolian independence movement
- Singapore
