= Hong Kong Independence Party =

Hong Kong Independence Party 香港獨立黨
- Abbreviation: HKIP
- Secretary-General: Daniel Ma
- Founded: 27 February 2015
- Dissolved: 2022
- Headquarters: 4th Floor, 86-90 Paul Street, London EC2A 4NE, United Kingdom; 49 Station Road, Polegate BN26 6EA, United Kingdom
- Ideology: Hong Kong independence
- Slogan: "Independence for Hong Kong, rejoin the Commonwealth of Nations"

Website
- www.hkip.org.uk

Hong Kong Independence Party
- Traditional Chinese: 香港獨立黨
- Simplified Chinese: 香港独立党
Transcriptions
Yue: Cantonese
- Yale Romanization: Hēunggóng Duhklaahp Dóng
- Jyutping: Hoeng^{1}gong^{2} Duk^{6}laap^{6} Dong^{2}

The Hong Kong Independence Party (Note: Chinese: 香港獨立黨; Jyutping: Hoeng1gong2 Duk6laap6 Dong2) (HKIP) was a non-profit organisation which advocates Hong Kong independence or the return of Hong Kong's sovereignty to the United Kingdom. It was registered in the United Kingdom as a political party from 27 February 2015 to 11 February 2018, and is based in London. The party's slogan was "Independence for Hong Kong, rejoin the Commonwealth of Nations" (香港獨立，重回英聯邦).

== History ==
HKIP was launched in the United Kingdom in 2015. Chinese backed media claimed it was being used as a vehicle to provide funding for Hong Kong independence movements within the territory. The party often attended pro-Hong Kong democracy protests waving the flag of British Hong Kong. The Director of the People's Republic of China's Hong Kong Liaison Office, Zhang Xiaoming, responded by stating that Hong Kongers should look at the spirit of the Hong Kong Basic Law in response to growing support for HKIP. It was statutorily deregistered as a political party in 2018. In 2022, it had disbanded following the passage of the Hong Kong National Security Law.

In April 2024, Joseph John, HKIP president and social media accounts manager, was sentenced to five years in jail for conspiring to incite others to commit secession, a crime under the Hong Kong national security law. He had been arrested in November 2022 upon arriving in Hong Kong from the United Kingdom for a family visit. As a holder of a Portuguese passport and a Hong Kong identity card, he was the first dual national convicted and jailed under the security law.

== See also ==
- Hong Kong National Party
