= New immigrants in Hong Kong =

Migrants from mainland China

New immigrants in Hong Kong (Chinese: 香港新移民) generally refers to migrants from mainland China (Mainlanders). Despite its literal meaning, the term is rarely used to describe newly arrived immigrants from regions other than mainland China. Since the transfer of sovereignty over Hong Kong to China, increasing numbers of migrants from mainland China have been coming to the territory.

== Family reunification and right of abode ==
Immediately after the handover of Hong Kong back to Chinese rule, Hong Kong's Legislative Council passed an amendment to the Basic Law that would restrict immigration to children born outside of Hong Kong that were born to Hong Kong residents. The constitutionality of this amendment came to be challenged in court, and in January 1999, the Hong Kong Court of Final Appeal ruled against the amendment. This ruling immediately granted up to 300,000 people in mainland China the right of abode in Hong Kong, and it was estimated that within the next ten years, about 1.6 million people in mainland China would become eligible for right of abode in Hong Kong.

=== Immigration and cross-border families ===
Hei Hang Hayes Tang (2003) gave the following account: after the first influx of refugee capitalists and workers from mainland China in the late 1940s, Hong Kong experienced another influx in the late 1970s. The migrants of this second wave were mainly young male mainlanders who made their living by working in the manufacturing industry. Being less attractive in the eyes of Hong Kong local born women, many of these young mainlanders generally had to find spouses in mainland China. Soon after the mainland government opened its door for economic development and after the signing of Sino-British Joint Declaration in 1984, there was a massive relocation of industrial activities from Hong Kong to the Pearl River Delta. Such industrial relocation has accentuated the trend of marriage between Hong Kong working-class men and mainland women (So, 2002). According to the General Household Survey 1991, some 95,200 Hong Kong residents who were married in mainland China had spouses still in Mainland. It was estimated that 149,500 had children living in China and the total number of children was around 310,000 (Fung, 1996).

=== Family reunification process and family strategies ===
For working-class newly arrived families, the family reunification process is typically long and difficult with a number of obstacles to overcome. There are complicated procedures and a long waiting time for getting a one-way permit. Therefore, cross-border family members need to formulate their own strategies for immigration and reunification. The families have to plan the ‘best’ time for reunification, decide who will take care of the children, and discuss where and in what school the children should receive their education (Ku, 2001). Rational and strategic use of family resources, including maximisation of family social capital is essential. Middle-class families tend to have an advantage in this process because of the financial capital and cultural capital they accumulated, but it is not the case for working-class newly arrived families.

The various scenarios in the family reunification process affect the social relations in the family, and therefore impact on the utilisation of family resources as well as its capital accumulation. The scenarios could be: 1. The mother migrates first, and the children receive education and are taken care of by their grandparents, relatives or school in the Mainland; 2. The child migrates first, and leaves behind his/her mother and possibly also siblings to join the father in Hong Kong.

In the latter case, the father needs to take up the role of nurturing which was previously played by the mother. Such a social phenomenon may create tension in family functioning (So, 2002:20). Rao and Yuen (2001) suggest that psychiatric problems in newly arrived students may rise owing to the disruptions in family relations and changes in family ecologies. It is also claimed that home-school co-operation can hardly be established if the mother, who has arrived in Hong Kong, does not know Cantonese.

=== Influx of mainland women coming to Hong Kong to give birth ===
In the 2001 case Director of Immigration v. Chong Fung Yuen, the Hong Kong Court of Final Appeal held that a boy born in Hong Kong to two mainland parents neither of whom was a Hong Kong resident nevertheless was entitled to the right of abode.

The number of children born to non-Hong Kong permanent residents in Hong Kong hospitals has increased almost 100 times from 2001 to the first 10 months of 2006. The number of babies born to mainland mothers soared to 20,000 in the first 10 months of 2006 from less than 9,000 in 2002. Thousands of women from the mainland come to Hong Kong to give birth because it entitles their babies to permanent residency there. The benefits include a free education and subsidised health care as part of Hong Kong's British-inspired welfare policies. Hong Kong residents pay as little as $12.80 to give birth at a hospital because of extensive government subsidies.

To limit mainland mothers coming to give birth, starting 1 February 2007, pregnant women from the mainland have to pay $5,000 for their hospital care before they are even allowed to enter Hong Kong. Under the new release rules, immigration officers will be instructed to turn back any mainlander who appears to be at least seven months pregnant and has not paid.

== Opposition ==
Politician Gary Fan has taken an anti-immigration stance, Fan has been frequently calling for the government to take back the approval rights on One-way Permits from Chinese authorities and to reduce the quota of such permits. Fan also refers to immigrants from mainland China and the quota of 150 daily permits as "the root of the housing problem".

In January 2013, Gary Fan and Claudia Mo formed a group called "HK First". They co-sponsored a controversial ad which claimed that reducing immigration would help the people of Hong Kong to get to the bottom of the housing problem, while rejecting claims of bias or discrimination against mainlanders, despite condemnation from the Equal Opportunities Commission. Fan later introduced a motion on adhering to the need to "put Hong Kong people first" in formulating policies, but the motion was ultimately defeated.

Many political parties in Hong Kong were opposed to large Chinese immigration due to cultural reasons and a lack of resources, especially in primary schools, public housing and certain jobs. These parties included Neo Democrats, Hong Kong Indigenous and Youngspiration.

A survey in 2012 found that 50.6 per cent of Hong Kongers thought the number of mainland immigrants should decrease. Only 16% thought immigration should increase.

== See also ==
- Hong Kong drifter
- Mainland Chinese Hongkongers
- Mainlanders (Hong Kong)

== Bibliography ==
- Ku, A. 2001. “Hegemonic Construction, Negotiation, and Displacement: The Struggle over Right of Abode in Hong Kong.” International Journal of Cultural Studies, no.4(3): 259–278.
- Kuah, K.E. 1999. "The split-family phenomenon: a new immigrant family structure.” in G. Wang and J. Wong (eds). Hong Kong in China: The Challenges of Transition. Singapore: Time Academic Press. pp. 203–230.
- Kuah, K.E.; and Wong, S.L. 2001. “Dialect and Territory-Based Associations: Cultural and Identity Brokers in Hong Kong.” in P.T. Lee (eds). Hong Kong Reintegrating with China:P, Cultural and Social Dimensions. Hong Kong: Hong Kong University Press.
- Rao, N., Yuen, M.T. 2001. “Accommodations for Assimilation: Supporting Newly Arrived Children from the Chinese Mainland to Hong Kong” in Childhood Education, no. 77 (5): 313–318
- Siu, Y.M. 1996. “Population and Immigration.” in M.K. Nyaw and S.M. Li (eds.) The Other Hong Kong Report 1996. Hong Kong: The Chinese University Press. pp. 326–347.
- So, A.Y. 2002. Social Relations between Pearl River Delta and Hong Kong : A Study of Cross-border Families. Hong Kong: Centre for China Urban and Regional Studies, Hong Kong Baptist University.
- Tang, H.H. 2002. New Arrival Students in Hong Kong: Adaptation and School Performance. M.Phil thesis, Department of Sociology, The University of Hong Kong.
- Wong, C.Y. 2000. The Family Functioning of Newly Arrived Families in Hong Kong. Hong Kong: Hong Kong Family Welfare Society.
