= Mainland Chinese =

Ethnic classifications

Mainland Chinese or mainlanders are Chinese people who live in or have recently emigrated from mainland China, defined as the territory governed by the People's Republic of China (PRC) except for Hong Kong (SAR of the PRC), Macau (SAR of the PRC), and the partly-PRC-controlled South China Sea Islands (uninhabited and disputed), and also excluding certain territories that are claimed by the PRC but not controlled, namely Taiwan a.k.a. the "Republic of China" (ROC), which is a state with limited recognition, and other associated territories that are ruled by Taiwan (namely Fujian Province (ROC) and the Taiwan-ruled South China Sea Islands). The term also refers to historical groups of people of Chinese origin who immigrated to Hong Kong, Macau and Taiwan during the 20th century, especially in the context of specific historical events.

== Usage in Taiwan ==
Three terms are sometimes translated as "mainlander" in the Taiwanese context:

- Waishengren (Chinese: 外省人; pinyin: wàishěngrén) are people who immigrated to Taiwan from mainland China after the Japanese surrender in 1945, and into the mid-1950s in the aftermath of Kuomintang's defeat in the Chinese Civil War in 1949. This group can sometimes include their descendants born in Taiwan.
- New immigrants (Chinese: 新住民; pinyin: xīnzhùmín) include recent mainland Chinese immigrants to Taiwan. Distinct from waishengren, since the mid-1990s, there has been some limited mainland Chinese immigration into Taiwan. These immigrants are predominantly female and are often colloquially known as dàlù mèi (Chinese: 大陸妹), meaning "mainland girls". There are two dominant categories: brides of Taiwanese businessmen who work in mainland China; and women who have married Taiwanese men through a marriage broker.
- Daluren (Chinese: 大陸人; pinyin: dàlùrén) are citizens of the People's Republic of China (PRC) who live in mainland China. This group is increasingly referred to as simply "Chinese" (Chinese: 中國人; pinyin: zhōnggúorén), especially by the younger generation.

== Mainlanders in Hong Kong ==
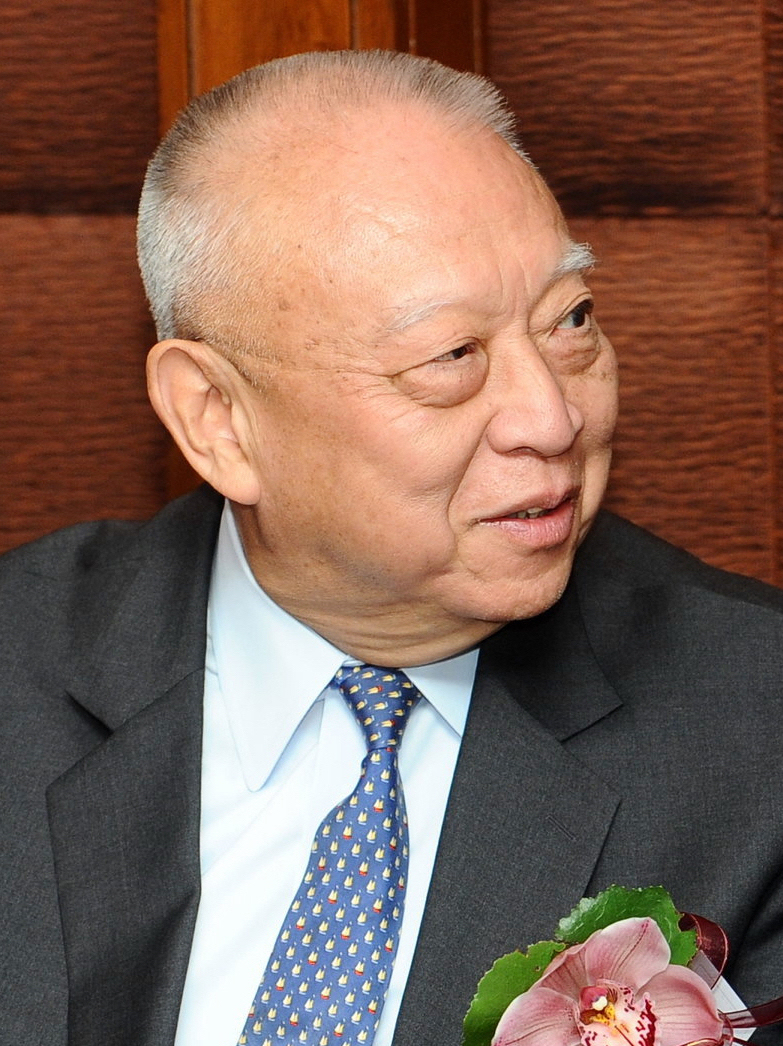
Tung Chee Hwa, former Chief Executive of Hong Kong.

In Hong Kong and Macau, "mainlander" or "inlander" (traditional Chinese: 內地人; simplified Chinese: 内地人; Jyutping: noi6 dei6 jan4; pinyin: Nèidì Rén) refers to residents of mainland China, or recent immigrants from mainland China.

=== Names ===
Residents of mainland China are usually referred to as 大陸人 (jyutping: daai6 luk6 jan4, literally "continental people"), 內地人 (jyutping: noi6 dei6 jan4, literally "inland people"). Officials in China, as well as pro-Beijing institutions in Hong Kong, refer to themselves as 內地同胞 (jyutping: noi6 dei6 tung4 baau1, literally "inland compatriot"). The second term is neutral, and the first term is commonly used by local Hong Kong Chinese but also used by government issued statements to refer to people from mainland China.

Mainlanders are sometimes called 表叔 (jyutping: biu2 suk1, literally "maternal uncle"), 表姐 (jyutping: biu2 ze2, literally "older female cousin"), and 阿燦 (jyutping: aa3 chaan3), which were coined by various characters in movies and television series. These politically incorrect terms are considered derogatory, and have led to a counter-insult 港燦 (jyutping: gong2 chaan3) from mainlanders. Recent immigrants are more appropriately called 新移民 (jyutping: san1 ji4 man4, literally "new immigrants").

=== History ===
At the time when Hong Kong was colonised by Great Britain, the colony first covered only Hong Kong Island, with a population of only around 6,000, most of whom were fishermen. Other than the indigenous population on Hong Kong Island, Kowloon and New Territories who had lived in the area before the British arrived, most people in Hong Kong either immigrated from somewhere in mainland China, or were descendants of those immigrants.

The largest influx of population from the mainland was during the Taiping Rebellion (late 19th century) and the Chinese Civil War (1945–1949). The British colonial government maintained a touch-base policy until the early 1980s, allowing people from mainland China to apply to be Hong Kong residents if they manage to arrive in the territory.

Some of these early immigrants, especially those who moved from Shanghai in the 1940s and early 1950s to escape the Communist government, some came to dominate the business world in Hong Kong. In the 1980s and 1990s, Shanghai-born immigrants also occupied some of the prominent roles in the government, including former Chief Executive Tung Chee-hwa and former Chief Secretary Anson Chan.

After decades of wars, internal conflicts and the Cultural Revolution, there was a large gap in the level of development between Hong Kong and the mainland. Many new immigrants arriving in the late 1970s and early 1980s were thought to be less sophisticated, and preserved many habits from the rural way of living. A very popular TVB series in 1979, 網中人, "the Good, the Bad, and the Ugly", starring Chow Yun Fat as a good-hearted and handsome Hong Kong university graduate, Carol "Dodo" Cheng as a rich and charismatic HK-and-UK-educated university graduate, and Liu Wai Hung (廖偉雄) as 阿燦 (jyutping: aa3 chaan3), Chow's long-lost good-hearted but unsophisticated rural-bred mainland brother arriving in Hong Kong as a new immigrant.

Starting from the early 1990s many new immigrants to Hong Kong are the spouses of residents and their children. Many of them are not rich, and some have to rely on money from Comprehensive Social Security Assistance to survive. Although only a few do so, new immigrants of this time were held in a negative view.

=== Education ===
Since the Handover in 1997, academic exchanges between Hong Kong and mainland China have become much more common. In 2004, a policy was passed that allowed mainland high school students to apply to Hong Kong universities. The Chinese government encouraged more Hong Kong students to study in mainland universities by offering scholarships.

=== Recent development ===
Since 1 July 1997, the day when Hong Kong became a Special Administrative Region of the People's Republic of China, the immigration policies have changed. It is stated that "[a] person of Chinese nationality born outside Hong Kong before or after the establishment of the HKSAR [Hong Kong Special Administrative Region] to a parent who, at the time of birth of that person, was a Chinese citizen who is a permanent resident, is a permanent resident of the HKSAR and enjoys the right of abode in Hong Kong".

But in 1999, the Court of Final Appeal of HKSAR made a judgment that as long as the person is born in Hong Kong, they will be regarded as a permanent resident and will get the right of abode, even though their parents are not permanent residents of Hong Kong at the time they are born.

Since then, a lot of mainlanders have come to live in Hong Kong. Every day there is a quota of 150 immigrants.

- A daily sub-quota of 60 is given to children of all ages who are eligible for the right of abode in Hong Kong.
- A sub-quota of 30 is for long-separated spouses.
- An unspecified sub-quota of 60 is for other OWP applicants allocated to the following persons:
  - separated spouses irrespective of the length of separation;
  - dependent children coming to Hong Kong to join their relatives;
  - persons coming to Hong Kong to take care of their dependent parents;
  - dependent elderly people coming to Hong Kong to join their relatives;
  - those entering Hong Kong for the inheritance of property.

In 2003, the mainland authorities loosened control on mainland residents over visiting Hong Kong and Macau. Before this change, residents from the mainland could only visit Hong Kong and Macau for sightseeing as part of tour groups. The Individual Visit Scheme allows mainland residents of selected cities to visit Hong Kong and Macau for sightseeing on their own. It has boosted tourism in the two special administrative regions.

==== Quality Migrant Admission Scheme ====
On 28 June 2006, the HKSAR imposed the Quality Migrant Admission Scheme. It is a scheme which aims at attracting highly skilled or talented persons who are fresh immigrants not having the right to enter and remain in Hong Kong to settle in Hong Kong in order to enhance Hong Kong's economic competitiveness in the global market. Successful applicants are not required to secure an offer of local employment before their entry to Hong Kong for settlement. Many mainland artists and former national sportsmen/sportswomen have applied for the right of abode via this way, such as Li Yundi and Lang Lang.

=== People ===
The following are some notable people who were born in the mainland and moved to Hong Kong.

- Anson Chan, politician, born in Shanghai.
- Ip Man, martial artist and Wing Chun kung fu teacher/instructor, known for teaching actor-martial artist Bruce Lee, born in Guangdong.
- Wong Jim (a.k.a. James Wong), musician, born in Guangdong.
- Lau Kar-leung, martial artist, actor and filmmaker, born in Guangdong.
- Lau Chin Shek, politician, born in Guangdong.
- Tang Hsiang Chien, businessman, born in Shanghai.
- Tung Chee Hwa, politician, born in Shanghai.
- Ti Lung, actor and martial artist, born in Guangdong.
- David Chiang, actor, martial artist and filmmaker, born in Shanghai.
- Gordon Liu, actor, martial artist and stuntman, born in Guangdong.
- Hsiao Ho, actor and martial artist, born in Guangdong.
- Wong Kar-wai, filmmaker, born in Shanghai.
- Donnie Yen, actor and martial artist, born in Guangdong.
- G.E.M., singer-songwriter and actress, born in Shanghai.
- Faye Wong, singer-songwriter and actress, born in Beijing.
- Leon Lai, singer-songwriter and actor, born in Beijing.
- Hins Cheung, singer-songwriter and actor, born in Guangzhou.
