= Opinion polling for the 2016 Hong Kong legislative election =

This article presents detailed opinion polling for the 2016 Hong Kong legislative election.

== Overall poll results ==
Overall poll results for each party in geographical constituencies according to each constituency.

=== Opinion polling ===
==== By parties ====
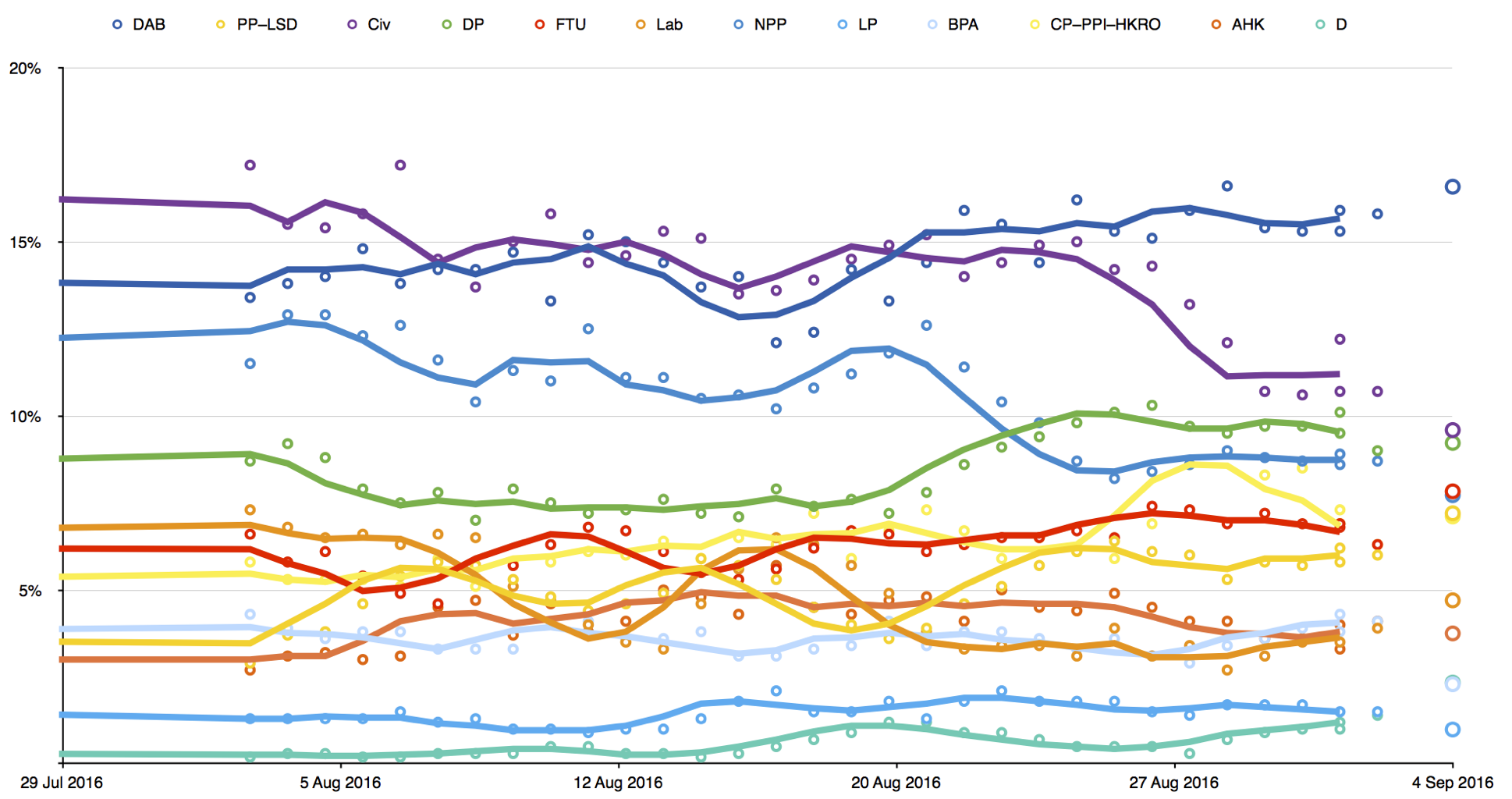
DAB PP–LSD Civic Democratic FTU Labour NPP Liberal BPA CP–PPI–HKRO ALLinHK Demosisto

Date(s) conducted	Polling source	Sample size	DAB	PP LSD	Civ	DP	FTU	Lab	NPP	LP	BPA	CP PPI HKRO	AHK	D	Others	Lead
4 Sep 2016	Election result		16.6%	7.2%	9.6%	9.2%	7.8%	4.7%	7.7%	1.0%	2.3%	7.1%	3.8%	2.3%	20.7%	7%
29 Aug–2 Sep 2016	HKUPOP	3,164	16%	6%	11%	9%	6%	4%	9%	2%	4%	6%	4%	1%	22%	5%
29 Aug–1 Sep 2016	HKRA	2,188	18%	4%	13%	10%	7%	4%	9%	2%	2%	6%	4%	1%	19%	5%
28 Aug–1 Sep 2016	HKUPOP	2,812	15%	6%	11%	10%	7%	3%	9%	2%	4%	7%	3%	1%	20%	4%
21 Aug–1 Sep 2016	PD/HKUPOP	5,311	16%	6%	12%	10%	7%	4%	9%	2%	4%	7%	4%	1%	19%	4%
27–31 Aug 2016	HKUPOP	2,515	15%	6%	11%	10%	7%	3%	9%	2%	4%	8%	4%	1%	21%	4%
26–30 Aug 2016	HKUPOP	2,181	15%	6%	11%	10%	7%	3%	9%	2%	4%	8%	4%	1%	21%	4%
20–29 Aug 2016	HKRA	5,016	16%	5%	15%	9%	6%	5%	10%	2%	2%	5%	5%	<1%	18%	1%
25–29 Aug 2016	HKUPOP	1,975	17%	5%	12%	10%	7%	3%	9%	2%	3%	9%	4%	1%	19%	5%
24–28 Aug 2016	HKUPOP	1,784	16%	6%	13%	10%	7%	3%	9%	1%	3%	9%	4%	<1%	19%	3%
23–27 Aug 2016	HKUPOP	1,782	15%	6%	14%	10%	7%	3%	8%	2%	3%	7%	5%	1%	19%	1%
22–26 Aug 2016	HKUPOP	1,783	15%	6%	14%	10%	7%	4%	8%	2%	4%	6%	5%	1%	18%	1%
21–25 Aug 2016	HKUPOP	1,789	16%	6%	15%	10%	7%	3%	9%	2%	3%	6%	4%	1%	18%	1%
20–24 Aug 2016	HKUPOP	1,634	14%	6%	15%	9%	6%	3%	10%	2%	4%	7%	4%	1%	19%	1%
19–23 Aug 2016	HKUPOP	1,482	15%	5%	14%	9%	7%	3%	10%	2%	4%	6%	5%	1%	18%	1%
18–22 Aug 2016	HKUPOP	1,331	16%	5%	14%	9%	6%	3%	11%	2%	4%	7%	4%	1%	19%	2%
17–21 Aug 2016	HKUPOP	1,178	14%	4%	15%	8%	6%	4%	13%	1%	3%	7%	5%	1%	18%	1%
16–20 Aug 2016	HKUPOP	1,042	13%	4%	15%	7%	7%	5%	12%	2%	4%	7%	5%	1%	19%	2%
30 Jul–19 Aug 2016	HKRA	5,023	17%	5%	16%	8%	6%	5%	10%	2%	2%	5%	5%	<1%	19%	1%
15–19 Aug 2016	HKUPOP	1,047	14%	4%	14%	8%	7%	6%	11%	2%	3%	6%	4%	1%	20%	Tied
14–18 Aug 2016	HKUPOP	1,045	12%	4%	14%	7%	6%	6%	11%	2%	3%	7%	5%	1%	21%	2%
13–17 Aug 2016	HKUPOP	1,048	12%	5%	14%	8%	6%	6%	10%	2%	3%	6%	6%	1%	21%	2%
12–16 Aug 2016	HKUPOP	1,046	14%	6%	13%	7%	5%	6%	11%	2%	3%	6%	4%	<1%	22%	1%
11–15 Aug 2016	HKUPOP	1,027	14%	6%	15%	7%	5%	5%	10%	1%	4%	6%	5%	<1%	22%	1%
10–14 Aug 2016	HKUPOP	1,025	14%	5%	15%	8%	6%	3%	11%	1%	4%	6%	5%	<1%	21%	1%
8–13 Aug 2016	HKUPOP	1,028	15%	5%	15%	7%	7%	3%	11%	1%	4%	6%	4%	<1%	22%	Tied
8–12 Aug 2016	HKUPOP	1,030	15%	4%	14%	7%	7%	4%	13%	1%	4%	6%	4%	1%	20%	1%
7–11 Aug 2016	HKUPOP	1,031	13%	5%	16%	8%	6%	5%	11%	1%	4%	6%	5%	1%	21%	3%
6–10 Aug 2016	HKUPOP	1,033	15%	5%	15%	8%	6%	5%	11%	1%	3%	6%	4%	<1%	21%	Tied
5–9 Aug 2016	HKUPOP	1,032	14%	6%	14%	7%	6%	6%	10%	1%	3%	5%	5%	<1%	22%	Tied
4–8 Aug 2016	HKUPOP	1,024	14%	6%	14%	8%	5%	7%	12%	1%	3%	6%	5%	<1%	19%	Tied
3–7 Aug 2016	HKUPOP	1,100	14%	5%	17%	7%	5%	6%	13%	2%	4%	5%	3%	<1%	19%	3%
2–6 Aug 2016	HKUPOP	1,187	15%	5%	16%	8%	6%	7%	12%	1%	4%	5%	3%	<1%	19%	1%
1–5 Aug 2016	HKUPOP	1,072	14%	4%	15%	9%	6%	6%	13%	1%	4%	5%	3%	<1%	19%	1%
31 Jul–4 Aug 2016	HKUPOP	1,158	14%	4%	16%	9%	6%	7%	13%	1%	4%	5%	3%	<1%	18%	2%
30 Jul–3 Aug 2016	HKUPOP	1,056	13%	3%	17%	9%	7%	7%	11%	1%	4%	6%	3%	1%	18%	4%
14–29 Jul 2016	HKRA	5,011	16%	4%	16%	8%	6%	6%	9%	3%	2%	5%	2%	1%	21%	Tied
20 Jun–7 Jul 2016	PD/HKUPOP	5,084	15%	5%	18%	7%	6%	5%	10%	3%	3%	4%	3%	1%	20%	3%
9 Sep 2012	Last election results	1,815,448	20.2%	14.6%	14.1%	13.7%	7.1%	6.2%	3.8%	2.7%	—N/a	—N/a	—N/a	—N/a	12.3%	5.6%

==== By camps ====
Date(s) conducted	Polling source	Sample size	Anti-establishment (Note: Anti-establishment included the pan-democracy camp and localist camp.)	Pro-establishment	Lead
4 Sep 2016	Election result		55.0%	40.2%	14.8%
29 Aug–2 Sep 2016	HKUPOP	3,164	53%	44%	9%
29 Aug–1 Sep 2016	HKRA	2,188	52%	43%	9%
28 Aug–1 Sep 2016	HKUPOP	2,812	52%	44%	8%
21 Aug–1 Sep 2016	PD/HKUPOP	5,311	54%	44%	10%
27–31 Aug 2016	HKUPOP	2,515	53%	44%	9%
26–30 Aug 2016	HKUPOP	2,181	53%	44%	9%
20–29 Aug 2016	HKRA	5,016	54%	42%	12%
25–29 Aug 2016	HKUPOP	1,975	53%	44%	9%
24–28 Aug 2016	HKUPOP	1,784	55%	42%	13%
23–27 Aug 2016	HKUPOP	1,782	55%	42%	13%
22–26 Aug 2016	HKUPOP	1,783	56%	42%	14%
21–25 Aug 2016	HKUPOP	1,789	54%	43%	11%
20–24 Aug 2016	HKUPOP	1,634	55%	42%	13%
19–23 Aug 2016	HKUPOP	1,482	53%	44%	9%
18–22 Aug 2016	HKUPOP	1,331	52%	44%	8%
17–21 Aug 2016	HKUPOP	1,178	55%	42%	13%
16–20 Aug 2016	HKUPOP	1,042	54%	42%	12%
30 Jul–19 Aug 2016	HKRA	5,023	53%	42%	11%
15–19 Aug 2016	HKUPOP	1,047	53%	43%	10%
14–18 Aug 2016	HKUPOP	1,045	55%	41%	14%
13–17 Aug 2016	HKUPOP	1,048	56%	40%	16%
12–16 Aug 2016	HKUPOP	1,046	53%	41%	12%
11–15 Aug 2016	HKUPOP	1,027	54%	41%	13%
10–14 Aug 2016	HKUPOP	1,025	53%	41%	12%
8–13 Aug 2016	HKUPOP	1,028	53%	42%	11%
8–12 Aug 2016	HKUPOP	1,030	51%	44%	7%
7–11 Aug 2016	HKUPOP	1,031	54%	41%	13%
6–10 Aug 2016	HKUPOP	1,033	53%	41%	12%
5–9 Aug 2016	HKUPOP	1,032	55%	40%	15%
4–8 Aug 2016	HKUPOP	1,024	56%	41%	15%
3–7 Aug 2016	HKUPOP	1,100	56%	43%	13%
2–6 Aug 2016	HKUPOP	1,187	54%	42%	12%
1–5 Aug 2016	HKUPOP	1,072	54%	42%	12%
31 Jul–4 Aug 2016	HKUPOP	1,158	54%	43%	11%
30 Jul–3 Aug 2016	HKUPOP	1,056	53%	41%	12%
14–29 Jul 2016	HKRA	5,011	53%	39%	14%
20 Jun–7 Jul 2016	PD/HKUPOP	5,084	53%	41%	12%
9 Sep 2012	Last election results	1,815,448	56.2%	42.7%	13.5%

=== Seat projection ===
==== By parties ====
Date(s) conducted	Polling source	Sample size	DAB	PP LSD	Civ	DP	FTU	Lab	NPP	LP	BPA	CP PPI HKRO	AHK	D	Others	Lead
4 Sep 2016	Election result		7	2	5	5	3	1	3	0	1	1	2	1	4	2
29 Aug–2 Sep 2016	HKUPOP	3,164	7	2	5	4	3	1	2	0	1	2	1	1	6	2
29 Aug–1 Sep 2016	HKRA	2,188	7	0	5	4	4	2	3	1	1	1	2	0	5	2
28 Aug–1 Sep 2016	HKUPOP	2,812	6	2	4	4	3	1	3	0	2	2	1	1	6	2
21 Aug–1 Sep 2016	PD/HKUPOP	5,311	7	1	5	5	3	0	2	1	1	3	1	0	6	2
27–31 Aug 2016	HKUPOP	2,515	7	1	4	5	3	0	3	1	1	3	1	0	6	2
26–30 Aug 2016	HKUPOP	2,181	7	1	5	4	3	0	2	1	1	3	1	0	7	2
20–29 Aug 2016	HKRA	5,016	7	0	5	4	2	3	4	1	1	1	1	0	6	2
25–29 Aug 2016	HKUPOP	1,975	7	0	5	5	3	0	2	1	1	3	1	0	7	2
24–28 Aug 2016	HKUPOP	1,784	7	1	5	5	3	0	2	1	1	3	1	0	6	2
23–27 Aug 2016	HKUPOP	1,782	7	1	5	5	3	0	2	1	1	3	2	0	5	2
22–26 Aug 2016	HKUPOP	1,783	7	2	5	5	3	1	2	1	1	1	2	0	5	2
21–25 Aug 2016	HKUPOP	1,789	7	1	5	4	3	1	3	1	1	3	1	0	5	2
20–24 Aug 2016	HKUPOP	1,634	6	1	5	4	3	1	3	1	1	2	2	0	6	1
19–23 Aug 2016	HKUPOP	1,482	7	1	5	4	3	0	4	1	1	2	2	0	5	2
18–22 Aug 2016	HKUPOP	1,331	7	0	5	4	3	1	4	1	1	3	1	0	5	2
17–21 Aug 2016	HKUPOP	1,178	7	0	5	3	2	1	5	0	1	3	1	1	6	2
16–20 Aug 2016	HKUPOP	1,042	7	0	5	3	2	2	4	1	1	2	2	1	5	2
30 Jul–19 Aug 2016	HKRA	5,023	7	0	5	4	2	2	4	1	1	1	2	0	6	2
15–19 Aug 2016	HKUPOP	1,047	7	0	5	2	2	3	4	1	1	2	2	0	6	2
14–18 Aug 2016	HKUPOP	1,045	6	1	4	2	2	2	4	1	1	4	2	0	6	2
13–17 Aug 2016	HKUPOP	1,048	6	1	5	2	2	3	4	1	1	2	2	0	6	1
12–16 Aug 2016	HKUPOP	1,046	5	1	5	3	2	2	4	1	1	2	2	0	7	Tied
11–15 Aug 2016	HKUPOP	1,027	6	2	5	3	2	1	4	0	1	2	2	0	7	1
10–14 Aug 2016	HKUPOP	1,025	7	1	5	2	3	0	5	0	1	2	3	0	6	2
8–13 Aug 2016	HKUPOP	1,028	8	1	5	2	3	0	4	0	1	3	1	0	7	3
8–12 Aug 2016	HKUPOP	1,030	6	1	5	3	2	1	5	0	2	3	1	0	6	2
7–11 Aug 2016	HKUPOP	1,031	5	1	5	4	2	2	4	0	1	2	2	0	7	Tied
6–10 Aug 2016	HKUPOP	1,033	7	1	5	3	1	2	4	0	1	2	2	0	7	2
5–9 Aug 2016	HKUPOP	1,032	7	2	5	2	1	3	4	0	1	1	2	0	7	2
4–8 Aug 2016	HKUPOP	1,024	7	2	5	2	1	3	4	0	1	1	1	0	8	2
3–7 Aug 2016	HKUPOP	1,100	5	2	5	2	2	2	5	0	2	2	1	0	7	Tied
2–6 Aug 2016	HKUPOP	1,187	7	1	5	2	2	3	5	0	1	1	1	0	7	2
1–5 Aug 2016	HKUPOP	1,072	7	1	5	3	3	2	5	0	1	1	2	0	5	2
31 Jul–4 Aug 2016	HKUPOP	1,158	7	1	5	3	2	2	5	0	2	2	0	0	6	2
30 Jul–3 Aug 2016	HKUPOP	1,056	7	1	5	3	3	2	4	0	2	2	0	0	6	2
14–29 Jul 2016	HKRA	5,011	7	2	5	4	2	3	2	1	1	1	1	0	6	2
20 Jun–7 Jul 2016	PD/HKUPOP	5,084	7	2	5	2	2	3	4	1	1	1	1	0	6	2
9 Sep 2012	Last election results	1,815,448	9	4	5	4	3	3	2	1	—N/a	1	—N/a	—N/a	3	4

==== By camps ====
Date(s) conducted	Polling source	Sample size	Anti-establishment	Pro-establishment	Lead
4 Sep 2016	Election result		19	16	3
29 Aug–2 Sep 2016	HKUPOP	3,164	17	16	1
29 Aug–1 Sep 2016	HKRA	2,188	15	18	3
28 Aug–1 Sep 2016	HKUPOP	2,812	17	16	1
21 Aug–1 Sep 2016	PD/HKUPOP	5,311	17	16	1
27–31 Aug 2016	HKUPOP	2,515	16	17	1
26–30 Aug 2016	HKUPOP	2,181	17	16	1
20–29 Aug 2016	HKRA	5,016	17	16	1
25–29 Aug 2016	HKUPOP	1,975	17	16	1
24–28 Aug 2016	HKUPOP	1,784	17	16	1
23–27 Aug 2016	HKUPOP	1,782	18	16	2
22–26 Aug 2016	HKUPOP	1,783	18	16	2
21–25 Aug 2016	HKUPOP	1,789	16	17	1
20–24 Aug 2016	HKUPOP	1,634	17	16	1
19–23 Aug 2016	HKUPOP	1,482	15	18	3
18–22 Aug 2016	HKUPOP	1,331	16	17	1
17–21 Aug 2016	HKUPOP	1,178	17	16	1
16–20 Aug 2016	HKUPOP	1,042	17	16	1
30 Jul–19 Aug 2016	HKRA	5,023	17	16	1
15–19 Aug 2016	HKUPOP	1,047	16	17	1
14–18 Aug 2016	HKUPOP	1,045	17	14	3
13–17 Aug 2016	HKUPOP	1,048	18	15	3
12–16 Aug 2016	HKUPOP	1,046	18	14	4
11–15 Aug 2016	HKUPOP	1,027	18	15	3
10–14 Aug 2016	HKUPOP	1,025	16	17	1
8–13 Aug 2016	HKUPOP	1,028	16	17	1
8–12 Aug 2016	HKUPOP	1,030	17	16	1
7–11 Aug 2016	HKUPOP	1,031	20	13	7
6–10 Aug 2016	HKUPOP	1,033	19	14	5
5–9 Aug 2016	HKUPOP	1,032	19	14	5
4–8 Aug 2016	HKUPOP	1,024	18	14	4
3–7 Aug 2016	HKUPOP	1,100	18	15	3
2–6 Aug 2016	HKUPOP	1,187	16	16	Tied
1–5 Aug 2016	HKUPOP	1,072	16	17	1
31 Jul–4 Aug 2016	HKUPOP	1,158	16	17	1
30 Jul–3 Aug 2016	HKUPOP	1,056	16	17	1
14–29 Jul 2016	HKRA	5,011	19	14	5
20 Jun–7 Jul 2016	PD/HKUPOP	5,084	17	16	1
9 Sep 2012	Last election results	1,815,448	18	17	1

== Opinion polls by constituency ==
Key: 1 seat or 2 seats secured for anti-establishment; 1 seat or 2 seats secured for pro-establishment; secured for non-aligned independent.

=== Hong Kong Island ===
List No.			1	2	3	4	5	6	7	8	9	10	11	12	13	14	15
Date(s) conducted	Polling source	Sample size	CH Wong (PD)	Lau (PP)	Ip (NPP)	Ho (Lab)	Cheung (DAB)	Chim	Cheng (CP)	Law (D)	Shum	WK Wong	Chui	Zimm.	Hui (DP)	Chan (Civ)	Kwok (FTU)
4 Sep 2016	Election result		2.7%	1.9%	16.1%	5.2%	10.9%	0.7%	6.0%	13.5%	0.4%	8.9%	0.2%	0.7%	11.3%	9.4%	12.2%
29 Aug–2 Sep 2016	HKUPOP	Unknown	3%	3%	19%	6%	12%	2%	4%	8%	<1%	11%	1%	<1%	7%	14%	9%
29 Aug–1 Sep 2016	HKRA	Unknown	1.4%	2.0%	20.5%	9.0%	9.9%	1.0%	4.4%	4.4%	0.8%	16.1%	0.8%	3.3%	6.4%	12.8%	7.2%
28 Aug–1 Sep 2016	HKUPOP	Unknown	2%	3%	20%	5%	13%	2%	4%	7%	<1%	12%	1%	<1%	7%	15%	8%
21 Aug–1 Sep 2016	PD/HKUPOP	Unknown	1%	3%	22%	4%	12%	2%	4%	6%	<1%	12%	1%	1%	8%	15%	9%
27–31 Aug 2016	HKUPOP	Unknown	2%	4%	19%	5%	13%	2%	5%	6%	<1%	12%	1%	1%	8%	15%	8%
26–30 Aug 2016	HKUPOP	Unknown	2%	5%	20%	4%	13%	2%	5%	5%	<1%	12%	1%	1%	8%	15%	8%
20–29 Aug 2016	HKRA	Unknown	0.5%	3.3%	24.1%	8.1%	10.4%	0.8%	4.4%	2.1%	0.5%	13.4%	0.3%	2.1%	7.0%	16.5%	6.6%
25–29 Aug 2016	HKUPOP	Unknown	1%	4%	21%	2%	12%	2%	5%	4%	1%	12%	<1%	1%	9%	17%	8%
24–28 Aug 2016	HKUPOP	Unknown	1%	3%	23%	4%	10%	2%	5%	2%	<1%	13%	<1%	2%	9%	17%	8%
23–27 Aug 2016	HKUPOP	Unknown	1%	3%	22%	4%	9%	1%	5%	3%	<1%	13%	<1%	2%	10%	17%	9%
22–26 Aug 2016	HKUPOP	Unknown	<1%	3%	24%	4%	10%	1%	4%	3%	<1%	14%	<1%	2%	10%	16%	9%
21–25 Aug 2016	HKUPOP	Unknown	<1%	2%	27%	4%	8%	1%	3%	3%	1%	16%	<1%	2%	7%	16%	9%
20–24 Aug 2016	HKUPOP	Unknown	<1%	2%	30%	4%	7%	1%	3%	4%	<1%	15%	<1%	2%	7%	16%	8%
19–23 Aug 2016	HKUPOP	241	1%	2%	29%	3%	9%	2%	2%	5%	<1%	13%	<1%	2%	6%	16%	9%
18–22 Aug 2016	HKUPOP	240	1%	2%	32%	2%	8%	2%	2%	5%	<1%	14%	<1%	3%	6%	14%	7%
17–21 Aug 2016	HKUPOP	228	1%	2%	33%	3%	5%	1%	2%	7%	<1%	16%	<1%	3%	5%	18%	5%
16–20 Aug 2016	HKUPOP	211	1%	2%	30%	4%	8%	2%	2%	7%	<1%	11%	1%	4%	5%	19%	5%
30 Jul–19 Aug 2016	HKRA	Unknown	0.5%	2.3%	23.2%	7.7%	10.5%	2.2%	2.9%	1.8%	0.4%	14.2%	0.4%	2.6%	6.5%	19.5%	5.4%
15–19 Aug 2016	HKUPOP	225	1%	2%	28%	9%	9%	2%	2%	5%	<1%	11%	1%	3%	5%	17%	6%
14–18 Aug 2016	HKUPOP	220	2%	2%	27%	11%	7%	2%	3%	4%	<1%	12%	1%	2%	6%	18%	4%
13–17 Aug 2016	HKUPOP	211	3%	3%	25%	12%	8%	2%	4%	3%	<1%	11%	1%	2%	4%	18%	5%
12–16 Aug 2016	HKUPOP	211	3%	2%	26%	12%	10%	3%	5%	2%	<1%	13%	1%	2%	2%	13%	6%
11–15 Aug 2016	HKUPOP	193	3%	2%	25%	11%	9%	2%	6%	1%	<1%	15%	<1%	3%	2%	15%	6%
10–14 Aug 2016	HKUPOP	179	3%	2%	27%	5%	10%	2%	6%	2%	<1%	16%	<1%	3%	2%	15%	6%
8–13 Aug 2016	HKUPOP	184	1%	2%	29%	5%	10%	3%	6%	2%	<1%	17%	1%	3%	2%	13%	7%
8–12 Aug 2016	HKUPOP	190	1%	1%	34%	3%	11%	2%	7%	3%	<1%	16%	2%	2%	2%	11%	6%
7–11 Aug 2016	HKUPOP	180	1%	<1%	31%	4%	10%	3%	6%	3%	<1%	16%	2%	2%	2%	14%	6%
6–10 Aug 2016	HKUPOP	185	1%	<1%	33%	4%	9%	2%	7%	2%	<1%	17%	2%	2%	3%	13%	5%
5–9 Aug 2016	HKUPOP	194	2%	1%	32%	6%	9%	2%	6%	2%	<1%	17%	1%	2%	1%	14%	5%
4–8 Aug 2016	HKUPOP	197	2%	2%	30%	6%	8%	1%	5%	2%	<1%	16%	1%	4%	3%	15%	4%
3–7 Aug 2016	HKUPOP	203	1%	4%	30%	9%	6%	1%	6%	1%	<1%	12%	2%	5%	3%	18%	4%
2–6 Aug 2016	HKUPOP	218	2%	4%	30%	8%	9%	1%	5%	1%	<1%	12%	1%	4%	4%	18%	4%
1–5 Aug 2016	HKUPOP	191	2%	4%	29%	9%	8%	1%	3%	2%	<1%	11%	1%	3%	5%	17%	5%
31 Jul–4 Aug 2016	HKUPOP	192	2%	4%	29%	8%	7%	2%	4%	2%	<1%	11%	1%	3%	6%	17%	5%
30 Jul–3 Aug 2016	HKUPOP	189	2%	2%	25%	7%	8%	2%	3%	1%	<1%	15%	1%	2%	5%	18%	7%
14–29 Jul 2016	HKRA	Unknown	0.6%	0.4%	20.9%	8.7%	14.1%	2.8%	2.9%	2.8%	-	15.6%	-	-	6.6%	17.3%	6.2%
20 Jun–7 Jul 2016	PD/HKUPOP	1,016	0.5%	1.6%	26.3%	8.2%	6.2% (Note: This survey did not include Christopher Chung who was considering to leave the DAB and run as an independent candidate at the time.)	1.8%	1.3%	1.6%	-	14.6%	1.3%	1.9%	5.2%	20.0%	6.2%

=== Kowloon West ===
List No.			1	2	3	4	5	6	7	8	9	10	11	12	13	14	15
Date(s) conducted	Polling source	Sample size	Ng (LSD)	Ho (HKLP)	Mo (Civ)	Leung (BPA/ KWND)	Tam (ADPL)	Chu (PVP)	YM Wong (PPI)	PW Wong (DP)	Lam	Chiang (DAB)	Kwan (PSS)	Lau (DG)	Yau (Y)	Lee	Tik (TS)
4 Sep 2016	Election result		2.4%	0.1%	11.6%	17.8%	5.5%	0.2%	7.3%	9.3%	0.2%	18.8%	0.3%	13.7%	7.4%	0.3%	4.8%
29 Aug–2 Sep 2016	HKUPOP	Unknown	4%	<1%	8%	24%	3%	1%	8%	9%	1%	17%	<1%	11%	7%	1%	5%
29 Aug–1 Sep 2016	HKRA	Unknown	2.6%	0.7%	17.2%	12.8%	4.0%	1.1%	7.7%	13.4%	0.7%	16.6%	0.0%	8.1%	8.8%	0.8%	5.4%
28 Aug–1 Sep 2016	HKUPOP	Unknown	4%	<1%	6%	25%	4%	1%	9%	10%	<1%	19%	<1%	10%	5%	1%	6%
21 Aug–1 Sep 2016	PD/HKUPOP	Unknown	4%	1%	10%	22%	3%	1%	8%	12%	1%	18%	<1%	9%	6%	1%	5%
27–31 Aug 2016	HKUPOP	Unknown	4%	1%	7%	23%	5%	1%	9%	12%	1%	19%	<1%	8%	5%	1%	5%
26–30 Aug 2016	HKUPOP	Unknown	3%	1%	7%	21%	5%	1%	9%	15%	1%	17%	1%	7%	6%	<1%	6%
20–29 Aug 2016	HKRA	Unknown	4.7%	0.1%	18.7%	15.4%	5.1%	0.0%	6.2%	11.1%	0.1%	16.4%	0.1%	6.1%	8.8%	1.8%	5.4%
25–29 Aug 2016	HKUPOP	Unknown	3%	2%	8%	20%	4%	2%	10%	14%	1%	19%	<1%	7%	5%	<1%	5%
24–28 Aug 2016	HKUPOP	Unknown	3%	1%	11%	17%	5%	1%	9%	14%	1%	20%	<1%	7%	6%	<1%	5%
23–27 Aug 2016	HKUPOP	Unknown	3%	1%	13%	18%	5%	1%	8%	15%	1%	16%	<1%	7%	9%	<1%	3%
22–26 Aug 2016	HKUPOP	Unknown	4%	1%	11%	21%	3%	<1%	6%	14%	1%	16%	<1%	9%	9%	<1%	4%
21–25 Aug 2016	HKUPOP	Unknown	4%	<1%	15%	19%	2%	<1%	6%	13%	1%	17%	<1%	10%	6%	<1%	4%
20–24 Aug 2016	HKUPOP	Unknown	4%	<1%	16%	21%	3%	<1%	6%	13%	<1%	14%	1%	11%	7%	1%	4%
19–23 Aug 2016	HKUPOP	233	5%	<1%	14%	22%	4%	<1%	6%	13%	<1%	13%	1%	10%	8%	1%	4%
18–22 Aug 2016	HKUPOP	212	5%	<1%	13%	22%	4%	<1%	8%	12%	1%	15%	<1%	11%	4%	1%	5%
17–21 Aug 2016	HKUPOP	173	4%	<1%	13%	20%	6%	<1%	12%	10%	1%	13%	<1%	10%	6%	1%	4%
16–20 Aug 2016	HKUPOP	145	3%	1%	12%	24%	7%	<1%	13%	11%	<1%	9%	<1%	6%	9%	<1%	6%
30 Jul–19 Aug 2016	HKRA	Unknown	4.9%	0.5%	19.0%	14.0%	5.5%	0.1%	7.8%	10.7%	0.3%	17.5%	0.4%	3.3%	8.0%	1.2%	6.7%
15–19 Aug 2016	HKUPOP	146	2%	1%	17%	20%	6%	<1%	12%	13%	<1%	8%	<1%	5%	8%	<1%	7%
14–18 Aug 2016	HKUPOP	145	1%	1%	19%	19%	4%	<1%	13%	11%	<1%	8%	<1%	6%	8%	<1%	9%
13–17 Aug 2016	HKUPOP	138	1%	1%	19%	18%	5%	<1%	9%	11%	<1%	12%	<1%	5%	11%	<1%	8%
12–16 Aug 2016	HKUPOP	140	2%	1%	21%	18%	4%	2%	6%	11%	<1%	15%	<1%	5%	7%	<1%	9%
11–15 Aug 2016	HKUPOP	131	2%	<1%	19%	22%	5%	3%	4%	7%	<1%	17%	<1%	5%	8%	<1%	8%
10–14 Aug 2016	HKUPOP	129	1%	1%	15%	21%	5%	3%	6%	6%	<1%	23%	<1%	5%	8%	<1%	5%
8–13 Aug 2016	HKUPOP	128	1%	1%	16%	21%	4%	3%	6%	5%	<1%	22%	<1%	5%	9%	1%	5%
8–12 Aug 2016	HKUPOP	129	1%	1%	14%	24%	3%	3%	7%	7%	<1%	20%	<1%	6%	8%	1%	4%
7–11 Aug 2016	HKUPOP	134	<1%	2%	14%	24%	4%	1%	10%	8%	<1%	21%	<1%	3%	8%	2%	4%
6–10 Aug 2016	HKUPOP	141	<1%	1%	17%	19%	4%	<1%	9%	9%	<1%	24%	<1%	3%	5%	1%	6%
5–9 Aug 2016	HKUPOP	145	<1%	<1%	18%	19%	4%	<1%	9%	11%	1%	20%	<1%	2%	7%	2%	7%
4–8 Aug 2016	HKUPOP	155	1%	<1%	16%	19%	3%	<1%	11%	13%	1%	21%	<1%	4%	4%	<1%	6%
3–7 Aug 2016	HKUPOP	156	1%	<1%	18%	22%	3%	1%	11%	12%	1%	21%	<1%	4%	3%	<1%	5%
2–6 Aug 2016	HKUPOP	151	1%	1%	16%	22%	1%	1%	10%	12%	1%	19%	<1%	4%	6%	<1%	6%
1–5 Aug 2016	HKUPOP	129	1%	2%	13%	21%	<1%	1%	12%	14%	1%	18%	<1%	5%	7%	<1%	5%
31 Jul–4 Aug 2016	HKUPOP	115	2%	2%	11%	23%	2%	1%	11%	16%	<1%	18%	<1%	5%	5%	<1%	3%
30 Jul–3 Aug 2016	HKUPOP	97	<1%	2%	15%	25%	2%	1%	16%	12%	<1%	15%	<1%	2%	6%	<1%	3%
14–29 Jul 2016	HKRA	Unknown	0.4%	-	19.2%	9.5%	7.7%	-	12.6%	10.6%	-	16.4%	-	2.6%	9.1%	-	8.1%
20 Jun–7 Jul 2016	PD/HKUPOP	806	1.1%	-	19.8%	16.0%	5.4%	-	11.0%	13.9%	-	17.9%	-	1.8%	7.3%	-	0.3%

=== Kowloon East ===
List No.			1	2	3	4	5	6	7	8	9	10	11	12
Date(s) conducted	Polling source	Sample size	KK Wong (FTU)	SS Wu (Lab)	Ko (VLHK)	HM Tam (TF)	Tse	Or (DAB)	Lui	CW Wu (DP)	MH Tam (Civ)	YT Wong (CP)	Chan (KEC)	TC Tam (PP)
4 Sep 2016	Election result		14.4%	0.8%	0.7%	0.8%	14.5%	15.7%	0.4%	15.3%	13.8%	10.1%	3.9%	9.7%
29 Aug–2 Sep 2016	HKUPOP	Unknown	19%	2%	1%	2%	18%	11%	1%	13%	14%	10%	4%	5%
29 Aug–1 Sep 2016	HKRA	Unknown	15.0%	1.5%	1.5%	2.9%	10.2%	15.9%	0.6%	18.1%	18.4%	7.2%	2.6%	6.1%
28 Aug–1 Sep 2016	HKUPOP	Unknown	18%	2%	<1%	2%	17%	11%	<1%	14%	14%	12%	3%	5%
21 Aug–1 Sep 2016	PD/HKUPOP	Unknown	18%	2%	1%	2%	15%	14%	1%	14%	16%	9%	3%	6%
27–31 Aug 2016	HKUPOP	Unknown	19%	2%	1%	2%	16%	13%	<1%	13%	12%	12%	3%	5%
26–30 Aug 2016	HKUPOP	Unknown	21%	<1%	2%	2%	15%	14%	<1%	15%	14%	9%	2%	4%
20–29 Aug 2016	HKRA	Unknown	15.3%	1.1%	0.8%	3.4%	9.7%	14.9%	0.3%	16.7%	25.9%	6.0%	1.5%	4.2%
25–29 Aug 2016	HKUPOP	Unknown	21%	<1%	2%	1%	12%	16%	<1%	14%	15%	10%	3%	5%
24–28 Aug 2016	HKUPOP	Unknown	20%	1%	2%	1%	11%	16%	<1%	13%	19%	9%	2%	6%
23–27 Aug 2016	HKUPOP	Unknown	21%	1%	2%	1%	12%	16%	<1%	15%	19%	6%	1%	5%
22–26 Aug 2016	HKUPOP	Unknown	17%	1%	1%	1%	11%	15%	1%	17%	22%	6%	2%	6%
21–25 Aug 2016	HKUPOP	Unknown	16%	1%	<1%	2%	12%	15%	1%	16%	21%	7%	2%	7%
20–24 Aug 2016	HKUPOP	Unknown	16%	1%	<1%	1%	12%	16%	1%	15%	21%	8%	3%	6%
19–23 Aug 2016	HKUPOP	240	15%	2%	<1%	1%	11%	19%	1%	16%	18%	8%	4%	6%
18–22 Aug 2016	HKUPOP	205	14%	1%	<1%	1%	12%	19%	2%	15%	17%	8%	4%	6%
17–21 Aug 2016	HKUPOP	183	19%	3%	<1%	2%	9%	16%	1%	17%	17%	7%	5%	5%
16–20 Aug 2016	HKUPOP	159	22%	4%	<1%	1%	12%	13%	1%	17%	13%	9%	4%	4%
30 Jul–19 Aug 2016	HKRA	Unknown	17.1%	1.5%	0.4%	1.5%	9.6%	15.8%	0.3%	18.6%	23.6%	6.2%	1.9%	3.4%
15–19 Aug 2016	HKUPOP	154	20%	4%	1%	1%	16%	14%	<1%	17%	10%	8%	4%	5%
14–18 Aug 2016	HKUPOP	147	19%	4%	1%	1%	21%	13%	<1%	15%	6%	8%	4%	6%
13–17 Aug 2016	HKUPOP	158	15%	4%	1%	2%	19%	10%	<1%	19%	11%	7%	5%	7%
12–16 Aug 2016	HKUPOP	153	12%	3%	1%	1%	18%	14%	<1%	18%	14%	7%	4%	8%
11–15 Aug 2016	HKUPOP	147	15%	3%	1%	2%	15%	14%	<1%	18%	16%	6%	4%	8%
10–14 Aug 2016	HKUPOP	160	20%	3%	<1%	2%	12%	9%	<1%	22%	17%	7%	2%	7%
8–13 Aug 2016	HKUPOP	168	22%	2%	<1%	2%	9%	9%	<1%	23%	17%	8%	2%	7%
8–12 Aug 2016	HKUPOP	158	26%	3%	<1%	1%	10%	10%	<1%	20%	15%	8%	1%	7%
7–11 Aug 2016	HKUPOP	145	24%	3%	<1%	1%	14%	7%	<1%	21%	12%	9%	1%	7%
6–10 Aug 2016	HKUPOP	157	23%	2%	<1%	<1%	13%	11%	<1%	21%	13%	9%	2%	7%
5–9 Aug 2016	HKUPOP	142	21%	2%	1%	<1%	15%	14%	1%	18%	11%	7%	3%	6%
4–8 Aug 2016	HKUPOP	142	15%	3%	1%	1%	15%	12%	2%	23%	12%	9%	3%	5%
3–7 Aug 2016	HKUPOP	171	17%	3%	1%	3%	15%	12%	2%	20%	14%	8%	2%	3%
2–6 Aug 2016	HKUPOP	187	15%	4%	1%	4%	14%	14%	2%	20%	14%	8%	3%	1%
1–5 Aug 2016	HKUPOP	170	15%	4%	1%	5%	15%	11%	2%	21%	14%	8%	3%	1%
31 Jul–4 Aug 2016	HKUPOP	275	15%	4%	<1%	7%	14%	11%	1%	22%	14%	8%	3%	1%
30 Jul–3 Aug 2016	HKUPOP	181	18%	5%	<1%	7%	14%	12%	2%	18%	14%	7%	3%	<1%
14–29 Jul 2016	HKRA	Unknown	12.2%	2.1%	-	-	9.2%	18.4%	-	19.9%	16.9%	8.8%	1.4%	4.5%
20 Jun–7 Jul 2016	PD/HKUPOP	845	13.6%	0.9%	-	-	13.5%	16.8%	-	16.8%	24.8%	4.5%	2.1%	3.6%

=== New Territories West ===
List No.			1	2	3	4	5	6	7	8	9	10	11	12	13	14	15	16	17	18	19	20
Date(s) conducted	Polling source	Sample size	YT Wong (NWSC)	Wan (DP)	Ko (PSS)	Chow (LP)	Cheng (CP)	Kwong	Tien (NPP)	Ho	Leung (DAB/ NTAS)	Kwok (Civ)	HM Wong (LSD/ PP)	Lee (Lab)	CK Wong (Y/ TSWNF)	Mak (FTU)	KK Fung (ADPL)	Chan (DAB)	Cheung	Lui (CTTW)	Tong	Chu
4 Sep 2016	Election result		3.5%	6.9%	0.1%	0.2%	9.0%	0.1%	11.7%	5.9%	8.3%	7.0%	4.7%	5.0%	1.7%	8.2%	3.0%	9.7%	0.4%	0.1%	0.4%	13.9%
29 Aug–2 Sep 2016	HKUPOP	Unknown	5%	10%	<1%	1%	8%	<1%	17%	7%	7%	6%	4%	4%	2%	6%	3%	8%	1%	1%	<1%	12%
29 Aug–1 Sep 2016	HKRA	Unknown	3.2%	8.5%	0.0%	1.7%	6.4%	0.0%	16.2%	5.4%	9.3%	7.0%	4.4%	5.9%	3.9%	7.9%	5.2%	10.0%	0.0%	0.7%	0.1%	4.2%
28 Aug–1 Sep 2016	HKUPOP	Unknown	4%	11%	<1%	<1%	8%	<1%	17%	6%	7%	6%	4%	4%	2%	8%	2%	7%	1%	<1%	<1%	10%
21 Aug–1 Sep 2016	PD/HKUPOP	Unknown	4%	9%	<1%	1%	8%	<1%	16%	7%	8%	7%	4%	5%	3%	8%	3%	7%	<1%	<1%	<1%	9%
27–31 Aug 2016	HKUPOP	Unknown	4%	10%	<1%	<1%	10%	<1%	18%	7%	6%	6%	3%	4%	2%	8%	3%	7%	1%	<1%	<1%	11%
26–30 Aug 2016	HKUPOP	Unknown	4%	10%	<1%	<1%	10%	<1%	17%	8%	7%	6%	4%	4%	2%	8%	3%	7%	1%	<1%	<1%	9%
20–29 Aug 2016	HKRA	Unknown	3.7%	8.8%	0.1%	1.0%	3.5%	0.1%	17.6%	4.8%	7.6%	7.8%	5.0%	9.9%	7.1%	6.5%	5.8%	8.1%	0.4%	0.0%	0.1%	2.1%
25–29 Aug 2016	HKUPOP	Unknown	4%	9%	<1%	<1%	11%	<1%	16%	7%	7%	7%	4%	4%	4%	7%	2%	9%	<1%	<1%	<1%	8%
24–28 Aug 2016	HKUPOP	Unknown	4%	8%	<1%	1%	10%	<1%	14%	8%	7%	6%	5%	5%	6%	9%	3%	8%	<1%	<1%	<1%	8%
23–27 Aug 2016	HKUPOP	Unknown	4%	8%	<1%	1%	7%	<1%	15%	9%	8%	7%	5%	5%	6%	7%	3%	7%	<1%	<1%	<1%	8%
22–26 Aug 2016	HKUPOP	Unknown	4%	8%	<1%	1%	6%	<1%	13%	9%	8%	7%	5%	7%	6%	7%	3%	7%	<1%	<1%	<1%	7%
21–25 Aug 2016	HKUPOP	Unknown	4%	7%	<1%	1%	7%	<1%	13%	8%	10%	9%	5%	6%	5%	8%	3%	7%	<1%	<1%	<1%	6%
20–24 Aug 2016	HKUPOP	Unknown	4%	8%	<1%	1%	7%	<1%	15%	8%	10%	8%	4%	6%	5%	8%	4%	5%	<1%	<1%	1%	5%
19–23 Aug 2016	HKUPOP	393	3%	7%	<1%	2%	6%	<1%	18%	7%	10%	8%	3%	6%	5%	7%	4%	6%	<1%	1%	1%	4%
18–22 Aug 2016	HKUPOP	337	2%	7%	<1%	1%	8%	<1%	18%	6%	10%	9%	4%	7%	3%	8%	3%	8%	<1%	1%	1%	4%
17–21 Aug 2016	HKUPOP	291	2%	7%	<1%	2%	8%	<1%	21%	4%	11%	8%	3%	7%	4%	8%	4%	8%	<1%	1%	1%	3%
16–20 Aug 2016	HKUPOP	259	2%	6%	<1%	2%	7%	<1%	21%	5%	9%	7%	4%	8%	4%	6%	4%	10%	<1%	1%	1%	4%
30 Jul–19 Aug 2016	HKRA	Unknown	3.0%	8.3%	0.4%	1.3%	4.1%	0.1%	16.9%	6.1%	7.6%	8.0%	4.7%	7.3%	7.1%	6.6%	6.2%	8.9%	0.6%	0.0%	0.3%	2.5%
15–19 Aug 2016	HKUPOP	266	3%	4%	<1%	1%	6%	<1%	21%	5%	8%	8%	4%	9%	3%	7%	3%	11%	1%	1%	<1%	4%
14–18 Aug 2016	HKUPOP	270	3%	4%	<1%	1%	8%	<1%	21%	4%	7%	8%	3%	11%	5%	8%	4%	7%	1%	1%	<1%	4%
13–17 Aug 2016	HKUPOP	263	3%	5%	<1%	2%	7%	<1%	20%	5%	7%	7%	3%	9%	6%	8%	7%	6%	1%	2%	<1%	3%
12–16 Aug 2016	HKUPOP	268	3%	6%	<1%	1%	9%	<1%	20%	4%	7%	9%	3%	7%	5%	8%	6%	6%	1%	1%	<1%	3%
11–15 Aug 2016	HKUPOP	271	4%	6%	<1%	1%	7%	<1%	19%	6%	7%	11%	3%	6%	6%	8%	6%	4%	1%	2%	<1%	2%
10–14 Aug 2016	HKUPOP	263	4%	8%	1%	1%	8%	<1%	19%	4%	6%	11%	2%	5%	7%	8%	7%	5%	<1%	2%	<1%	1%
8–13 Aug 2016	HKUPOP	262	6%	9%	1%	1%	6%	<1%	17%	3%	8%	11%	3%	5%	5%	8%	7%	6%	<1%	3%	<1%	2%
8–12 Aug 2016	HKUPOP	265	7%	7%	1%	<1%	6%	<1%	20%	4%	8%	11%	3%	8%	5%	7%	5%	6%	<1%	2%	<1%	1%
7–11 Aug 2016	HKUPOP	271	8%	6%	1%	1%	3%	<1%	19%	5%	5%	13%	4%	8%	7%	5%	6%	5%	<1%	2%	1%	1%
6–10 Aug 2016	HKUPOP	259	8%	6%	1%	1%	4%	<1%	19%	4%	5%	10%	4%	10%	5%	4%	8%	8%	1%	1%	<1%	1%
5–9 Aug 2016	HKUPOP	261	8%	6%	<1%	2%	2%	<1%	18%	5%	6%	8%	4%	14%	8%	3%	7%	6%	1%	1%	<1%	4%
4–8 Aug 2016	HKUPOP	265	6%	4%	<1%	3%	4%	<1%	22%	4%	5%	8%	3%	14%	8%	3%	6%	7%	1%	<1%	<1%	3%
3–7 Aug 2016	HKUPOP	285	4%	4%	<1%	3%	3%	<1%	23%	4%	5%	11%	3%	13%	6%	2%	6%	8%	1%	1%	<1%	5%
2–6 Aug 2016	HKUPOP	321	2%	5%	<1%	2%	4%	<1%	23%	3%	6%	10%	2%	16%	5%	4%	5%	8%	<1%	<1%	<1%	5%
1–5 Aug 2016	HKUPOP	306	2%	5%	<1%	2%	4%	<1%	25%	2%	7%	9%	1%	15%	5%	6%	4%	7%	<1%	1%	<1%	5%
31 Jul–4 Aug 2016	HKUPOP	301	3%	5%	<1%	2%	5%	<1%	25%	3%	8%	10%	1%	15%	4%	6%	5%	7%	<1%	1%	<1%	3%
30 Jul–3 Aug 2016	HKUPOP	303	3%	4%	<1%	1%	5%	<1%	24%	3%	8%	12%	1%	15%	3%	6%	5%	7%	<1%	1%	<1%	3%
14–29 Jul 2016	HKRA	Unknown	4.8%	6.5%	-	1.8%	4.6%	-	15.1%	5.5%	7.4%	11.2%	7.1%	9.8%	0.5%	8.1%	6.7%	8.6%	-	-	-	1.8%
20 Jun–7 Jul 2016	PD/HKUPOP	1,217	2.9%	4.1%	-	2.0%	3.1%	-	18.0%	3.3%	6.0%	9.8%	6.0%	9.3%	5.1%	7.7%	5.7%	6.8%	-	-	-	2.1%

=== New Territories East ===
List No.			1	2	3	4	5	6	7	8	9	10	11	12	13	14	15	16	17	18	19	20	21	22
Date(s) conducted	Polling source	Sample size	Fong	Lam (DP)	Liu	Chin (HKRO/ CP)	KH Leung (LSD)	Cheung (Lab)	Yeung (Civ)	Mak (PD)	Cheng	Quat (DAB)	Hau	TK Lee (LP)	Tang (FTU)	Fan (ND)	YN Chan	Wong	SY Lee (JA)	CC Chan (PP)	CH Leung (Y)	KS Leung	Yung (NPP/ CF)	HK Chan (DAB/ NTAS)
4 Sep 2016	Election result		6.0%	6.8%	0.2%	4.1%	6.1%	8.6%	9.0%	1.4%	3.1%	10.1%	1.2%	3.5%	4.6%	5.4%	0.1%	0.3%	0.5%	7.9%	6.6%	0.1%	6.2%	8.4%
29 Aug–2 Sep 2016	HKUPOP	Unknown	6%	8%	<1%	3%	6%	6%	13%	2%	3%	12%	2%	5%	2%	5%	2%	<1%	1%	6%	7%	<1%	4%	9%
29 Aug–1 Sep 2016	HKRA	Unknown	5.1%	5.8%	0.7%	3.7%	4.6%	3.2%	14.1%	1.2%	4.2%	12.9%	0.7%	5.7%	5.5%	4.6%	0.1%	0.0%	1.5%	1.8%	6.1%	0.4%	6.0%	11.9%
28 Aug–1 Sep 2016	HKUPOP	Unknown	7%	8%	<1%	5%	6%	5%	14%	2%	3%	10%	3%	5%	3%	5%	<1%	1%	1%	5%	6%	<1%	3%	8%
21 Aug–1 Sep 2016	PD/HKUPOP	Unknown	6%	7%	<1%	6%	7%	5%	15%	1%	3%	10%	2%	5%	3%	5%	<1%	<1%	1%	5%	7%	<1%	4%	9%
27–31 Aug 2016	HKUPOP	Unknown	6%	7%	<1%	7%	6%	5%	14%	2%	3%	10%	2%	6%	3%	5%	<1%	1%	1%	5%	7%	<1%	3%	8%
26–30 Aug 2016	HKUPOP	Unknown	6%	5%	<1%	8%	6%	5%	13%	1%	4%	9%	2%	6%	3%	6%	<1%	<1%	<1%	5%	7%	<1%	4%	9%
20–29 Aug 2016	HKRA	Unknown	5.9%	6.8%	0.7%	3.7%	4.1%	5.5%	13.7%	1.0%	6.3%	11.9%	1.0%	8.2%	3.3%	5.3%	0.1%	0.0%	1.1%	3.0%	3.8%	0.7%	5.5%	8.7%
25–29 Aug 2016	HKUPOP	Unknown	6%	6%	<1%	8%	5%	5%	15%	1%	4%	9%	1%	6%	3%	6%	<1%	<1%	<1%	4%	7%	<1%	5%	10%
24–28 Aug 2016	HKUPOP	Unknown	7%	7%	<1%	9%	7%	4%	16%	<1%	3%	7%	1%	5%	3%	4%	<1%	<1%	<1%	4%	8%	<1%	4%	11%
23–27 Aug 2016	HKUPOP	Unknown	4%	7%	<1%	8%	7%	4%	18%	<1%	3%	7%	1%	5%	4%	5%	<1%	<1%	<1%	5%	7%	<1%	3%	11%
22–26 Aug 2016	HKUPOP	Unknown	5%	7%	<1%	7%	7%	5%	18%	<1%	3%	9%	1%	6%	3%	5%	<1%	<1%	<1%	5%	6%	<1%	3%	10%
21–25 Aug 2016	HKUPOP	Unknown	5%	8%	<1%	7%	7%	3%	17%	<1%	4%	12%	<1%	6%	3%	4%	<1%	1%	<1%	4%	7%	<1%	3%	9%
20–24 Aug 2016	HKUPOP	Unknown	6%	8%	<1%	8%	8%	4%	17%	<1%	4%	10%	<1%	6%	3%	4%	<1%	1%	<1%	3%	6%	<1%	3%	8%
19–23 Aug 2016	HKUPOP	375	6%	7%	<1%	7%	6%	4%	18%	<1%	4%	11%	<1%	6%	4%	4%	<1%	1%	<1%	3%	7%	<1%	3%	8%
18–22 Aug 2016	HKUPOP	337	8%	6%	<1%	7%	5%	4%	18%	<1%	6%	10%	<1%	6%	4%	5%	<1%	1%	<1%	1%	8%	<1%	5%	8%
17–21 Aug 2016	HKUPOP	303	7%	5%	<1%	7%	5%	3%	21%	<1%	7%	7%	<1%	3%	3%	6%	<1%	1%	<1%	<1%	9%	<1%	6%	9%
16–20 Aug 2016	HKUPOP	268	11%	4%	<1%	4%	4%	6%	23%	<1%	6%	6%	<1%	5%	4%	8%	<1%	<1%	<1%	<1%	6%	<1%	5%	8%
30 Jul–19 Aug 2016	HKRA	Unknown	6.2%	5.4%	0.3%	3.4%	4.8%	4.4%	16.8%	1.2%	5.2%	13.4%	0.7%	8.1%	3.4%	5.0%	0.1%	0.1%	0.7%	3.0%	4.2%	0.4%	5.9%	7.4%
15–19 Aug 2016	HKUPOP	256	12%	4%	<1%	3%	5%	5%	20%	<1%	7%	9%	<1%	5%	4%	9%	<1%	<1%	<1%	1%	6%	<1%	4%	8%
14–18 Aug 2016	HKUPOP	263	10%	4%	<1%	5%	7%	4%	18%	1%	7%	10%	<1%	5%	3%	9%	<1%	<1%	<1%	2%	5%	<1%	3%	7%
13–17 Aug 2016	HKUPOP	278	10%	4%	<1%	5%	8%	6%	15%	1%	7%	10%	<1%	6%	2%	8%	<1%	<1%	1%	3%	6%	<1%	3%	5%
12–16 Aug 2016	HKUPOP	274	11%	3%	<1%	5%	9%	5%	13%	1%	6%	12%	1%	6%	2%	8%	<1%	<1%	1%	3%	5%	<1%	4%	5%
11–15 Aug 2016	HKUPOP	285	8%	4%	<1%	6%	8%	3%	16%	1%	7%	12%	1%	4%	1%	8%	<1%	<1%	1%	5%	5%	<1%	5%	5%
10–14 Aug 2016	HKUPOP	294	8%	3%	<1%	5%	7%	3%	19%	1%	6%	11%	1%	3%	<1%	7%	<1%	<1%	1%	4%	6%	<1%	6%	7%
8–13 Aug 2016	HKUPOP	286	9%	4%	<1%	5%	6%	4%	17%	<1%	6%	11%	1%	3%	1%	8%	<1%	<1%	1%	3%	4%	1%	7%	7%
8–12 Aug 2016	HKUPOP	288	9%	5%	<1%	4%	5%	4%	20%	<1%	5%	10%	1%	3%	1%	7%	<1%	<1%	<1%	4%	4%	1%	6%	9%
7–11 Aug 2016	HKUPOP	301	8%	5%	<1%	4%	4%	6%	23%	<1%	5%	8%	1%	3%	2%	7%	<1%	<1%	<1%	6%	5%	1%	3%	9%
6–10 Aug 2016	HKUPOP	291	9%	5%	<1%	3%	8%	6%	21%	1%	5%	8%	1%	3%	2%	6%	<1%	<1%	<1%	4%	5%	1%	3%	8%
5–9 Aug 2016	HKUPOP	290	8%	5%	<1%	4%	8%	6%	18%	1%	8%	9%	2%	3%	4%	6%	<1%	<1%	<1%	6%	4%	1%	1%	7%
4–8 Aug 2016	HKUPOP	265	8%	3%	<1%	3%	7%	6%	20%	1%	8%	10%	1%	2%	4%	6%	<1%	<1%	<1%	7%	4%	<1%	3%	7%
3–7 Aug 2016	HKUPOP	285	5%	3%	<1%	1%	7%	4%	24%	1%	8%	11%	1%	3%	5%	7%	<1%	<1%	<1%	6%	3%	<1%	6%	5%
2–6 Aug 2016	HKUPOP	310	7%	4%	<1%	2%	8%	2%	21%	1%	9%	12%	1%	3%	6%	7%	<1%	<1%	2%	4%	1%	<1%	5%	5%
1–5 Aug 2016	HKUPOP	276	6%	5%	<1%	2%	6%	2%	23%	<1%	9%	12%	<1%	3%	6%	6%	<1%	<1%	3%	4%	1%	<1%	6%	5%
31 Jul–4 Aug 2016	HKUPOP	275	9%	5%	<1%	1%	6%	4%	24%	<1%	5%	11%	<1%	3%	5%	6%	<1%	<1%	3%	3%	3%	<1%	6%	5%
30 Jul–3 Aug 2016	HKUPOP	288	7%	6%	<1%	1%	7%	6%	25%	1%	7%	10%	<1%	4%	5%	5%	<1%	<1%	3%	2%	2%	<1%	4%	5%
14–29 Jul 2016 (Note: Hong Kong Indigenous's Edward Leung whose candidacy was rejected by the Electoral Affairs Commission due to his pro-independence stance is not listed on this chart, despite the survey showed that he was expected to win a seat.)	HKRA	Unknown	6.4%	5.4%	0.8%	1.0%	5.7%	6.2%	15.4%	-	-	8.4%	1.9%	10.0%	4.8%	7.5%	-	-	-	5.0%	-	-	4.5%	8.2%
20 Jun–7 Jul 2016	PD/HKUPOP	1,200	7.7%	3.9%	0.1%	1.5%	4.6%	4.9%	21.6%	0.5%	-	9.9%	-	10.4%	3.2%	7.9%	-	-	-	3.1%	-	-	2.5%	8.1%

=== District Council (Second) ===
List No.			801	802	803	804	805	806	807	808	809
Date(s) conducted	Polling source	Sample size	To (DP)	Lee (DAB)	Kwong (DP)	Ho (ADPL)	Chan (Civ)	Wong (FTU)	Kwan (ND)	Leung (NWSC)	Chow (DAB)
4 Sep 2016	Election result		12.8%	15.9%	25.7%	0.9%	1.5%	12.2%	1.2%	15.9%	13.8%
29 Aug–2 Sep 2016	HKUPOP	Unknown	23%	24%	10%	2%	5%	12%	1%	12%	11%
29 Aug–1 Sep 2016	HKRA	Unknown	22.3%	29.4%	7.0%	4.0%	6.7%	8.7%	4.3%	10.0%	7.4%
28 Aug–1 Sep 2016	HKUPOP	Unknown	24%	24%	10%	2%	5%	12%	1%	12%	10%
21 Aug–1 Sep 2016	PD/HKUPOP	Unknown	25%	24%	9%	1%	5%	12%	2%	12%	9%
27–31 Aug 2016	HKUPOP	Unknown	25%	25%	9%	2%	6%	13%	1%	11%	9%
26–30 Aug 2016	HKUPOP	Unknown	25%	25%	8%	1%	6%	13%	2%	12%	9%
20–29 Aug 2016	HKRA	Unknown	24.4%	28.4%	5.7%	4.8%	5.4%	9.7%	4.5%	12.0%	6.1%
25–29 Aug 2016	HKUPOP	Unknown	26%	25%	8%	1%	6%	11%	2%	12%	9%
24–28 Aug 2016	HKUPOP	Unknown	26%	24%	8%	1%	6%	12%	2%	13%	8%
23–27 Aug 2016	HKUPOP	Unknown	27%	22%	8%	1%	6%	11%	2%	14%	8%
22–26 Aug 2016	HKUPOP	Unknown	27%	22%	8%	1%	6%	11%	2%	15%	8%
21–25 Aug 2016	HKUPOP	Unknown	26%	24%	8%	1%	5%	11%	2%	14%	8%
20–24 Aug 2016	HKUPOP	Unknown	25%	25%	9%	1%	4%	12%	1%	14%	9%
19–23 Aug 2016	HKUPOP	1,379	27%	28%	8%	1%	4%	11%	2%	12%	8%
18–22 Aug 2016	HKUPOP	1,240	26%	29%	8%	1%	3%	10%	1%	13%	9%
17–21 Aug 2016	HKUPOP	1,103	29%	28%	9%	<1%	3%	9%	2%	12%	9%
16–20 Aug 2016	HKUPOP	965	30%	28%	8%	1%	3%	8%	2%	14%	7%
30 Jul–19 Aug 2016	HKRA	Unknown	27%	29%	8%	1%	4%	10%	4%	12%	6%
15–19 Aug 2016	HKUPOP	973	31%	27%	8%	1%	4%	8%	2%	14%	6%
14–18 Aug 2016	HKUPOP	966	32%	26%	8%	1%	4%	7%	2%	15%	6%
13–17 Aug 2016	HKUPOP	979	32%	27%	8%	1%	5%	7%	2%	14%	6%
12–16 Aug 2016	HKUPOP	978	31%	29%	6%	1%	5%	8%	2%	13%	6%
11–15 Aug 2016	HKUPOP	966	32%	27%	6%	1%	5%	8%	2%	12%	6%
10–14 Aug 2016	HKUPOP	955	30%	27%	7%	1%	5%	8%	2%	13%	6%
8–13 Aug 2016	HKUPOP	953	30%	27%	6%	1%	6%	9%	2%	13%	6%
8–12 Aug 2016	HKUPOP	947	29%	26%	5%	1%	5%	10%	2%	14%	6%
7–11 Aug 2016	HKUPOP	946	33%	24%	6%	1%	6%	9%	3%	14%	6%
6–10 Aug 2016	HKUPOP	939	32%	27%	5%	1%	5%	8%	2%	13%	5%
5–9 Aug 2016	HKUPOP	945	33%	28%	4%	1%	5%	8%	2%	13%	5%
4–8 Aug 2016	HKUPOP	949	33%	29%	4%	1%	4%	8%	3%	12%	6%
3–7 Aug 2016	HKUPOP	1,007	34%	29%	4%	1%	3%	7%	3%	13%	5%
2–6 Aug 2016	HKUPOP	1,094	31%	31%	5%	2%	3%	7%	2%	13%	5%
1–5 Aug 2016	HKUPOP	992	31%	29%	6%	2%	3%	8%	3%	13%	5%
31 Jul–4 Aug 2016	HKUPOP	994	32%	29%	6%	2%	3%	8%	3%	12%	5%
30 Jul–3 Aug 2016	HKUPOP	991	32%	27%	6%	2%	4%	8%	3%	12%	6%
14–29 Jul 2016	HKRA	Unknown	28.0%	23.3%	5.6%	2.3%	7.1%	8.1%	2.7%	10.6%	7.5%
20 Jun–7 Jul 2016	PD/HKUPOP	5,084	29.9%	27.4%	4.2%	1.6%	5.5%	4.9%	2.5%	10.7%	6.2%

== Methodology ==
- University of Hong Kong Public Opinion Programme (HKUPOP) rolling survey was co-sponsored by HK01, now Broadband TV, Cable TV and Power for Democracy. It interviewed no less than 200 Cantonese-speaking Hong Kong registered voters of 18 years old or above each day by telephone. Telephone numbers are randomly generated using known prefixes assigned to telecommunication services providers under the Numbering Plan provided by the Office of the Communications Authority (OFCA). To ensure representativeness of the findings, the raw data collected was rim-weighted according to the age-gender distributions of registered voters in each geographical constituency based on the 2016 register of electors provided by the government.

== See also ==
- Opinion polling for the Hong Kong legislative election, 2012
