= Civic Passion–Proletariat Political Institute–Hong Kong Resurgence Order =

CP–PPI–HKRO 熱普城
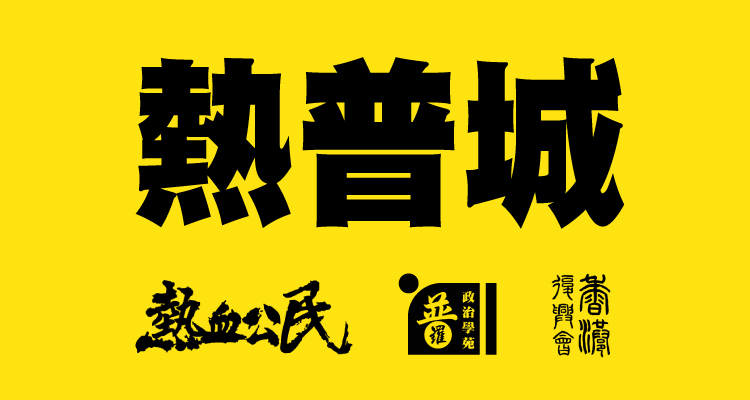
- Leader: Wong Yeung-tat
- Founded: 29 February 2016
- Dissolved: 5 September 2016
- Membership: Civic Passion, Proletariat Political Institute, Hong Kong Resurgence Order
- Ideology: Nativism; Right-wing localism Right-wing populism

A localist political alliance was formed by three Hong Kong organisations – Civic Passion, Proletariat Political Institute and Hong Kong Resurgence Order – to field candidates to contest the 2016 legislative election. The alliance is called Yit Po Shing (Chinese: 熱普城; Jyutping: jit6 pou2 sing4) in Chinese, taking one word from each of the member organisation's name or ideology. The alliance's common platform is "Creating a de facto referendum in five constituencies; allow all citizens to participate in the creation of constitution".

The alliance was dissolved after the election, in which one member of Civic Passion was elected.

== Background ==
Wong Yuk-man and Wong Yeung-tat previously contested the 2012 election under the flag of People Power. While Wong Yuk-man was elected, Wong Yeung-tat suffered a narrow defeat. People Power was then transformed from an electoral alliance into a political party, through a coalition of several parties. After the election, Wong Yeung-tat cut ties with People Power and expanded Civic Passion, which had been established as part of his own election campaign. Wong Yuk-man's Proletariat Political Institute (PPI) was a founding member of People Power; however, his disagreement with People Power over the 2014 electoral reform and Occupy Central action plans saw the breakaway of PPI in 2013.

Chin Wan, considered one of the pioneers of localist political thought for his "Hong Kong City-State Theory", founded the Hong Kong Resurgence Order in 2014 with the aim of "restoring Chinese civilisation".

== Alliance ==
The New Territories East by-election early in 2016 was the first time a candidate contesting under a localist banner. Supported by many organisations in the localist camp and boosted by the Mong Kok civil unrest, Hong Kong Indigenous's Edward Leung received 15% of the votes. Despite failure in winning a seat, its better-than-expected results encouraged the localist camp to actively field candidate to contest the general election in September. On 29 February 2016, the day after the by-election, Civic Passion (CP), Proletariat Political Institute (PPI) and Hong Kong Resurgence Order (HKRO) jointly announced they would form an alliance to contest all of the 5 geographical constituencies.

The candidates include:

- Hong Kong Island: Alvin Cheng (CP), Bonix Chung (CP)
- Kowloon West: Wong Yuk-man (PPI), Ma Yu-sang (PPI)
- Kowloon East: Wong Yeung-tat (CP)
- New Territories West: Cheng Chung-tai (CP), Cheung Yiu-sum (CP)
- New Territories East: Chin Wan (HKRO), Marco Lee (CP)

== Ideology ==
The ideology of the alliance is mostly based on Chin's "City-State Theory". Instead of striving for independence from China, they advocated a constitutional reform by all citizens through a de facto referendum, in the form of a by-election triggered by one legislator resigning from each of the five geographical constituencies. After the amendment to the Basic Law was accepted by the communist party, the autonomy of Hong Kong would be guaranteed even after the original deadline of 2047.

== Results ==
Of the 5 candidate lists fielded by the alliance, only one was returned to the Legislative Council. Cheng Chung-tai was elected to represent New Territories West with a 9.03% support, while incumbent legislator Wong Yuk-man suffered a narrow defeat of 424 votes to Yau Wai-ching of Youngspiration (ALLinHK). After ending again at the 6th place in the 5-seat Kowloon East constituency, Wong Yeung-tat resigned from the leadership of Civic Passion, to be succeeded by Cheng Chung-tai.

As the movement leader, Wong Yeung-tat conceded defeat and admitted a lack of public support for their constitutional movement. The alliance was dissolved after the 2016 LegCo election, as announced by Chin Wan on 5 September 2016. Proletariat Political Institute would provide political training for the youth. But in early 2017, Civic Passion and Passion Times were separated.

== See also ==
- 2010 Hong Kong by-election (dubbed by the initiators as "Five Constituencies Referendum")
- Hong Kong Autonomy Movement
