= Judianna Wai-ling Barnes =

Hong Kong High Court judge

The Honourable Mrs Justice Judianna Wai-ling Barnes
- 張慧玲

Judge, Hong Kong High Court
- Incumbent
- Assumed office 24 November 2006

Judianna Wai-ling Barnes (Chinese: 張慧玲; born 29 October 1952) is a judge in the Hong Kong High Court. She has ruled in a number of notable and widely reported cases, including those concerning applications of bail filed by politician and activist Agnes Chow, and in the acquittal of politician and legislator, Wong Yuk-man, after he threw a glass at Hong Kong Chief Executive Leung Chun-ying.

== Biography ==
Barnes was born on 29 October 1952 in China. She completed an LL.B. from the University of Hong Kong in 1981, and a P.C.LL. in 1982. She went on to earn an M.Sc. in forensic and legal psychology from the University of Leicester.

== Career ==
Barnes joined the Hong Kong Bar in 1982, practicing privately until 1989. In 1989, she was appointed as a magistrate and was promoted to District Judge in 1997. She became a judge in the Hong Kong High Court on 24 November 2006.

During her tenure as a judge, Barnes has ruled in several notable cases.

In 2016, Barnes overturned a sentence awarded to legislator Ted Hui Chi-fung, after a magistrate required him to sign a 'good behavior bond' following an incident during a protest that he had organised. Pointing to the absence of any prior record of violence, she held that the bond was not necessary.

In 2018, Barnes quashed the conviction of former legislator, Wong Yuk-man, after he threw a glass at Hong Kong Chief Executive Leung Chun-ying, and was subsequently convicted of assault. Barnes ruled that there was insufficient evidence to prove the offence of assault, pointing to the lack of reaction by Chun-ying after the glass was initially thrown. The incident, and Barnes' ruling, attracted extensive discussion in the press. In 2019, she sentenced an 89-year-old man who had killed his terminally ill wife to only two years in prison, allowing his release within a month based on time served, and called for "justice to be tempered with mercy". The decision was widely reported and discussed, in the context of debates on the legalization of euthanasia.

In November 2021, she issued a ruling releasing Ka Wan-lung, a student activist, holding that he had been wrongly convicted of assaulting a police officer during the 2019–2020 Hong Kong protests. Also in August 2021, she granted bail to activist Chow Hang-tung, who had been charged with incitement after organizing a rally in memory of the 1989 Tiananmen Square protests and massacre. In 2020, Barnes denied bail to another activist, Agnes Chow, during her appeal against a 10-month sentence for her participation in the 2019–2020 Hong Kong protests.
