= Hong Kong Autonomy Movement =

Political movement favouring autonomy from Beijing

Hong Kong Autonomy Movement 香港自治運動
- Abbreviation: HKAM
- Founded: May 2011
- Ideology: Localism (HK); Autonomism; Hong Kong nationalism Non-independence
- Political position: Big tent
- Colors: Blue

Party flag

Hong Kong Autonomy Movement (Chinese: 香港自治運動), sometimes known as the Hong Kong City State Autonomous Movement (Chinese: 香港城邦自治運動), is a movement formed in Hong Kong amidst the raising awareness about Hong Kong's constitutional rights of high autonomy, free from interference of PRC government, as stipulated in Hong Kong Basic Law Article 2 and Article 22.

The Movement runs on the basis of the book 香港城邦論 (roughly translated: "Hong Kong City-State Theory") by Hong Kong scholar Chin Wan, in which Chin argues that Hong Kong possesses the characteristics of a city-state.

The Movement advocates that, under the principles of the Hong Kong Basic Law and one country, two systems, Hong Kong may enjoy the right to autonomy, subject to it not advocating or suggesting an independent Hong Kong. Chin Wan was the movement's advocate and consultant. Allied scholars and cultured individuals include former Wan Chai District Council members Kam Pui-wai, Ada Ying-kay Wong; Hong Ko-fung, Chip Tsao, Chau Siu-cheung, and others.

== Goals ==
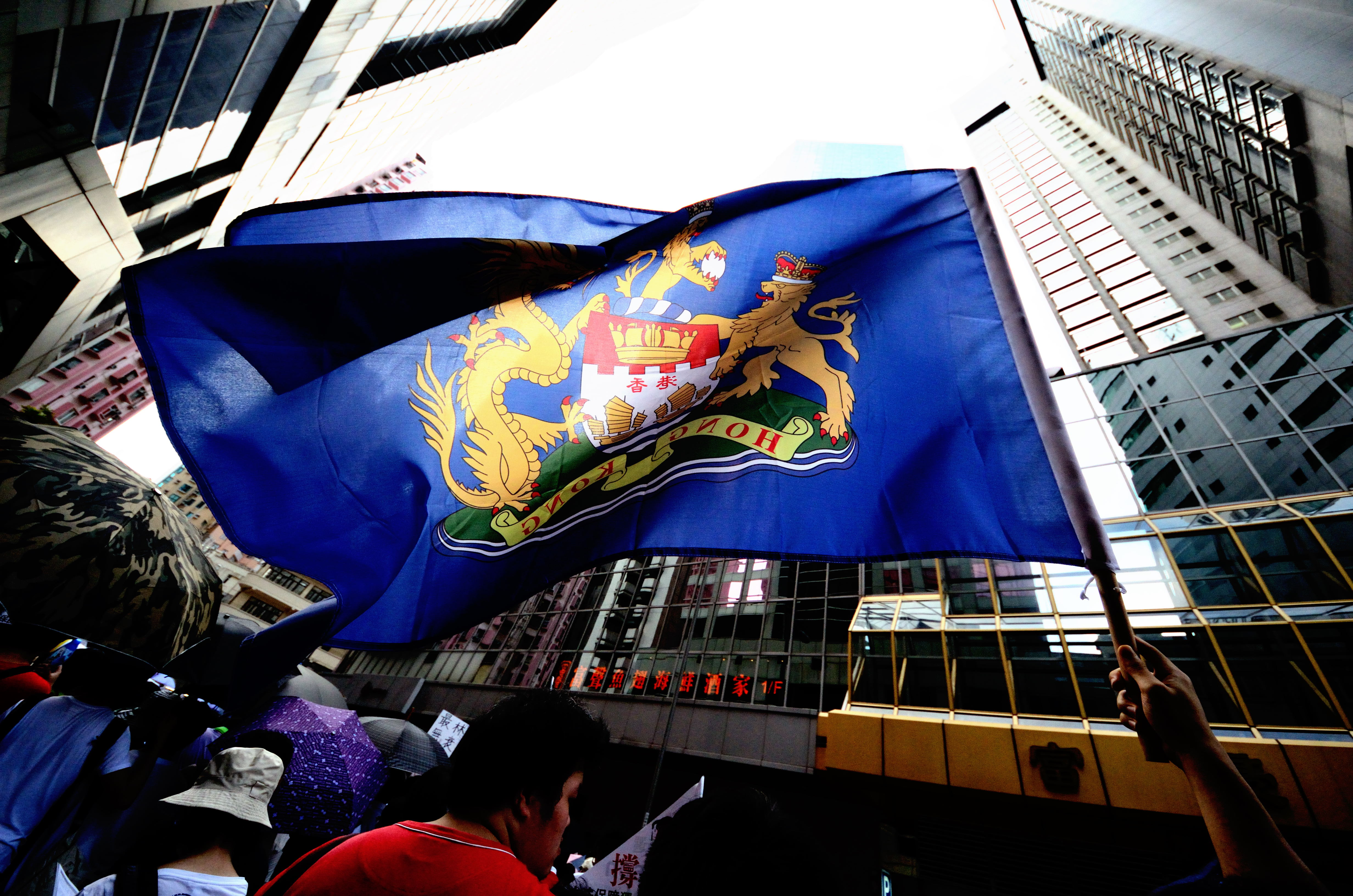
Hong Kong Autonomy Movement Flags at the 1 July March in 2011

- Universal suffrage, allowing a fully democratically elected Chief Executive and Legislative Council.
- Ensure the Hong Kong government's policy-making does not stray from the goal of securing the long term interests of Hong Kong people.
- Implement long-term planning for housing and property policies, ensuring Hong Kong people adequate access to housing.
- Revive Hong Kong's agriculture and industries.
- Reconfigure Hong Kong's migration policy, taking back the power of immigration approval from Mainland China.
- Reflect on the implementation of the Hong Kong Basic Law, and perfect the constitutional process.
- Defense of the Hong Kong City-State. Reject "Mainlandising" policies such as the Co-ordinated Development of the Greater Pearl River Delta Townships Scheme, and the "brainwashing" of pro-Communist moral and national education.
- Create a Hong Kong languages policy, defending Hong Kong's culture.
- Reflect on currency and monetary policies, reinforcing financial autonomy.

== Difference from nativism ==
In the West, nativism opposes all new foreign immigrants and newcomers, Hong Kong Autonomy Movement proponents claim to support equal rights for people of different races and foreign origin, and advocate to eliminate the inequality of rights between ethnic Chinese and foreigners, including birth rights, residency rights and election rights.

== Historic background ==
In the latter half of May 2011, scholar Chin Wan pointed out that the Tiananmen massacre triggered the Hong Kong People's "Fear of China", and that Hong Kong's pan-democracy camp suggested a "Democratic Resistance against Communism" approach to calm the population. However, the Five Constituencies Referendum failed to advance democracy in the territory, and Chin accuses the Democratic Party of Hong Kong of taking no action other than chanting slogans, such as "build a democratic China", and calling for the political rehabilitation of the Tiananmen massacre, failing to act in the best interests of Hong Kong, effectively submitting to the Chinese Communist Party. He also criticized the Individual Visit Scheme and the Moral and National Education curriculum as signs of loss of local values and mainland invasion. Chin Wan said, (translation) "The Chinese communist government is not afraid of a group of Hong Kong people that begs pitifully for democracy, they have become contemptuous, and no longer bother with even a perfunctory gesture." He believed that without an overt goal of Hong Kong autonomy, there is no hope for the Hong Kong populace, and the democratic movement would not last. He urges Hong Kong to be determined in its pursuit of autonomy, fortifying Hong Kong's political foundation. On 30 May 2011, a Facebook page for the Hong Kong Autonomy Movement was created.

== Philosophical basis of conflict ==
Chin states that the reason behind the escalating tensions between mainland China and Hong Kong were due to Beijing's constantly relaxing restrictions on the Individual Visit Scheme, attempts at implementing the controversial National Education subject, writing off the history and standards from the British colonial era, leading to many Hong Kong people believing in the degradation of "one country, two systems". Beijing looks upon the culture of the colonial government and elements of Chinese culture preserved by the colonial government, such as Cantonese pronunciation and traditional Chinese characters, as well as local slang, as either relics of a past era, or colonial remnants that need to be actively eradicated. Even modern concepts of separation of powers, judicial independence, protections for human rights, that were introduced into Hong Kong by the colonial government, were seen as part of a tyrannical colonial rule, and are to be slowly forgotten, to facilitate the establishment of either a Chinese soviet or communistic system. Chin says that the Communist regime promised and yet continually denies Hong Kong people self-rule, and he therefore expects the tensions between Hong Kong and the Mainland to continue escalating. He said, (translation) "If the Hong Kong people do not resist, and the international community does not monitor this, Hong Kong will end up under "one country, one system". In other words, an illegal colonial rule by China. Whether this will come to be depends on if the Hong Kong people can awake and resist, pursuit universal suffrage and resist all illegal Chinese Communist interference according to the Basic Law. Hong Kong's Basic Law is concise, and is a very good 'mini-constitution', giving legal basis for resistance."

== Comments ==
Member of the National Committee of CPPCC Lew Mon-hung compared the Hong Kong Autonomy Movement to the Taiwan Independence Movement, and believes that the Hong Kong Autonomy Movement is covertly instigated and planned by former Consulate General of the United States in Hong Kong, Stephen Young, in an attempt to split Hong Kong away from China.

== Organizations ==
- Hong Kong Resurgence Order
- Civic Passion
- Passion Times

== Figures ==
- Chin Wan
- Cheng Chung-tai
- Alvin Cheng
- Wong Yeung-tat
- Cheung Yiu-sum
- Hitsujiko Nakade

== See also ==
- Special Administrative Region
- Politics of Hong Kong
- Jimmy Lai
- HK First
- Neo Democrats
- Claudia Mo
- Gary Fan
- Localist camp
- Federalism in China
- CP–PPI–HKRO
- Hong Kong independence movement
