= Chin Wan =

Hong Kong localist scholar (born 1961)

- 陳云根
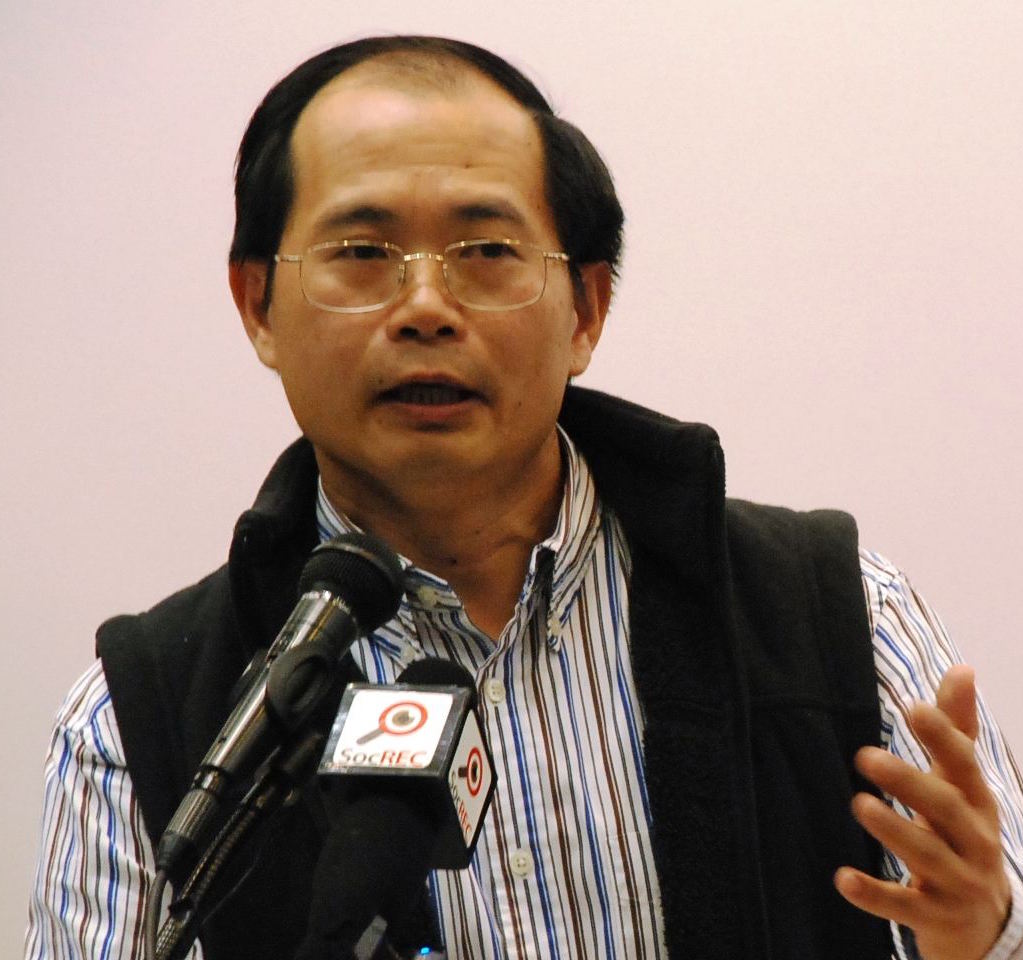
- Chin Wan in 2012
- Born: 8 November 1961 (age 64); Hong Kong
- Education: Chinese University of Hong Kong; University of Göttingen
- Occupations: Scholar and writer
- Notable work: On the Hong Kong City-State series
- Movement: Hong Kong Resurgence Order

Chinese name
- Traditional Chinese: 陳云根
Transcriptions
Yue: Cantonese
- Yale Romanization: Chàhn Wàhn gān
- Jyutping: Can4 Wan4 gan1

Chin Wan
- Traditional Chinese: 陳雲
Transcriptions
Yue: Cantonese
- Yale Romanization: Chàhn Wàhn
- Jyutping: Can4 Wan4
- Website: Chin Wan on Facebook

Horace Chin Wan-kan (born 8 November 1961), better known by his pen name Chin Wan, is a Hong Kong scholar advocating localism, best known for his publications On the Hong Kong City-State series. He is the founder and leader of the Hong Kong Resurgence Order and is the ideological leader of the "Hong Kong Autonomy Movement," dubbed as the "godfather of localism" in Hong Kong. Until mid-2016, Chin was an assistant professor at the Department of Chinese of Lingnan University.

== Biography ==
=== Background ===
Chin was born in Hong Kong in 1961. His father, a Traditional Chinese medicine practitioner, was born in Malaysia and came to Hong Kong in 1950. He received a Bachelor of Arts degree in English at the Chinese University of Hong Kong in 1986. He later studied in Germany, obtaining a doctorate in ethnology from the University of Göttingen in 1995. He returned to Hong Kong and worked at the Policy Research Institute between 1995 and 1996 and was a senior advisor to the HKSAR government on cultural, arts, and civic affairs from 1997 and worked as research director in the Home Affairs Bureau until 2007.

Chin became one of the leading critical intellectual voices against the destruction of local communities and historical edifices that occurred in the course of urban redevelopment. Many of the newspaper columns, which he wrote under the pen name Chin Wan, supported the young radicals who took an increasingly militant stance against Hong Kong and Chinese real estate tycoons and Beijing's intervention in Hong Kong. In 2009, he was hired as assistant professor at the Department of Chinese of the Lingnan University. He held his teaching post until mid-2016 when his contract was not renewed, allegedly due to his localist views.

=== "Godfather of localism" ===
In 2011, Chin published the book On the Hong Kong City-State. His analysis of what he considered China's "neo-imperialist" stance in Hong Kong, and his repositioning of the democracy movement in "localist camp" terms, triggered fierce public debate and was popular among the young generation. Chin emphasised the significance of Hong Kong autonomy for the sake of Hongkongers.

Chin argued that a democratic China could hurt Hong Kong more as populism will reign in the democratic Chinese legislature, dissolving the "one country, two systems" commitment and Hong Kong's valuable resources would become fair game to a voracious China. "What we Hongkongers need is not a democratic China, but to build Hong Kong into an autonomous city-state first, merging the British culture with a restored Chinese culture," wrote Chin. He suggested that Hongkongers should push for a "Chinese Confederation" consisting of separate and parallel states in China, Taiwan, Hong Kong and Macau. He strongly criticised the candle vigil for the 1989 Tiananmen Square protests organised by the Hong Kong Alliance in Support of Patriotic Democratic Movements of China in 2013 for their Chinese patriotic sentiment in their slogan. He blamed the mainstream pro-democrat politicians for the failure of the Hong Kong democracy movement, accusing them of betraying the Hong Kong people by colluding with the United States and China. He also strongly criticised the left-leaning activists, stating them as the reason of the failure of the social movements and their pro-immigrant and cosmopolitan stance.

Chin advocates "Hong Kong First" and "Hong Kong-China separation" positions and opined that the influx of mainland tourists and immigrants was the largest threat to the established institutions and social customs of Hong Kong, and part of the scheme of Beijing's colonisation. He called for actions from the radical activists against the tourists and advocated violent actions as the means for defending Hong Kong's autonomy. Chin's opinions triggered huge arguments within the pro-democracy activists and he was condemned "xenophobic" and "nativist" by the mainstream activists and the government.

Chin became well known for his inflammatory remarks on Facebook and enjoyed a growing, loyal following on the Internet as of 2012. In 2014 he made a remark on Facebook saying that "the Communist Party cannot slaughter Hong Kong men, nor can it publicly rape Hong Kong women. So it uses soft methods to send the mainland vagina to Hong Kong. With the roles of wife, lover and prostitute, the vagina and uterus of Hong Kong women are scrapped." He became the advisor of an autonomy organisation. More radical elements took his idea further, expressing a yearning for the bygone days of British rule, waving colonial flags, and even advocated for Hong Kong independence, from which Chin himself draws a line.

During the 2014 Hong Kong protests, Chin called for militant actions in contrast to the non-violent movement advocated by the mainstream organisers, Occupy Central with Love and Peace, Hong Kong Federation of Students and Scholarism. He had criticised the Occupy organisers even before the protests, stating their peaceful approaches would achieve nothing but their own personal moral high ground. He was later on asked to report to the police on suspicion of inciting and organising an unauthorised assembly.

=== 2016 LegCo bid ===
He joined an electoral alliance with Civic Passion led by Wong Yeung-tat and incumbent legislator Wong Yuk-man to contest in the 2016 Legislative Council election after a localist activist Edward Leung of Hong Kong Indigenous received a better-than-expected result in the 2016 New Territories East by-election in which Leung grabbed more than 66,000 votes. Chin contested in the New Territories East with the slogan of "creating a de facto referendum in five constituencies; allow all citizens to participate in the creation of constitution". Chin's list received 23,635 votes, four percent of the total votes, ranking 13th place and was not elected.

On 2 March 2021, Chin stated on Facebook that he and some Hong Kong youths established a new party — Hong Kong Civile Party.

== See also ==
- Hong Kong Autonomy Movement
- Localism in Hong Kong
- Wong Yeung-tat
- Wong Yuk-man
