= Localist camp =

Hong Kong political groups favoring autonomy

Localist camp 本土派
- Founded: c. 2010s
- Ideology: Localism (HK); Hong Kong nationalism Liberalism (HK); Factions: Anarchism (HK); Anti-authoritarianism; Cultural conservatism Cultural liberalism Libertarianism; Populism; Progressivism; Anti-communism; Hong Kong independence
- Regional affiliation: Pro-democracy camp
- Colours: Blue, yellow
- Legislative Council: 0 / 90 (0%)
- District Councils: 0 / 470 (0%)

Localist camp
- Traditional Chinese: 本土派
Transcriptions
Yue: Cantonese
- Jyutping: Bun^{2} tou^{2} paai^{3}

Localist and self-determination groups
- Traditional Chinese: 本土自決派
Transcriptions
Yue: Cantonese
- Jyutping: Bun^{2} tou^{2} zi^{6} kyut^{3} paai^{3}

The localist camp are the various groups with localist ideologies in Hong Kong. It emerged from post-80s social movements in the late 2000s which centred on the preservation of the city's autonomy and local lifestyles and opposed the perceived growing encroachment of the Chinese government on the city's management of its own political, economic, and social affairs.

Although grouped together with the pro-democracy camp, they have a distinct view as they advocate for Hongkongers’ right to self-determination. While milder elements advocates for greater autonomy while remaining part of China, the more radical elements call for the return to British rule or full independence as a sovereign state. Some also advocate for a more aggressive and militant stance against the mainland government in defending local interests. For that reason, they are labelled as "radicals" and "separatists" by the Chinese government.

The localists gained significant traction following widespread protests in 2014 against the Chinese government's decision to pre-screen Chief Executive candidates before allowing them to be chosen by the general public in the 2017 election. Following these protests, a number of localist political parties were formed, organising protests and participated in Legislative Council elections. They won a total numbers of six seats (excluding Claudia Mo) with 19 per cent of vote share (excluding Claudia Mo and Gary Fan) in the 2016 Legislative Council election.

After the 2016 election, localists such as Nathan Law, Lau Siu-lai, Baggio Leung and Yau Wai-ching were unseated from the Legislative Council over the oath-taking controversy. In the aftermath of the 2019–2020 Hong Kong protests, localists were largely absorbed into the broader spectrum of the pro-democracy camp. As a result of the 2020 national security law, many localist parties dissolved and many notable localist figures were arrested or went into exile.

== History ==
=== Post-80s movements ===
The localist camp emerged from the post-80s generation born in the 1980s, (Millennials in western terminology) social movements in the late 2000s. Many were inspired by the large-scale mass demonstration in 2003. 7.1 People Pile was one of the groups that came to exist after the demonstration. They were upset by rapid urban development which was sweeping away old neighbourhoods and communities. They were strongly opposed to the political and economic monopoly of vested interests, collusion between business and government and questioned the nature of the capitalist system in Hong Kong. Coinciding with the widespread Chinese patriotism at the time was several emerging conservation movements led by young activists, such as Christina Chan and Land Justice League, protesting against demolition of the Edinburgh Place Ferry Pier, Queen's Pier, and the buildings on Lee Tung Street (known as "Wedding Card Street") in 2006 and 2007. Protests against the construction of the Hong Kong section of the high-speed rail link to Guangzhou (XRL) escalated in 2009 and 2010 and established a new high point of the localist movement.

=== Radical localism ===
The failure of the peaceful anti-XRL protests damaged the reputation of the moderate activists. Some turned to a more radical approach. Scholar Chin Wan published the book, On the Hong Kong City-State in 2011 which triggered fierce public debate and was popular among the young generation. In the book, Chin suggests abandoning the hope for a democratic China and positions the democracy movement in a "localist" perspective, to counter Beijing's "neo-imperialist" policies toward Hong Kong. It analysed the potential threat of the influx of mainland tourists and immigrants to the established institutions and social customs of Hong Kong, which he considered likely to be part of a colonisation scheme by Beijing, including the increasing use of Mandarin Chinese and Simplified Chinese in daily use and schools. Since then, it has created a paradigm shift on Hong Kong local consciousness from the moderate discourse of reinterpreting colonial history, cherishing the inclusive and diverse nature of the Hong Kong culture to the radical discourse of anti-Chinese sentiment and nostalgia for British rule. Chin also tells his Hong Kong Autonomy Movement followers to use violent action as the means for defending Hong Kong's autonomy.

At the same time, the localists are hostile toward the pan-democracy camp, as they perceived the pan-democrats' cosmopolitanism as unrealistic and their wish for a democratic China at Hong Kong's expense, which they disagreed with the "Chinese patriotic" theme in the annual candlelight vigil for the 1989 Tiananmen Square protests and massacre organised by the pro-democracy Hong Kong Alliance in Support of Patriotic Democratic Movements of China. They are also dissatisfied with the perceived ineffectiveness of the pan-democrats as the opposition party for the past 20 years. On the other hand, the nativist tendency of the localist movements was condemned as "xenophobic" by mainstream activists and the government. He suggested building Hong Kong into an autonomous city-state, merging the British culture with a restored Chinese culture. The conflict between the moderate and the radical of the movement resulted in great disunity of the whole democratic cause.

=== Umbrella Revolution and aftermath ===
The 79-day large-scale occupation protest was perceived to boost the local consciousness of the Hongkongers. Many new localist labelled "Umbrella groups" were formed after the protest. notably Youngspiration and Hong Kong Indigenous. Youngspiration took part in the 2015 District Council election with many other newcoming "Umbrella soldiers" and eventually won one seat out of nine candidates. Hong Kong Indigenous is notable for its protest style, in which it calls for a "militant" approach with "some kind of clash", as opposed to pan-democrats' "gentle approach" of non-violent civil disobedience.

There were also disaffection toward the Hong Kong Federation of Students (HKFS), the leading figure in the protests, resulted in a great split in the student federation. The localists launched a campaign quitting the HKFS. By the end of 2015, four of the eight student unions consisting the federation, the Hong Kong University Students' Union (HKUSU), the Hong Kong Polytechnic University Students' Union (HKPUSU), the Hong Kong Baptist University Students' Union (HKBUSU) and the City University of Hong Kong Students' Union (CityUSU), broke up with the HKFS.

The Legislative Council by-election in New Territories East on 28 February 2016 was a milestone of the localist movements, as it was the first attempt for them to contest for the Legislative Council under localist banner. Edward Leung of Hong Kong Indigenous received a better-than expected result in the New Territories East by-election in February 2016 by taking more than 66,000 votes and gaining about 15 percent of the total votes. After the election, Leung claimed localism had gained a foothold as the third most important power in local politics, standing side by side with the pan-democracy and pro-Beijing camps.

=== 2016 Legislative Council election ===
A day after the 2016 New Territories East by-election, three localist groups, Wong Yuk-man's Proletariat Political Institute, Wong Yeung-tat's Civic Passion and Chin Wan's Hong Kong Resurgence Order, announced to run in the September Legislative Council election under the alliance "CP–PPI–HKRO". On 10 April 2016. six localist groups Youngspiration, Kowloon East Community, Tin Shui Wai New Force, Cheung Sha Wan Community Establishment Power, Tsz Wan Shan Constructive Power and Tuen Mun Community, formed an electoral alliance under the name "ALLinHK" planned to field candidates in four of the five geographical constituencies with the agenda to put forward a referendum on Hong Kong's self-determination, while Hong Kong Indigenous and another new pro-independence Hong Kong National Party also stated that they will run in the upcoming election. Demosisto, a left-leaning political party formed by Umbrella Revolution leaders Joshua Wong, Oscar Lai of the Scholarism and Nathan Law of the Hong Kong Federation of Students was also formed on the same day. The political party aimed to field candidates in the upcoming election with the platform of "self-determination" of Hong Kong future. It allied with veteran activist Eddie Chu who rose to fame in the 2006 Edinburgh Place Ferry Pier protest and university lecturer Lau Siu-lai who held class in the occupation sites in the 2014 occupy protest.

On 14 July 2016, the Electoral Affairs Commission (EAC) announced its plan to require all candidates to sign an additional "confirmation form" in the nomination to declare their understanding of Hong Kong being an inalienable part of China as stipulated in the Basic Law, in response to many potential localist candidates advocating or promoting Hong Kong independence. After the end of the nomination period, six localist candidates received emails from the EAC which said their nominations were "invalidated". New Territories East constituency returning officer Cora Ho Lai-sheung rejected Leung's nomination on the basis that she did not trust Leung "genuinely changed his previous stance for independence."

The localists scored a great victory in the election, winning six seats (excluding Claudia Mo) and securing of 19 per cent of the vote share (excluding Claudia Mo and Gary Fan). Occupy student leader Nathan Law of the Demosisto became the youngest ever candidate to be elected, Polytechnic University lecturer Lau Siu-lai and Eddie Chu, were returned in the geographical constituencies.

=== Oath-taking controversy and disqualification ===
On 12 October 2016, at the inaugural meeting of the Legislative Council, two Youngspiration legislators, Baggio Leung and Yau Wai-ching, took the oaths of office as the opportunity to make their pro-independence statement. The two first claimed that "As a member of the Legislative Council, I shall pay earnest efforts in keeping guard over the interests of the Hong Kong nation," displayed a "Hong Kong is not China" banner, inserted their own words into the oaths and mispronounced "People's Republic of China" as "people's re-fucking of Chee-na". Their oaths were invalidated by the Legislative Council secretary-general Kenneth Chen and were subsequently challenged by the government in the court. On 7 November 2016, the National People's Congress Standing Committee (NPCSC) interpreted the Article 104 of the Basic Law of Hong Kong to "clarify" the provision of the legislators to swear allegiance to Hong Kong as part of China when they take office. The spokesman of the Hong Kong and Macau Affairs Office stated that "[Beijing] will absolutely neither permit anyone advocating secession in Hong Kong nor allow any pro-independence activists to enter a government institution." As a consequence, the court disqualified the two legislators on 15 November.

== Factions ==
Despite the controversies over "who are localists?" due to the vague concept of localism and the vague platforms of the localist camp, the localist camp can be loosely categorised into the following factions:

- Against Mainlandisation – rejects influx of mainland culture, immigrants and Communist oppression on Hong Kong people's civil liberties and ways of life.
  - Represented party and MPs – HK First (Claudia Mo, Gary Fan), a moderate parliamentary faction, categorised into the pan-democracy camp due to their background although carrying a localist agenda.
- Democratic self-determination – rooted from the social activism and student movements within the pro-democracy camp. They formed the Local Action during the post-80s conservation movements in the late 2000s which rose to its peak in the anti-Express Rail Link protest. They generally hold a more liberal agenda, supporting universal retirement protection scheme and sympathising with the new immigrants. On the autonomy of Hong Kong, they advocate for "democratic self-determination", contrasting the radical localists' notion of "national self-determination". They usually have warmer relationship with the pan-democrats.
  - Represented party and MPs – Land Justice League (Eddie Chu), positioned as the progressive wing of the pro-democracy camp after the oath-taking controversy; Demosisto (Nathan Law), formed in 2016, was led by the student leaders from the two leading groups in the 2014 Hong Kong protests, the Hong Kong Federation of Students (HKFS) and Scholarism; Democracy Groundwork (Lau Siu-lai).
  - Advocating members – Alex Chow, Joshua Wong, Lester Shum, Gwyneth Ho, Sunny Cheung, Tiffany Yuen
- Hong Kong independence – a faction encompassing the political spectrum that strives for Hong Kong independence by both parliamentary and militant means. "Hong Kong independence, the only way out" has become a popular chant in the 2019 widespread protests.
  - Represented party – Hong Kong National Party; Hong Kong Independence Party; Studentlocalism.
  - Advocating members – Student leaders and academics including Paladin Cheng, Billy Fung, Lam Wing-kee, Joe Chung
- National self-determination – emerged from the Umbrella Revolution among other "post-Umbrella organisations" and participated in several protests including the "anti-Siu Yau-wai protest". They advocate for a Hong Kong national identity and a national self-determination over the Hong Kong sovereignty and although do not officially support Hong Kong independence. They generally take the anti-immigration stance against the influx of mainland immigrants and tourists. They advocate for a more radical and "militant" approach and also "parliamentary path" under ALLinHK alliance.
  - Represented party and MPs – Youngspiration (Baggio Leung, Yau Wai-ching)
  - Ideological leader – Hong Kong Indigenous (Edward Leung, Ray Wong)
- Restoration of the British rule – calls for the restoration of the British rule.
  - Represented party – Conservative Party; Alliance of Resuming British Sovereignty over Hong Kong and Independence, second political group to advocate a breakaway from China established on 26 June 2016, aims to gain independence as the ultimate goal, but seeks to return to British rule as a transitional phase
  - Advocating members – Chip Tsao and others
- Sustaining of the Basic Law – takes "City-state theory" by Chin Wan which calls for a city-state status of Hong Kong through the amendment of the Hong Kong Basic Law mandated by all citizens through a de facto referendum. After the amendment was accepted by the Chinese Communist Party, the autonomy of Hong Kong would be guaranteed even after the original deadline of 2047. They advocated for a "militant" protest style and are hostile toward the pan-democrats and the moderate localists, opposed the leadership of the pan-democrat-friendly Occupy Central trio and moderate activist groups Scholarism and HKFS. After the electoral defeat of the CP–PPI–HKRO alliance, the platform was announced to be dropped.
  - Represented party and MPs – Civic Passion (Cheng Chung-tai); Proletariat Political Institute (Wong Yuk-man)
  - Ideological leader – Hong Kong Resurgence Order (Chin Wan, author of On the Hong Kong City-State and "City-state theory")

== Electoral performance ==
=== Legislative Council elections ===
Election	Number of popular votes	% of popular votes	GC seats	FC seats	EC seats	Total seats	+/−
2016	411,893	19.00	6	0	—N/a	6 / 70	5▲
2021	did not contest		0	0	0	0 / 90	6▼

=== District Council elections ===
Election	Number of popular votes	% of popular votes	Total seats	+/−
2015	44,334	3.07	6 / 458	6▲
2019			126 / 479	120▲

== See also ==
- Pan-Green Coalition (Taiwan)
- Pro-Beijing camp (Hong Kong)
- Hong Kong Autonomy Movement
- Localism in Hong Kong
