= Proletariat Political Institute =

Proletariat Political Institute 普羅政治學苑
- Chairman: Wong Yuk-man
- Founded: 28 June 2010
- Headquarters: Rm. 418, Wah Wai Industrial Building, No. 53-61 Pak Tin Par Street, Tsuen Wan, New Territories, Hong Kong
- Ideology: Direct democracy Hong Kong localism Radical democracy
- Colours: Yellow
- Legislative Council: 0 / 90
- District Councils: 0 / 470

Website
- www.hkppi.com

Proletariat Political Institute
- Traditional Chinese: 普羅政治學苑
- Simplified Chinese: 普罗政治学苑
Transcriptions
Standard Mandarin
- Hanyu Pinyin: Pǔluó Zhèngzhìxué Yuàn
Yue: Cantonese
- Yale Romanization: Póu lòh jing jih hohk yún
- Jyutping: Pou2 lo4 zing3 zi6 hok6 jyun2

Proletariat Political Institute is a political organisation and school headed by Wong Yuk-man, former member of the Legislative Council of Hong Kong. It was first established by Wong in 2010 as a political educational institute within the League of Social Democrats (LSD), a pro-democratic social democratic party where Wong was the then chairman. It quit the LSD under Wong's leadership and became one of the coalition members of the radical democratic party People Power in 2011. It left the People Power in 2013 and became one of the leading organisations for the localist cause in Hong Kong.

== History ==
Proletariat Political Institute was first created in 2010 as a political school of the League of Social Democrats, a pro-democratic social democratic party where Wong was the then chairman. It aimed to train young members on political theory, speech making, district work, and public policy research for nurturing the vision for youth.

Proletariat Political Institute quit the LSD when Wong and another legislator Albert Chan Wai-yip split with the LSD in 2011, due to their dissatisfaction with the policies of the then chairman Andrew To Kwan-hang and his faction, especially To's decision not to spin the Democratic Party, the flagship pro-democratic party, which negotiated with the Beijing government in secret and supported the government's reform proposal.

It became one of the coalition members of People Power with Power Voters, supported by Stephen Shiu Yeuk-yuen, the owner of the Hong Kong Reporter, the re-grouped Frontier, and the two pro-Taiwan organisations: China Youth Organization and Democratic Alliance when it was established in 2011. People Power fiercely attacked the Democratic Party in the 2011 District Council election and 2012 Legislative Council election.

The Proletariat Political Institute went independent with Wong Yuk-man when Wong quit People Power in 2013 over the disagreement regarding the 2014 Hong Kong electoral reform and the pan-democrats' Occupy Central plan. Wong expressed doubts over the plan while Stephen Shiu, the main donor of People Power, supported the plan. Shiu also attacked Wong Yeung-tat, Wong Yuk-man's protege, for his opportunism. Since then, Wong Yuk-man's Proletariat Political Institute has become close to Wong Yeung-tat's Civic Passion.

Since 2013, the Proletariat Political Institute has become more sympathetic towards the localist cause. It organised memorials for the Tiananmen Square protests of 1989, in opposition to the main candlelight vigil held by the pan-democrats' Hong Kong Alliance in Support of Patriotic Democratic Movements in China (HKASPDMC), which they criticised it for having a Chinese nationalistic theme. The Proletariat Political Institute, Civic Passion, and other localist groups organised an alternative 4 June rally in Tsim Sha Tsui. The alternative event attracted 200 people in 2013 and 7,000 in 2014, compared with 180,000 and 150,000 respectively for the main event.

In 2016, the Proletariat Political Institute, Civic Passion, and Hong Kong Resurgence Order, headed by the "mentor" of the localism Chin Wan, announced that they would form an alliance for the upcoming 2016 Legislative Council election. Its chairman and only LegCo representative, Wong Yuk-man, was defeated by a narrow margin by another localist, Youngspiration's Yau Wai-ching.

== Performance in elections ==
=== Legislative Council elections ===
Election	Number of popular votes	% of popular votes	GC seats	FC seats	Total seats	+/−	Position
2016	20,219	0.93	0	0	0 / 70	1▼	–

== See also ==
- Civic Passion
- Hong Kong Resurgence Order
