= Civic Passion =

Civic Passion 熱血公民
- Chairman: Cheng Chung-tai
- Founded: 29 February 2012
- Dissolved: 3 September 2021
- Headquarters: Yuen Long, Hong Kong
- Newspaper: Passion Times
- Ideology: Localism (HK); Hong Kong nationalism
- Political position: Right-wing
- Colours: Yellow

Website
- civicpassion.hk (defunct)

Civic Passion
- Traditional Chinese: 熱血公民
- Simplified Chinese: 热血公民
- Literal meaning: hot-blooded (passionate) citizens
Transcriptions
Standard Mandarin
- Hanyu Pinyin: Rèxuè gōngmín
Yue: Cantonese
- Yale Romanization: Yiht hyut gūng màhn
- Jyutping: Jit^{6} hyut^{3} gung^{1} man^{4}

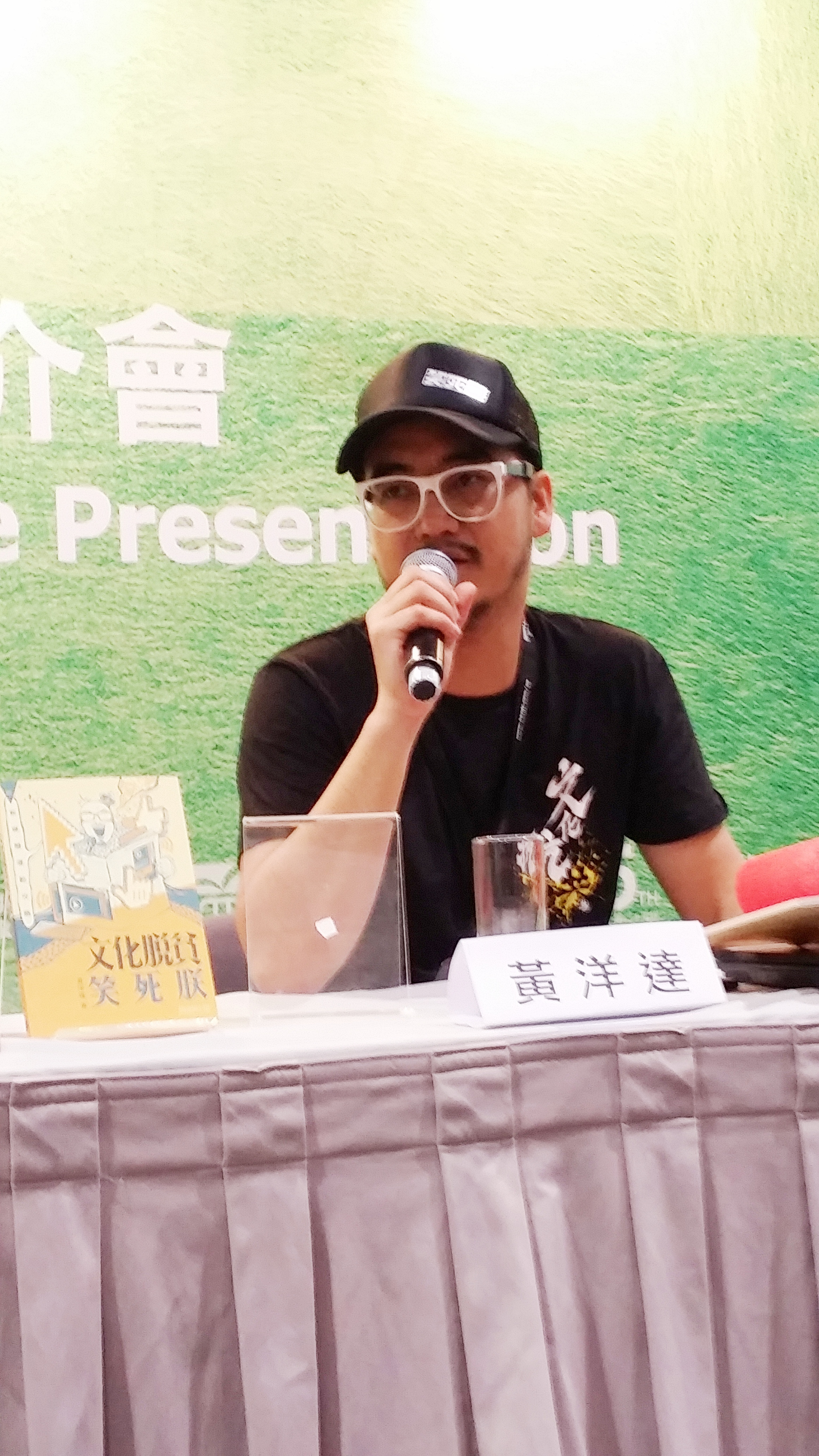
Civic Passion founder Wong Yeung-tat.

Civic Passion was a radical, populist, localist, and nativist political party in Hong Kong. Founded by Wong Yeung-tat as an activist group in 2012, it held strong localist views and opposed the involvement of the Chinese government in the governance of Hong Kong. In the 2016 Legislative Council election, the Civic Passion formed an electoral alliance with Wong Yuk-man's Proletariat Political Institute and Chin Wan's Hong Kong Resurgence Order. Cheng Chung-tai became the only candidate of the alliance elected to the legislature and subsequently took over as the leader of the Civic Passion. After the election, Cheng reorganised the group into a political party and pulled out from the social activism. From December 2020 to August 2021, it was the only opposition party in the Legislative Council of Hong Kong.

== History ==
=== Founding ===
Former logo of Civic Passion.

The group was founded on 29 February 2012 by Wong Yeung-tat. Wong Yeung-tat was a candidate for the electoral alliance People Power (a radical democratic political party) during the 2012 Legislative Council election in Kowloon East constituency and Civic Passion served as the election campaign vehicle for Wong. After losing the election, Wong denied any relationship with People Power and Civic Passion became non-affiliated with any group.

As an internet activist group, it runs Passion Times (Chinese: 熱血時報), an organisation that publishes printed materials and broadcast internet radio programmes and which has over 300,000 Facebook followers. The group's app was banned in China's Apple App store during the 2014 Hong Kong protests. During the protests, its website suffered distributed denial-of-service (DDoS) attacks, during which Passion Times claims its website was hit with up to 200,000,000 requests per second.

=== Activism and Umbrella Movement ===
Civic Passion takes a radical view towards the Central People's Government of the People's Republic of China and against the large influx of mainland tourists and new immigrants to Hong Kong. Due to these anti-mainland sentiments, the group has been accused of xenophobia, nativism and advocacy of Hong Kong independence by the pro-Beijing camp and even by mainstream democrats.

Civic Passion criticises the moderate pan-democracy camp for their stance on immigration policy and border control and their relationship with Beijing. In 2013 and 2014, the group organised an alternative 4 June rally in Tsim Sha Tsui against the annual vigil to commemorate the Tiananmen Square crackdown held by the Hong Kong Alliance in Support of Patriotic Democratic Movements in China of the pan-democracy camp as they accused it of being under the theme of Chinese nationalistic sentiment. The alternative event attracted 200 people in 2013 and 7,000 in 2014, compared with 180,000 and 150,000 respectively for the Victoria Park event.

During the 2014 Hong Kong protests, Civic Passion was one of the constituent groups of the Umbrella Movement. One of its activists, nicknamed "Frenchman", allegedly instigated the forced entry into the Legislative Council Complex, in which masked raiders rammed glass doors and dispersed promptly after two panes of the glass door were broken. Wong Yeung-tat denied claims that he instigated or planned the incident. The group also allegedly tried to gain control of the main stage of the Admiralty site and confronted the campaign leadership after the pan-democrats condemned the attack on the LegCo building.

In early 2015, it organised anti-parallel trading protests with another localist group Hong Kong Indigenous against the growing influx of mainland Chinese shoppers engaging in parallel trading in early 2015, aggressively picketing the alleged shoppers and having clashes with the police. After the third demonstration, the central government said it would restrict Shenzhen residents to one visit a week.

In May 2016 Civic passion announced the creation of a summer camp program which would feature “military style training” and “lectures on localism”. Wong Yeung-tat dismissed claims by critics that the program was designed to instil a radical localist ideology, and instead likened the program to the Hong Kong Army Cadets Association Limited led by Regina Leung, the wife of Chief Executive Leung Chun-ying.

=== 2015–2016 elections ===
In the 2015 District Council election, Civic Passion fielded six candidates, of which five ran against the pro-democratic Democratic Party, but did not win any seat. However, Democrat heavyweight Albert Ho lost his seat in Lok Tsui to pro-Beijing lawyer Junius Ho with a margin of 125 votes while Civic Passion candidate Cheng Chung-tai took 391 votes.

In the 2016 Legislative Council election, Civic Passion formed an electoral alliance with Proletariat Political Institute's Wong Yuk-man and Hong Kong Resurgence Order's Chin Wan. The electoral alliance set their platform Chin's "City-state theory", amending the current Basic Law of Hong Kong to maintain the Hong Kong's "city-state" status with the means of a de facto referendum triggered by all five legislators of the alliance resigning from each geographical constituencies. The alliance ultimately lost as only one of their candidates Cheng Chung-tai in New Territories West won a seat. The alliance bagged 154,176 votes, 7.11 per cent of the vote share. Wong Yeung-tat resigned from the leadership and was replaced by Cheng after the election.

After the election, Wong Yeung-tat resigned as the leader of Civic Passion and subsequently quit the group with his Passion Times. Cheng took over as leader and transformed the group into a political party in which he became the chairman and Alvin Cheng as vice-chairman. Cheng vowed to switch the party from "militant" street action to parliamentary path with community groundwork and pulled out from social activism entirely.

=== Parliament and disbandment ===
Cheng Chung-tai did not join the pro-democracy camp along with other anti-establishment colleagues after being elected to the Legislative Council. Cheng later became the only localist member in the parliament after the disqualification of members in the oath-taking controversy.

After protest erupted in mid-2019, the rift between Civic Passion and pro-democracy bloc still existed, as shown in House Committee brawl and National Anthem Bill debates. In November 2020, 4 pro-democracy Legislative Council members were disqualified by Hong Kong Government in accordance with the decision from Beijing. All pro-democracy legislators resigned to protest against the "unlawful" act, but Cheng and unaligned Pierre Chan announced their decision to stay, intensifying the disagreement between two sides.

Cheng Chung-tai was disqualified as Legislative Council member on 26 August 2021 after authorities deemed him as unpatriotic. Civic Passion, which he chaired, announced to disband on 3 September, citing no future political pathway ahead. Two district councillors from the party resigned on the same day.

== Leadership ==
=== Leader ===
- Wong Yeung-tat, 2012–2016

=== Chairman ===
- Cheng Chung-tai, 2016–2021

=== Vice-Chairman ===
- Alvin Cheng, 2016–2020
- Wong Siu-kin, 2021–2021

== Performance in elections ==
=== Legislative Council elections ===
Election	Number of popular votes	% of popular votes	GC seats	FC seats	Total seats	+/−	Position
2016	122,140	5.63	1	0	1 / 70	1▲	10th▲

=== District Council elections ===
Election	Number of popular votes	% of popular votes	Total elected seats	+/−
2015	3,006	0.21	0 / 431	0
2019	14,326▲	0.49▲	2 / 452	2▲

== See also ==
- Internet activism
- Localism in Hong Kong
- Localist camp (Hong Kong)
- Hong Kong Autonomy Movement
- Proletariat Political Institute
