= Hong Kong Resurgence Order =

Honk Kong localist political organisation

Hong Kong Resurgence Order (Chinese: 香港復興會) is a localist political organisation in Hong Kong. It was founded by Chin Wan, the "mentor" of localism in Hong Kong and the founder of the city-state theory, in 2014 with a manifesto aiming to "restore the ancient Chinese civilisation".

The group previously announced a plan to contest in the 2016 Legislative Council election with Wong Yuk-man's Proletariat Political Institute and Wong Yeung-tat's Civic Passion.

== See also ==
- Hong Kong Autonomy Movement
- Civic Passion
- Proletariat Political Institute
