= Cheng Chung-tai =

Hong Kong academic and politician (born 1983)

- 鄭松泰
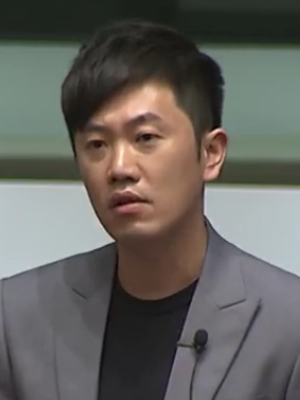
- Cheng in 2021

Member of the Legislative Council
- In office 1 October 2016 – 26 August 2021
- Preceded by: Albert Chan
- Succeeded by: Constituency abolished
- Constituency: New Territories West

Chairman of Civic Passion
- In office 5 September 2016 – 3 September 2021
- Preceded by: Wong Yeung-tat
- Succeeded by: Party dissolved

Personal details
- Born: 5 November 1983 (age 42) Hong Kong
- Party: Civic Passion
- Education: Hong Kong Polytechnic University (BA); Peking University (PhD)
- Occupation: Academic

Cheng Chung-tai
- Traditional Chinese: 鄭松泰
- Simplified Chinese: 郑松泰
Transcriptions
Standard Mandarin
- Hanyu Pinyin: Zhèng Sōngtài
Yue: Cantonese
- Yale Romanization: Jehng Chùhng taai
- Jyutping: Zeng^{6} Cung^{4}-taai^{3}

Cheng Chung-tai (Chinese: 鄭松泰; born 5 November 1983) is a Hong Kong academic, social activist, and politician. After winning a seat in the New Territories West constituency in the 2016 legislative election, he took over from Wong Yeung-tat as chairman of Civic Passion until the dissolution in 2021.

Before his disqualification in August 2021, he was the sole remaining opposition member in the Legislative Council after the mass resignation of pro-democracy legislators.

== Biography ==
Cheng was born in 1983 in Hong Kong. He obtained his bachelor's degree from Hong Kong Polytechnic University and doctoral degree from Peking University.

He was a member of the localist party Civic Passion and participated in the anti-parallel trading protests in 2015. In the 2015 local election, Cheng represented Civic Passion to run against pro-democratic Democratic Party incumbent Albert Ho in Lok Tsui, where he secured 391 votes, while Ho lost his seat to pro-Beijing candidate Junius Ho by a margin of 277 votes.

In the 2016 Hong Kong Legislative Council election, Cheng represented Civic Passion to run in the New Territories West. He took over Wong Yeung-tat's position as the leader of Civic Passion after his electoral victory.

On 5 January 2017, Cheng declared that Civic Passion would no longer participate in street protests and instead reorient itself to focusing on community work, and to restructure as a political party. As reasons for this step, he cited the risks – several Civic Passion members had been arrested for their involvement in the 2016 Mong Kok civil unrest almost a year earlier –, as well as his view that current public opinion was not supportive enough of street protests.

In September 2017, Cheng was convicted and fined for the offence of flag desecration. In October 2016, he had flipped upside down some miniature Chinese and Hong Kong flags, which legislator Edward Lau had handed out to legislators of the Legislative Council. Lau stated in his testimony that his intention had been to remind legislators that the country should be respected. Cheng regarded the flags as "cheap patriotic acts" and alleged that the pro-Beijing bloc was ignoring issues of actual importance to Hong Kong people. Lau subsequently called the police to report Cheng for flag desecration. On 29 September 2017, the Eastern Magistrates' Court found Cheng guilty and fined him HK$5,000. Lau subsequently stated that the punishment was light, and referred to previous sentences of imprisonment for burning and scrawling on the flag.

On 31 August 2019, Cheng was one of several prominent democrats targeted in sweeping arrests made by police that day.

In November 2020, pro-democracy Legislative Council members resigned en masse to protest against the latest action by the Chinese Government, leaving Cheng the sole opposition legislator; and along with nonpartisan Pierre Chan, one of the two non-pro-Beijing members.

Cheng lost his Legislative Council seat on 26 August 2021 after he was disqualified of his ex-officio membership in the Election Committee, which would be mandated to elect new Chief Executive, as the authorities deemed Cheng "unpatriotic".

== Academic career ==
From 2012 to 2018, Cheng has served as a teaching fellow at the Department of Applied Social Sciences at the Hong Kong Polytechnic University. He teaches classes on Hong Kong society, Chinese society, and popular culture.

In 2016, he was criticised by Kaizer Lau, a member of the governing council of the Hong Kong Polytechnic University for supporting and organising violent protests and advocating for Hong Kong independence. Lau also called for the non-renewal of the employment contract of Cheng.

Cheng lost this position on 30 June 2018 as his teaching contract had not been renewed by the university. He quoted a disciplinary letter from the university as stating: "Your conduct and convictions are inconsistent with the university's commitment to quality education and aspiration to embrace internationalisation". He alleged that the university's actions were "political persecution" and were unrelated to his teaching performance.

== See also ==
- Hong Kong Autonomy Movement

Legislative Council of Hong Kong
Preceded by Lee Cheuk-yan	Member of Legislative Council; Representative for New Territories West; 2016–2021	Constituency abolished
Party political offices
Preceded by Wong Yeung-tat as Leader of Civic Passion	Chairman of Civic Passion; 2016–2021	Party dissolved
Order of precedence
Preceded by Lau Kwok-fan; Member of the Legislative Council	Hong Kong order of precedence Member of the Legislative Council	Succeeded by Roy Kwong; Member of the Legislative Council
