= Wong Yeung-tat =

Hong Kong social activist (born 1979)

- 黃洋達
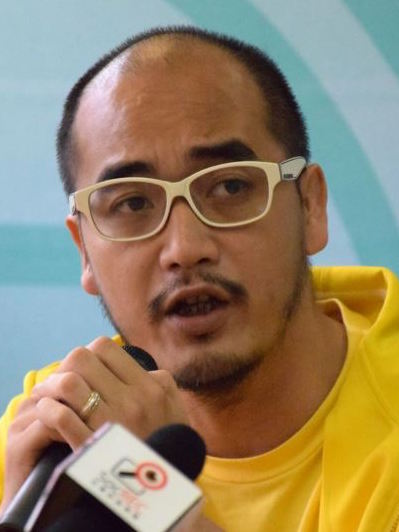

Leader of Civic Passion
- In office 29 February 2012 – 5 September 2016
- Succeeded by: Cheng Chung-tai

Personal details
- Born: 29 May 1979 (age 47) Hong Kong
- Party: Civic Passion (2012–16)
- Spouse: Chan Sau-wai
- Education: Hong Kong Baptist University
- Occupation: Social activist, screenwriter, novelist, internet radio host

Wong Yeung-tat
- Traditional Chinese: 黃洋達
Transcriptions
Yue: Cantonese
- Yale Romanization: Wòhng Yèuhng daaht
- Jyutping: Wong^{4} Joeng^{4} daat^{6}

Wong Yeung-tat (Chinese: 黃洋達; born 29 May 1979) is a Hong Kong social activist and the founder and former leader of radical populist group Civic Passion.

== Biography ==
Wong was born in Hong Kong and graduated from Hong Kong Baptist University. He joined Television Broadcasts Limited (TVB) and became a screenwriter. He later quit TVB and started his career as a novelist in 2004.

Wong became active in politics in 2010 when he began to host online radio shows for Hong Kong Reporter, an internet radio station affiliated with the democratic party People Power. He quickly rose as the protege of democrat legislator Raymond Wong Yuk-man.

In February 2012, Wong helped found activist group, Civic Passion. The group grew out of dissent with the course that the moderates in the pro-democracy camp had taken. In October 2012, Civic Passion launched Passion Times, a free-of-charge hard-copy newspaper distributed in MTR stations. In November 2012, Passion Times started a radio station, which went on to play an important role in attracting further supporters for Civic Passion, and other cultural products including comics and novels.

Wong ran for the Legislative Council in the 2012 LegCo election as a People Power candidate. Before he ran for the election, he took the initiative to waive bail and serve his sentence for his conviction of gate-crashing a public forum at the Hong Kong Science Museum protesting against a government proposal of the Legislative Council (Amendment) Bill 2012 in September 2011, as he would not have been eligible for candidacy if his prison term had still been pending. After he served his three-week sentence, he ran for the election but failed in Kowloon East by 2,900 votes.

On 11 December 2014, Wong was arrested at his home on suspicion of multiple counts of unauthorized assembly, according to his wife Chan Sau-wai. Wong had been active at the protest site in Mong Kok during the 2014 Hong Kong Protests. The Civic Passion group had made the Mong Kok base their stronghold as the protests began to be showing signs of internal dissent, advocating for escalation, with Wong comparing mainland immigration to a "colonization of Hong Kong".

In September 2016, Wong resigned as the leader of Civic Passion, saying that he did so out of taking responsibility for the failure of the election alliance that Civic Passion had formed with the Proletariat Political Institute and Hong Kong Resurgence Order for the 2016 Legislative Council election. At that election, Wong's mentor Raymond Wong Yuk-man had narrowly lost to Youngspiration's Yau Wai-ching, an outcome about which the latter expressed her disappointment. Wong continued to run Passion Times independently.

== Filmography ==
Assistant Director:

- Gimme Gimme
- Love au Zen

Story:

- 72 Tenants of Prosperity
- I Love Hong Kong
- The Fortune Buddies
- I Love Hong Kong 2012

Actor:

- Forever and Ever ... Patient

Writer:

- Killer 2
- Unplugging Nightmare
- Turning Point
- 72 Tenants of Prosperity
- I Love Hong Kong
- The Fortune Buddies

== See also ==
- Localist camp
- Hong Kong Autonomy Movement

Party political offices
New title	Leader of Civic Passion; 2012–2016	Succeeded by Cheng Chung-tai
