= Individual Visit Scheme =

Individual visas for visiting Hong Kong and Macau

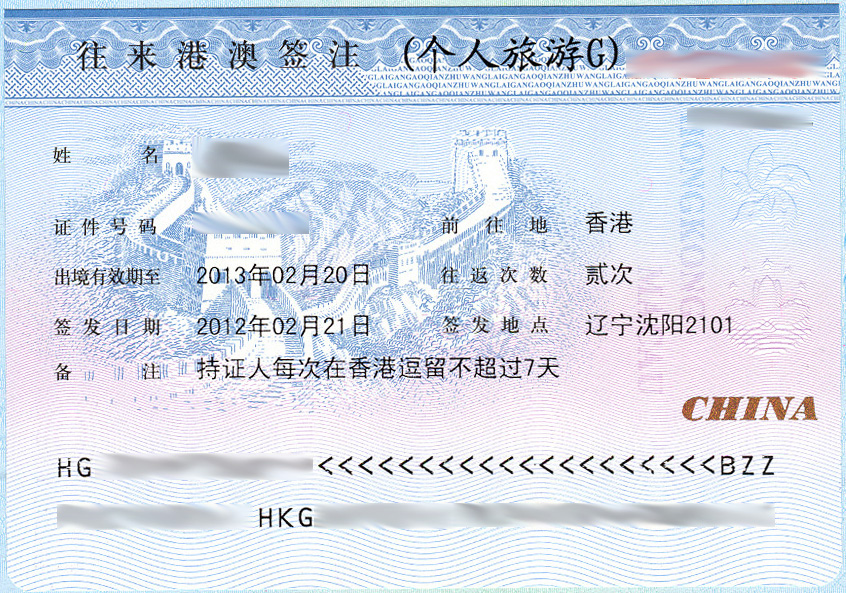
- The Hong Kong Individual Visit Permit issued by People's Republic of China on a Chinese Two-way Permit for Hong Kong and Macau.
- Traditional Chinese: 自由行
- Simplified Chinese: 自由行
- Hanyu Pinyin: zì yóu xíng
- Literal meaning: free walking
Transcriptions
Standard Mandarin
- Hanyu Pinyin: zì yóu xíng
Yue: Cantonese
- Jyutping: zi6 jau4 heng4
- IPA: [tɕìː jɐ̏u hɛ̏ːŋ]

The Individual Visit Scheme (Chinese: 自由行, Portuguese: Visto Individual) began on 28 July 2003 allowing travelers from Mainland China to visit Hong Kong and Macau on an individual basis; prior to the Scheme, Mainland residents could only visit on business visas or on group tours.

The Scheme was launched to boost the economy of Hong Kong and Macau. Initially, residents of Beijing, Shanghai, and 8 cities in Guangdong (Dongguan, Foshan, Guangzhou, Huizhou, Jiangmen, Shenzhen, Zhongshan and Zhuhai) could apply for visas to visit Hong Kong and Macau individually. The scheme was extended to all 21 cities of Guangdong province in July 2004, and to 9 other cities in Jiangsu, Zhejiang, and Fujian provinces in July 2004.

The visas, issued by the Public Security Bureau of the People's Republic of China, were valid for 7 days and could be renewed upon return from Hong Kong to the Mainland.

The scheme brought an immediate surge in the number of Mainland visitors. In the short period between 28 July and 4 November 2003, more than 600,000 individuals on the Mainland applied for visas and 450,000 visas were issued. The number of visitors under the scheme reached two million by May 2004.

== Development ==
The Individual Visit Scheme allows select tourists from designated cities and provinces in mainland China to visit Hong Kong and Macau by using individual visas (as opposed the needing to travel as part of a government-approved tour group).

Initially, the Individual Visit Scheme was only open to residents of Beijing, Shanghai, and eight cities in Guangdong province. China's central government expanded the program once it was shown to be successful. As of 2023, the Individual Visa Scheme is open to residents of 49 Chinese cities.

== Social impact ==
The establishment of the Individual Visa Scheme resulted in a surge of tourism to Macau.

== Timetable of implementation ==
- 28 July 2003: Dongguan, Foshan, Zhongshan, Jiangmen
- 20 August 2003: Guangzhou, Shenzhen, Zhuhai, Huizhou
- 1 September 2003: Shanghai, Beijing
- 1 January 2004: Shantou, Chaozhou, Meizhou, Zhaoqing, Qingyuan, Yunfu
- 1 May 2004: Shanwei, Maoming, Zhanjiang, Shaoguan, Jieyang, Heyuan, Yangjiang (That covered the whole Guangdong province.)
- 1 July 2004: Nanjing, Suzhou, Wuxi, Hangzhou, Ningbo, Taizhou, Fuzhou (urban area only), Xiamen, Quanzhou
- 1 March 2005: Tianjin, Chongqing (15 districts and counties only)
- 1 November 2005: Chengdu, Jinan, Dalian, Shenyang
- 1 May 2006: Nanchang, Changsha, Nanning, Haikou, Guiyang, Kunming
- 1 January 2007: Shijiazhuang, Zhengzhou, Changchun, Hefei, Wuhan
- 6 March 2024: Qingdao, Xi'an
- 27 May 2024: Taiyuan, Hohhot, Harbin, Lhasa, Lanzhou, Xining, Yinchuan, Urumqi

== Macau visa restrictions ==
- April 2007: 2 visits per month.
- May 2008: 1 visit per month.
- July 2008: 1 visit per two months.
- August 2008: travellers through Macao to another destination in China are only allowed to stay in Macao for 7 days vs. prior 14 days.
- September 2008: eliminated a loophole that allowed Chinese residents to travel to Macao using a Hong Kong visa.
- October 2008: 1 visit per three months.

== See also ==
- Tourism in Hong Kong
