= Wong Yuk-man =

Hong Kong politician (born 1951)

- 黃毓民
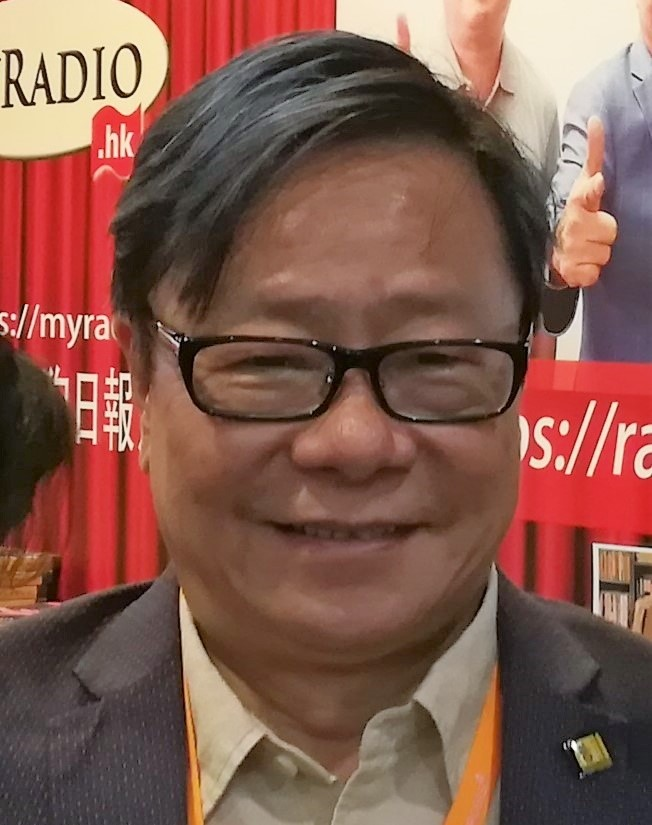
- Wong attending the Hong Kong Book Fair 2018 at the Hong Kong Convention and Exhibition Centre on 20 July 2018

Member of the Legislative Council
- In office 1 October 2008 – 30 September 2016
- Constituency: Kowloon West

Chairman of the League of Social Democrats
- In office 1 October 2006 – 31 January 2010
- Succeeded by: Andrew To

Personal details
- Born: 1 October 1951 (age 74) British Hong Kong
- Party: Proletariat Political Institute
- Other political affiliations: Kuomintang; Hong Kong and Macau Branch (until 1996); League of Social Democrats (2006–2011); People Power (2011–2013)
- Children: 3 sons (Wong Tak-hon, eldest)
- Occupation: Politician, professor, current affairs commentator, radio host, published author, actor (formerly)
- Profession: Legislative Councillor

Wong Yuk-man
- Traditional Chinese: 黃毓民
- Simplified Chinese: 黄毓民
Transcriptions
Standard Mandarin
- Hanyu Pinyin: Huáng Yùmín
Yue: Cantonese
- Yale Romanization: Wòhng Yūkmàhn
- Jyutping: Wong^{4} Juk^{1}man^{4}

Raymond Wong Yuk-man (Chinese: 黃毓民; born 1 October 1951) is a Hong Kong author, current affairs commentator and radio host. He is a former member of the Legislative Council of Hong Kong (LegCo), representing the geographical constituency of Kowloon West. He worked in Commercial Radio Hong Kong and hosted many popular phone-in programmes. He is a founder and chairman of Mad Dog Daily from 1996 until its closure in 2022.

He was the head of Department in the Faculty of Communication and Journalism of Chu Hai College in Tsuen Wan, Hong Kong, from which he also holds a Master's degree in history. He is a populist and a former chairman of the League of Social Democrats (LSD). He is known for his outspoken manner, harsh criticism of the Chinese Government, and ferocious speeches in defence of the rights of the lower classes; consequently, he has been given the nicknames Mad Dog (癲狗) and "Rogue Professor" (流氓教授). He currently hosts "Wong Yuk-man Channel," a popular radio programme on MyRadio, which is a Hong Kong–based internet radio station founded in 2007, and as well as Proletariat Political Institute.

== Early life, publishing venture and talk shows ==
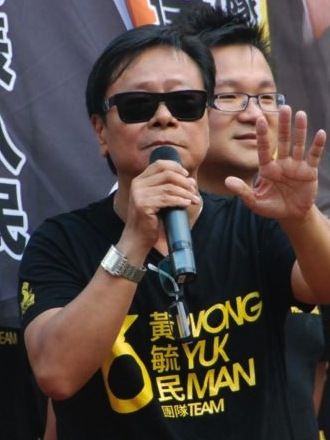
Wong at the 2012 LegCo Election, as a People Power Candidate

Wong was born on 1 October 1951 in British Hong Kong with family roots in Lufeng, Guangdong. Wong's father was a close friend of Heung Chin, a general of Nationalist Party of China and founder of the Sun Yee On, one of the leading triads in Hong Kong. He was under the patronage of the Heung family and was sent abroad to study in Taiwan. After he graduated from the Taiwan-affiliated Chu Hai College with a master's degree in history, Wong worked as a journalist and taught at Chu Hai College.

He first made his name in the early 1990s when he co-hosted Asia Television's controversial and hugely popular political commentary programme News Tease. He savaged pro-Beijing politicians until the show was axed after 64 episodes in 1994, allegedly under pressure from the mainland authorities.

In 1990, Wong used his entire savings – HK$500,000 – to launch News File magazine, but it closed down within two years and left him heavily in debt. On 18 March 1996, he established Mad Dog Daily, a tabloid with a clear "Anti-communism" and "Anti-Tung" stance. However, the paper suffered from a low sales volume, which Wong jokingly blamed on its "journalistic integrity" and refusal to participate in sensationalist journalism. After the 1997 Asian financial crisis, it transformed into a magazine in October 1997, and then was suspended shortly afterwards. As a result, Wong had to bear debts that amounted to a total of 15 million HKD. He repaid this debt in a matter of years by working on talk shows and other TV programmes.

In 2000, Wong established "CyberHK", an IT company that was also unsuccessful, falling victim to the dot-com bubble of 2001 and putting Wong into debt again. To settle the debts, Wong concentrated on his radio talk shows, writing articles for newspapers, and running his beef noodle restaurant. His popularity hit a peak by hosting two weekly shows for Commercial Radio Hong Kong; had three weekly slots on Radio Television Hong Kong, both on television and radio; and appeared on prime-time TV at least once a week.

In 2003, Wong converted to Christianity during the SARS epidemic in Hong Kong. He was attracted to liberation theology after his contact with the least-privileged in society during the crisis. He was active in mobilising support for the Hong Kong 1 July marches.

In 2004, he took a sabbatical from his talk show "Close Encounters of a Political Kind", after being beaten up by gangsters allegedly paid by the Chinese Government, citing "political pressure". Following a self-imposed three-month exile in Canada, he returned to Hong Kong where he was sacked from his weeknight political phone-in radio programme, and moved to a late Saturday night slot (with significantly fewer listeners). In less than a year, the programme was cancelled and Wong was effectively and controversially taken off-air. This event was significant for Hong Kong as it meant that there was no longer any outspoken and critical radio talk show host on any Hong Kong radio station. During his time off-air, he continued to run his beef noodle restaurant in Mongkok.

== Political career ==
=== Founding of League of Social Democrats ===
In 2006, he co-founded the League of Social Democrats, a self-described social democratic political party which aimed to be a "clear-cut opposition party" and defend the interests of the grassroots. In 2007, he made a comeback to phone-in radio talk show, hosting a weekly political radio programme "Wong Yuk-man Channel" on MyRadio. The show quickly gained popularity and some videos of his broadcasts – captured by a studio camera and uploaded to YouTube – have become some of the most-watched videos in Hong Kong. "Wong Yuk-man Channel" has subsequently become a twice-weekly radio programme, now extended from one hour to 1½ hours. In 2008, he was appointed a trustee of the Chinese University of Hong Kong.

Wong Yuk-man refused to co-operate with the other pan-democratic parties Democratic Party and the Civic Party and strongly criticised the two parties for nominating Alan Leong as Chief Executive candidate in the 2007 election, saying that they are not qualified as democrats. In the 2008 Hong Kong Legislative election, he ran in the Kowloon West constituency on a platform of "Without struggle there is no change". During the campaign he lambasted the Civic Party's Claudia Mo Man-ching in the same way he did the candidates from the pro-Beijing, pro-government flagship party, the Democratic Alliance for the Betterment and Progress of Hong Kong (DAB), accusing the Civic Party of applying double standards in its fight for democracy, and being elitist. Wong ultimately gained a seat in the Legislative Council with the second highest number of votes in his constituency. while Mo lost in the election.

=== Legislative Council ===
==== Banana throwing incident ====
Wong Yuk-man introduced a number of innovative actions to Hong Kong politics. On 15 October 2008, during Hong Kong Chief Executive Donald Tsang's delivery of the Annual Policy Address, Wong and his colleagues Leung Kwok-hung and Albert Chan interrupted Tsang's speech and heckled. Tsang suggested that the HK$625 a month (US$80) Old Age Allowance paid to all senior citizens aged 65 or above be raised to HK$1000 a month (US$130), but with a means test introduced. Wong believed that this turned what was a gesture of respect to elderly people into welfare and was disrespectful to old people. Wong interrupted Tsang's speech and threw a bunch of bananas at him. The three LSD members were ejected from the chamber for the act.

The incident triggered much debate amongst scholars, commentators, fellow politicians, and the general public. The reception has been mixed with even some pro-democratic politicians condemning the attack. One of the most prominent figures in the pro-democratic camp, Anson Chan, released a formal statement criticising the stunt. On the other hand, the elderly of Hong Kong poured onto the streets in a demonstration of mass support for Wong; some even urged him to do it again. Wong himself has claimed that this controversial move had been successful in raising awareness about the discussion of benefits for the elderly. Indeed, within a week the government raised the fruit money to HK$1000 a month and dropped the proposal for means testing.

==== 2009 Budget Report ====
Wong caused another uproar when he attempted to snatch the 2009–10 Budget Report midway through reading by the Financial Secretary John Tsang Jun-Wah, saying that it did not address any policies to help lower class and lower middle class citizens during the 2008 financial crisis. Some LegCo members, including several members of the Democratic Party, and the pro-Beijing]] media together denounced Wong's actions as violent. Wong, however, stated that he did not cause any physical harm to anyone, nor was it his intention to do so. Demonstrators took to the streets in support of Wong and his actions.

Despite criticism, Wong commented that, in contrast to past attitudes, Hong Kong society was conservative and many people did not understand or appreciate his actions. Yet he continued to gain support from a niche of the local population, especially those from the grass-roots, for his relatively radical approach.

=== "Five Constituencies Referendum" and the People Power ===
In late-2009 and early 2010, a debate ensued amidst the pro-democracy camp on a more radical approach towards gaining universal suffrage. An agreement was reached between the Civic Party and Wong's League of Social Democrats for five members of their representation in the Legislative Council to resign and participate in a by-election, to create a referendum on the implementation of universal suffrage by 2012. In January 2010, Wong, another four lawmakers, Albert Chan, Tanya Chan, Leung Kwok-hung and Alan Leong resigned and participated in the ensuing by-election. On 16 May 2010, he was re-elected as a lawmaker in the by-election. The turn-out was only 17.7 percent of registered voters. Wong Yuk-man denounced the Democratic Party for negotiating with Beijing and voting for the reform package which he saw as "selling out democracy" and defecting to the Chinese Communist Party. LSD protesters attacked the Democratic Party in the following 2010 July 1 march.

In January 2010, Wong stepped down as Chairman of the LSD, handing the chairmanship to Andrew To Kwan-hang. In January 2011, Wong and Albert Chan announced that they were resigning from the League of Social Democrats over differences with his successor Andrew To's leadership over what stance to take towards the Democratic Party after Wong Yuk-man's protege Edward Yum failed in passing a no-confidence motion against To. As two of the party's three legislators, the move left the party and the remaining legislator, Leung Kwok-hung ('Long Hair'), in a difficult position. Wong also said that factional fighting within the party had become so hostile that it was beyond his and Chan's ability to rectify the situation. With Chan, he went on to launch People Power, under which name he continued to sit in Legco.

In the 2011 July 1 march after leading activists on a march from Wan Chai to Central, Wong Yuk-man and Albert Chan organised their supporters to break through a police cordon, occupied a major road in Central and scuffled with the police, bringing traffic to a standstill. Wong and Chan were later arrested for unlawful assembly. They were later convicted in April 2013. Eastern Court magistrate Joseph To Ho-shing accused Wong of being "untrustworthy" and lying in a bid to escape the charges. Wong called on his supporters to be "well-prepared for a long struggle" against the government and said he feared for the day when local courts would be "manipulated by the Communist Party."

Wong decided to challenge the Democratic Party in the 2011 District Council elections. People Power put forward 62 candidates, many of whom ran in constituencies against Democratic Party candidates. The party won just one seat, in Fung Cheung, where its candidate Johnny Mak Ip-sing did not face another candidate from the pro-democracy camp. Given the poor showing, Albert Chan admitted that the strategy had failed. Nevertheless, he insisted that the party would 'stay the course'.

On 20 May 2013, Wong Yuk-man announced his resignation from People Power. It was believed to be related to his earlier split with Stephen Shiu Yeuk-yuen, the owner of the Hong Kong Reporter and People Power's financial support over the Occupy Central plan, which he strongly disagreed with.

=== Turn to localism ===
From 2013, Wong became increasingly sympathetic to the localist cause. Together with his protege Wong Yeung-tat, they organised memorials for the Tiananmen Square protests of 1989, as opposed to the main candlelight vigil held by pan-democrats' Hong Kong Alliance in Support of Patriotic Democratic Movements of China (HKASPDMC), which they criticised it for having a Chinese nationalistic theme. They organised its alternative 4 June rally in Tsim Sha Tsui. The alternative event attracted 200 people in 2013 and 7,000 in 2014, compared with 180,000 and 150,000 respectively for the main event.

=== Glass throwing incident ===
On 3 July 2014 during a Q&A session of the Legislative Council, Wong was accused of intentionally hurting Chief Executive Leung Chun-ying by hurling a glass at him in a protest. Wong was charged of common assault. He claimed that he was first intentionally throwing papers towards a location where no one was standing, and he switched to throwing water only when there were not many documents left on the table. He said the glass was released accidentally as security guards were pulling him back. He was later convicted on 19 October 2016.

On 27 September 2018, Wong Yuk-man's assault conviction was overturned.

=== 2016 Legislative Council election ===
In the 2016 Legislative Council election, he ran a campaign with militant localist camp Civic Passion and Chin Wan to promote their political platform in amending the Basic Law to achieve full autonomy for Hong Kong. He was under attack by his former supporter Ho Chi-kwong, who accused him of his "unethical" political past. He received an unexpected loss, losing to Yau Wai-ching from the localist Youngspiration by only 424 votes. He blamed his failure on making "too many enemies in his political career" and "not enough effort". He said he would focus on developing the online radio station My Radio.

On 14 April 2017, Wong announced his intention to quit politics, not taking part in political affairs, not participating or organising any political groups, and not joining any elections.

== Religion ==
During the outbreak of SARS in 2003, Wong became a Christian and baptized in 2008. He helped Media Evangelism Limited, a Christian media organisation in Hong Kong, advertise its films and programmes. In 2006, Wong recorded songs with the Amazing Grace Worship Music Ministry.

His liberal views on gay rights have drawn criticism from Protestant churches. Wong support laws to protect discrimination against gays. He advocated gays should be protected from domestic violence, which was criticised by evangelical churches. He referred to the Society for Truth and Light, a conservative Christian right organisation, as a "terrorist organisation," and said many of its activities were "nonsense", promoting the "Talibanization" of Hong Kong. He was a guest of the International Day Against Homophobia protest in Hong Kong on 21 May 2009.

== Publications ==
- Ultimately Arrogant History – The Ten Powerful Courtiers (歷史幾串都有 – 十大權臣) ISBN 988-99103-8-1
- Ultimately Cruel History – The Ten Emperors (歷史幾狼都有 – 十大帝王) ISBN 962-678-274-9
- Yuk-Man Reveals (毓民踢爆) ISBN 962-577-103-4

Party political offices
New political party	Chairman of League of Social Democrats; 2006–2010	Succeeded by Andrew To
Legislative Council of Hong Kong
Preceded by Lau Chin-shek	Member of Legislative Council; Representative for Kowloon West; 2008–2016	Succeeded by Lau Siu-lai
