= 2016 Mong Kok civil unrest =

Protests in Hong Kong

- Part of Hong Kong protests against mainlandisation
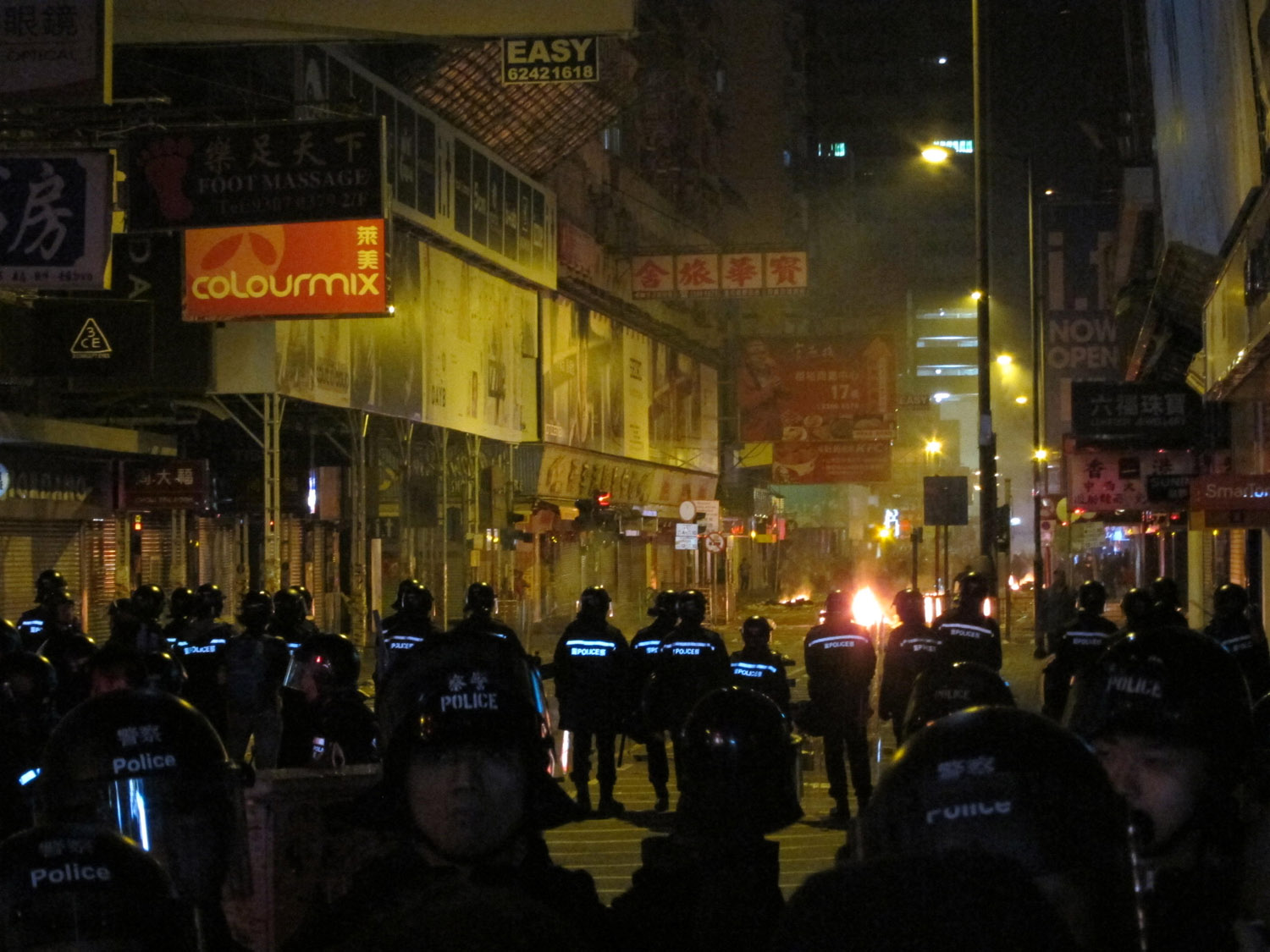
- Police on Sai Yeung Choi Street South in the morning of 9 February
- Date: 8–9 February 2016
- Location: Mong Kok, Kowloon, Hong Kong
- Caused by: Food and Environmental Hygiene Department crackdown on unlicensed hawkers; Strained relationship between the police and the public
- Methods: Riots, vandalism, arson, assault

Parties
Protesters: Hong Kong Indigenous	HKSAR Government: Hong Kong Police Force; Food and Environmental Hygiene Department

Lead figures
Ray Wong; Edward Leung	Crusade Yau

Units involved
	Police Tactical Unit; Special Tactical Contingent

Number
700	Unknown

Casualties and losses
130 injured 74 arrested	90 police officers injured

Civil unrest occurred in Mong Kok, Hong Kong from the night of 8 February 2016 until the following morning. This incident occurred following the government's crackdown on unlicensed street hawkers during the Chinese New Year holidays. Eventually, violent clashes broke out between police and protesters, resulting in injuries on both sides.

The Hong Kong government has officially classified the violent incident as a riot (旺角暴亂), while some media outlets and social media platforms have opted to call the event the "Fishball Revolution" (魚蛋革命), in reference to fishballs, a popular Hong Kong street food. This incident has been described by The Economist as "the worst outbreak of rioting since the 1960s."

== Background ==
=== Political context ===
After the 2014 protests, the popularity of the then Chief Executive of Hong Kong, Leung Chun-ying continued to be low, dropping slightly below the low point it had during the protests. His administration also received poor popularity ratings in a survey conducted by the Hong Kong University Public Opinion Programme (HKPOP), an institute affiliated with the University of Hong Kong. The relationship between the Hong Kong Police Force, and the general public also became strained due to a number of controversies, including the beating of protester Ken Tsang by seven plainclothes officers in Admiralty, the indiscriminate clubbing of members of the public by superintendent Franklin Chu in Mong Kok during the 2014 protests and the police's refusal to prosecute the offending officers.

The events of 2014 spawned a number of new activist groups with some taking an anti-government and militant stance. Hong Kong Indigenous, a localist camp party formed in early 2015, had previously been involved in violent clashes with police in several anti-parallel trading protests. The various localist groups hold a strong anti-mainland sentiment, generally with the view that the increasing political and economic integration of Hong Kong and Mainland China, as well as the influx of Mainland tourists and immigrants were undermining the autonomy and identity of Hong Kong.

=== Hawkers crackdown ===
The Chinese New Year holidays have traditionally attracted many unlicensed hawkers (street vendors), selling Hong Kong street foods and other products, at popular locations including Sai Yeung Choi Street, Mong Kok and Kweilin Street, Sham Shui Po. Despite operating without licence, the Food and Environmental Hygiene Department (FEHD) had, in the past, not taken action against hawkers during the Lunar New Year holidays. However, in the years prior to the unrest, the FEHD had begun monitoring unlicensed cooked food hawkers during the Chinese New Year at night markets over fears of unsanitary practices, obstruction of roadways and general disruption. During the Chinese New Year period in 2014, FEHD staff conducted surprise inspections at Kweilin Street Night Market, making arrests and confiscating stalls, causing some public disquiet. However, shortly after the FEHD officers departed, the hawkers returned, and the night market resumed.

In November 2014, Sham Shui Po District Council, passed a motion of "zero tolerance" towards unlicensed hawkers for the upcoming Chinese New Year. However, grassroots organisations complained that, due to the government's refusal to issue new hawker licences or construct new markets, hawkers could only subsist by defying the law; they further asserted that Kweilin Street night market was enjoying a resurgence in popularity and a "zero tolerance" policy would only exacerbate grievances. During the Chinese New Year period in 2015, there were at least three groups providing vocal support for street hawkers in Sham Shui Po with Hong Kong Indigenous embarking on a campaign of street cleaning to allay concerns over hygiene. In 2016 however, street hawkers were put under pressure by a citywide FEHD crackdown which drew discontent from locals.

From the evening of 2 February 2016, in the run up to Chinese New Year, hawkers in Tuen Mun who were setting up stalls outside a mall near Leung King Estate, operated by Link REIT, were opposed by a group of masked men identifying themselves as "management" and claiming to represent The Link. These men later insisted that hawkers could no longer set up in or around the estate so as not to affect the mall tenants. During the late night market, a number of incidents occurred but were not acted upon by police.

On the evening of 7 February, Chinese New Year's Eve, tens of hawkers began setting up stalls in the Kwelin Street night market but were chased away by the FEHD. Hong Kong Polytechnic University Sociology lecturer and activist Lau Siu-Lai, acted in deliberate defiance of the FEHD and was arrested. Lau was arrested when she began to help sell grilled cuttlefish in defiance of the FEHD officers, and her arrest was ordered by the senior officer present. There was disquiet over her arrest at the scene, and a number of protesters immediately went to picket the Sham Shui Po Police Station where she was held. That night and through the next day, activists began to contact hawkers to encourage them to set up stalls in Mong Kok, and also began the online call for supporters to protect local Hong Kong distinctiveness.

== Course of events ==
On 8 February, the first day of the Chinese New Year, FEHD officers attempted to patrol the side streets of Mong Kok. Hong Kong Indigenous called for action online to shield the hawkers, and by around 9 pm a few hundred had gathered and verbally assaulted the FEHD officers.

At around 10 pm, a taxi driving into Portland Street accidentally hit an old man. Protesters blocked the road and prevented the taxi from leaving. The Hong Kong Police arrived and surrounded the car, warning others not to get closer. The police left shortly after and returned with a portable podium for crowd control at 11:45 pm, this sparked anger in the crowd. Around midnight, violent clashes broke out between police and protesters as police urged them to clear the street. The police put on protective gear, including helmets and shields and used batons and pepper spray on the protesters, while some of the protesters, equipped with home-made shields, goggles, helmets and gloves, threw projectiles at the police.

At around 2 am, a traffic police officer was injured on Argyle Street. Protesters continued to surround the injured officer and attacking him with projectiles, prompting his colleagues to approach the scene to protect him. One such officer fired two warning shots into the air in an attempt to prevent further advancement of the protesters. Warning shots are not permitted according to the Use of Force guidelines in the Police Force Ordinance. The scene descended into chaos as protesters charged the police line and engaged in scuffles and fighting with the police and tossed glass bottles and rubbish bins at them, At 2:30 am, more police arrived at the scene to disperse the protesters. The standoff subsequently moved to Nathan Road at 3 am.

At 4 am, the first of multiple fires was started in Sai Yeung Choi Street South, followed by three more ignited in the same street. Some protesters set fire to rubbish bins surrounding Shantung Street and Soy Street, including the junctions of Fife Street and Portland Street and of Nathan Road and Nelson Street, these were put out by the police and firemen. Both lanes of Nathan Road were blocked from south of Argyle Street and the Mong Kok MTR station was shut down.

At 4:30 am, the Special Tactical Squad were deployed in the intersection of Soy Street and Sai Yeung Choi Street South as a result of failure of combatant from the police force and the escalation of the rioters. They successfully cleared the protesters within 30 seconds. However, after 5 minutes, due to lack of reinforcements, they were forced to fully fall back, with one constable injured.

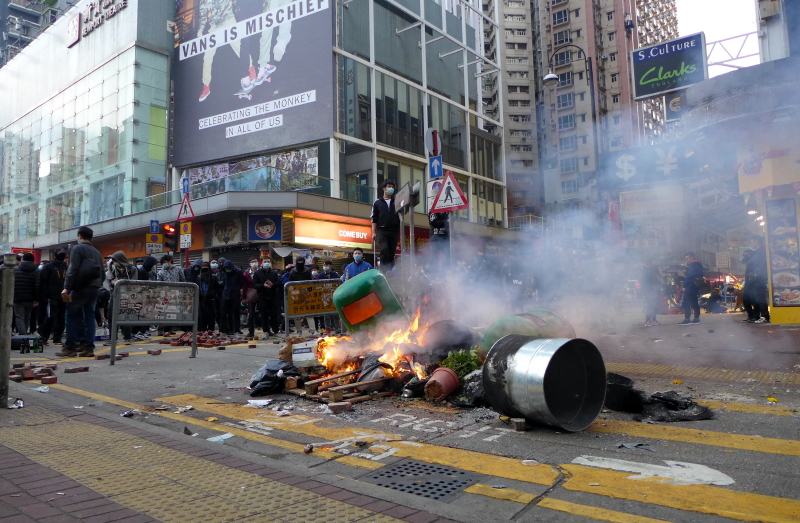
A fire set in Soy Street by the rioters on the morning of 9 February.

At 7:15 am, protesters were dispersed from Soy Street near Fa Yuen Street, following a long standoff, after police officers of the Police Tactical Unit were deployed. Protesters gradually dispersed around 8 am. The streets in Mong Kok were calm by 9:00 am, and Mong Kok MTR station was reopened at 9:45 am.

A total of 61 people were arrested, including Edward Leung, spokesman of the Hong Kong Indigenous and candidate for the Legislative Council by-election. One of the members of Youngspiration, another localist group, was also arrested. 90 police officers and several reporters were also injured in the violence. The Hong Kong Journalists Association said that a Ming Pao journalist was beaten by a policeman despite declaring his identity as a journalist. Reporters from broadcasters RTHK and TVB were also injured by protesters.

=== Incidences of intimidation at Leung King Estate by "management" ===
Separate minor conflicts continued to occur at Leung King Plaza in Leung King Estate, Tuen Mun where hawkers had gathered. A group of men dressed in dark jackets with "manager" (管理員) printed on the backs were reported to be acting, according to residents and hawkers, in an intimidating manner nightly since 2 February. More than 200 showed up to protest against the men combating the hawkers on the night of 8 February. Some minor clashes broke out between the self-proclaimed managers and the protesters, and required mediation by the police. Two protesters were arrested and one reporter was injured during the clash.

Conflicts between the control team and the public reoccurred on the night of 9 February. The control team was filmed beating up protesters while police stood by and prevented others from being involved. A reporter was also beaten up by the control team. A 31-year-old man was arrested for causing disorder in a public place. He allegedly interfered with a worker performing his duties at Leung King Estate. The Link REIT distanced itself from the clashes and denied the hawker control team was part of its staff.

== Reactions ==
=== Chinese government ===
Following the incident the central government declared the localist groups, which it deemed responsible for the violence, as "separatists". On 11 February, more than two days after the unrest, a Foreign Ministry spokesman stated that the "riot [was] plotted mainly by local radical separatist organisation ... The Chinese central government believes and firmly supports the Hong Kong SAR government and the police in safeguarding social security, protecting Hong Kong residents and their property, and punishing illegal and criminal activities in accordance with the law, so as to maintain the overall stability of the Hong Kong society."

Director of the Liaison Office of the Central People's Government in Hong Kong Zhang Xiaoming, branded participants as "radical separatists" who were "inclined toward terrorism."

The People's Liberation Army released a statement holding "individual local radical separatist organisation(s)" responsible for the riot as well as criticising western media for "beautifying the unrest" in its early reports.

=== Hong Kong government ===
The Hong Kong Police referred to the event as a "riot" and the protestors a "mob". "Radical elements have come with self-made weapons and shields and clashed with police," Crusade Yau Siu-kei, deputy district commander of the Mong Kok district said. "The situation ran out of control and became a riot." He also said it does not rule out the riot was "organised", claiming that prearranged vehicles were used by protesters to transport equipment.

The police released a statement released at 3:23 am on 9 February, strongly condemning the clashes in Mong Kok, and defending its "resolute actions" including the deployment of batons, and pepper spray to stop "unlawful violence acts," and vowed "resolute enforcement actions will be taken against any illegal acts to preserve public order and safeguard public safety." Another statement released at 6 am said: "Police reiterate that any acts endangering public order and public safety will not be tolerated. The Hong Kong community regard that the public should express their views in a rational and peaceful manner. Police will take enforcement actions decisively on law-breaking behaviours."

The Hong Kong government condemned the protests, saying "mobs have taken part in a riot in Mong Kok, attacking police officers on duty and media covering the incident at the site" in a statement. It stated that "the mobs would be apprehended and brought to justice."

Then Chief Executive Leung Chun-ying justified the police firing of warning shots, as the rioters had attacked policemen who were already injured and lying on the ground. "Any big city facing a similar nature of events would classify it as a riot, not just for the government but society as a whole," he said. "The police exercised maximum restraint" when compared with other western countries.

=== Politicians ===
Ip Kwok-him, a Beijing-loyalist Democratic Alliance for the Betterment and Progress of Hong Kong (DAB) legislator and chairman of panel of Security of the Legislative Council, defended the police decision to open fire as "appropriate" given the critical circumstances and believed it was an organised crime.

Yau Tsim Mong District Council chairman Chris Ip Ngo-tung, a DAB member, also condemned the violent actions, stating his belief that the people of Hong Kong "would not agree with such barbarian acts." He thanked police and reporters for their duties during the events.

The Democratic Party, a pro-democracy party, also released a statement saying that it condemns and does not tolerate any violence and acts of arson, while sending their sympathy to the injured. It urged a full investigation over the firing of warning shots by a police officer, and asked the government to reflect on the underlying problems such as the people's frustration, their loss of faith in the government, and the government's hawker policy.

Lau Siu-kai, vice-president of the Chinese Association of Hong Kong and Macao Studies, a thinktank close to Beijing, suggested that the Hong Kong Basic Law Article 23, the proposed national security law which was strongly opposed by the Hong Kong public, should be introduced in the wake of the Mong Kok unrest.

=== Student groups ===
Seven local university student unions issued statements condemning police violence and declaring their support for those who took part in the protests in Mong Kok. The Hong Kong University Students’ Union (HKUSU) issued a statement entitled "Forever we stand with the rebels", pledging that they "shall never turn our back on or leave them alone and unassisted."

The Hong Kong Baptist University Students' Union's statement also condemned the government and the police for the unreasonable arrest of protesters, beating up journalists and oppressing Hong Kong Indigenous members. "Between the high wall and the egg, we will always stand on the side of the egg," it said.

The Student Union of the Chinese University of Hong Kong criticised police action and said that the fire of resistance had been ignited by Chief Executive Leung Chun-Ying. "Hongkongers must remember the totalitarian regime and unite," it said.

=== Activist groups ===
Scholarism, a student activist group that took a leading role in the 2014 protests, condemned police for the excessive use of force since the 2014 protests. The group expressed shock at the police's deliberate provocation of citizens and for escalating violence on protestors. Joshua Wong, the group's convenor, disagreed with the violence, noting that peaceful protest did not achieve any change, blamed the government for the increasing divisions in Hong Kong society and the radicalisation of protests since 2014 Hong Kong protests. Wong questioned the rapidity of the police arrests on this occasion compared with the apparent stalling in prosecuting the officers accused of beating Ken Tsang during the Umbrella Revolution.

Ray Wong, convenor of Hong Kong Indigenous who also took a role in the early stage of the protests, disagreed with Leung Chun-Ying framing the clashes as a "riot", stating that protestors were only helping the hawkers to do business until the police rushed into Shantung Street at midnight. He dismissed the claim that the violent clashes were staged. He thought that throwing bricks should not be considered as fierce, as compared to other countries. He also believed that firing warning shots was inappropriate.

=== Journalists ===
The Hong Kong News Executives' Association, the Hong Kong Press Photographers Association, and the Hong Kong Journalists Association (HKJA) all released statements condemning the acts of violence and verbal assaults against reporters, as well as the prevention of reporters from reporting. The Hong Kong News Executives' Association stated that these actions were a serious impediment to the freedom of the press, destroyed the rule of law in Hong Kong, and deprived the public of their right to know.

=== Social media ===
Hong Kong social media users took to Twitter using the hashtag #fishballrevolution, in reference to the popular street food commonly sold by hawkers. Some highlighted the fact that the protest was about the problems faced by street food hawkers, while the other suggested that violent factions had hijacked the protest for their own ends.

Google Trends showed a sharp uptick in interest over fishball in the light of the unrest, with searches for "fishball" jumping 34 per cent and "fish ball" 26 per cent, mainly from Singapore and the Philippines.

== Subsequent events ==
=== Arrests ===
Between the end of the protests and 10 February 54 men and 9 women have been arrested for suspected involvement in the unrest. Edward Leung and around 20 members and volunteers of the group were arrested. A member of Youngspiration and another from Civic Passion, two localist groups, were also arrested. Their alleged offences include participating in unlawful assembly, attacking police officers, refusing to be arrested, obstructing police and carrying weapons. 38 of them have been charged with rioting under the Public Order Ordinance (Cap. 245 § 19), which was amended in 1970 in the wake of the 1967 Leftist riots. A lone man, who was walking towards Argyle Street on 8 February and who then found himself surrounded by ten police in riot gear, was arrested on charges of obstructing police but later charged with "rioting". A video showing the events leading up to the arrest, showing that he followed orders shouted at him by police, quickly went viral.

On 10 February, Derek Lam (林淳軒), a 22-year-old member of Scholarism, was arrested by the police at the Hong Kong airport while en route to a vacation in Taiwan with his family. He was taken into custody and subsequently charged with rioting. The group confirmed that Lam was present in Mong Kok from 10:00 pm Monday night to 2:15 am, but was not involved in the violence. The police also attempted to search Lam's flat without a warrant but were prevented by Lam's lawyer. Scholarism protested at the "arbitrary" arrest, and the Divinity School of Chung Chi College at the Chinese University of Hong Kong, where Lam was a student, also defended Lam and denied he had been involved in the riots. The school also demanded the police provide justification for his arrest.

Police suspected a possible link of an eco-warehouse in Kwai Chung to the Mong Kok unrest. On 11 February morning, three people, a 34-year-old architectural draftsman, an unemployed woman aged 46 and a woman aged 47 who sold organic food, were arrested on suspicion of possessing offensive weapons with intent after the police raided their leased unit in the Vigor Industrial Building. A number of items that police deemed were offensive weapons, including 18 knives, wooden batons, metal rods, water pipes, surgical masks, work gloves, Walkie-talkies, a toy gun and bottles of liquid and crystallised chemicals of unknown composition were seized. However, the environmental protection group "Oh Yes It's Free" – which operates the warehouse aiming to categorising rubbish and recycling it – protested that those arrested were innocent and the confiscated articles were donations they had received from the public. The goods and materials found at the site were collected as part of the group's philosophy of reuse and recycling and were temporarily stored in the warehouse awaiting treatment, disposal or collection by the next public.

On 11 February, police raided the home of Hong Kong Indigenous convener Ray Wong in Tseung Kwan O but did not find him. Subsequently, Wong disappeared from all media contact. Wong was arrested at a friend's residence in Tin Shui Wai on 22 February for "incitement to riot and possessing prohibited items".

By 23 February, a total number of 74 people had been arrested in connection to the clashes, of which more than 40 were charged with rioting.

=== Complaints against police ===
A Ming Pao journalist, surnamed Tang, filed a formal complaint with the Complaints Against Police Office after he was filmed being pushed down and beaten by officers. In the video, Tang is heard identifying himself repeatedly as a journalist. Ming Pao released a statement condemning the police officers involved and called upon the force to investigate.

=== Official inquiry ===
The Hong Kong government flatly rejected holding an independent inquiry into the civil unrest, and its official statement caused controversy. In referring to the Mong Kok incident as a "riot" and the 1967 leftist riots, lasting over six months and led to over 50 deaths, as "disturbances", the government apparently sought to redefined the 1967 riots as legitimate political struggle. On 9 February, police commissioner Stephen Lo Wai-Chung announced that a "full investigation" will be held to determine whether the firing of two warning shots by an unidentified police officer was appropriate.

=== Disappointment within police force ===
Frontline police officers were reported deeply disappointed with their senior management that left more than 90 officers wounded. They were disappointed with Commissioner Stephen Lo Wai-Chung's announcement of a full investigation. "What does he need to investigate? Lo should have stood up for the frontline officers who were beaten up and attacked by the mob, like [former commissioner Andy Tsang] did in the past," an officer said. Lo was questioned whether he could safeguard the pride and dignity of the force when he appeared "soft" and "feeble" to the public.

An officer slammed the force for poor arrangements and inadequate gear, citing the least equipped traffic officers being at the very front to handle the protestors. He questioned if a political agenda was behind the decision not to use tear gas. He suggested the use of rubber bullets would be justified in the face of such a violent, large-scale riot. Junior Police Officers’ Association chairman Joe Chan Cho-Kwong appealed to the Legislative Council to back the use of "new model weapons and gears", including water cannons to maintain public order.

=== New Territories East by-election ===
In the Legislative Council New Territories East by-election took place on 28 February, Edward Leung Tin-kei who took a main role in the unrest, received a better-than-expected result by taking 66,524 votes, 15% of the total votes, coming behind pro-democratic Civic Party Alvin Yeung (37%) and Beijing-loyalist DAB Holden Chow (35%).

== See also ==
- 2016 Hong Kong legislative election
- 2016 New Territories East by-election
- 2019–20 Hong Kong protests
- Common purpose – Criminal liability of participants in a riot even if they are not involved in any violent acts
- Hong Kong 1966 riots – "Star Ferry riots"
- Hong Kong 1967 Leftist riots
- Umbrella Movement
