= 2016 New Territories East by-election =

Legislative Council of Hong Kong election

- 28 February 2016
- Opinion polls
- Turnout: 46.18%
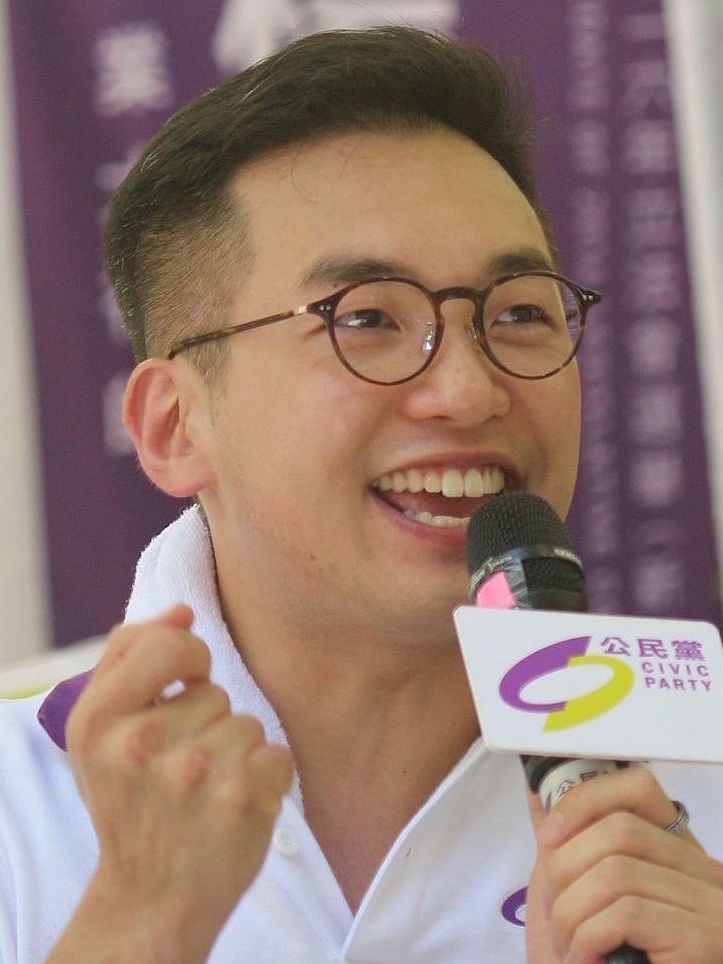

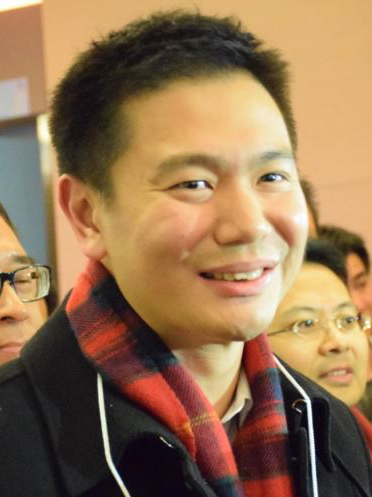

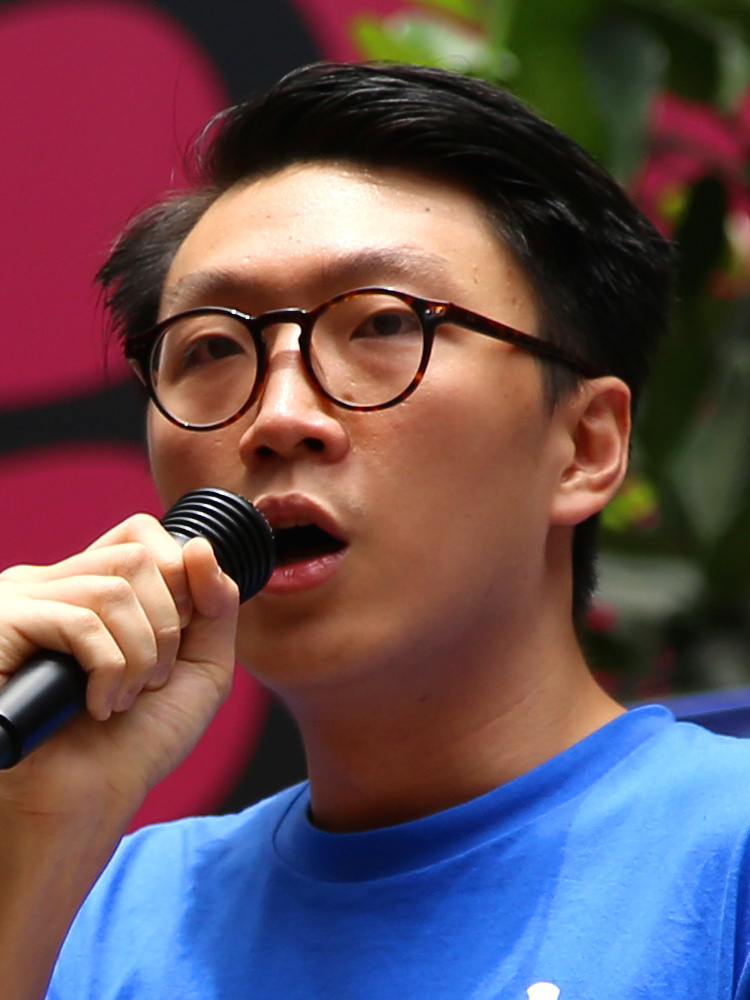
Candidate	Alvin Yeung	Holden Chow	Edward Leung
Party	Civic	DAB	Indigenous
Alliance	Pro-democracy	Pro-Beijing	Localist
Popular vote	160,880	150,329	66,524
Percentage	37.19%	34.75%	15.38%
- Parties with most votes by each district
Legislative Councillor before election
Ronny Tong (resigned)
Nonpartisan
Elected Legislative Councillor
Alvin Yeung
Civic

The 2016 New Territories East by-election was held on 28 February 2016 after the incumbent Legislative Councillor Ronny Tong Ka-wah of New Territories East quit the Civic Party and resigned from the Legislative Council of Hong Kong (LegCo), effective on 1 October 2015.

The winning candidate in the by-election serves a term of only around five months, as the session of legislature ends in July 2016. Though the term is short, the pan-democrats saw the seat as crucial, fearing that the pro-Beijing camp would modify the rules of procedure if they gained a majority of the geographical constituency seats to block pan-democrats' filibustering, as the seats in the geographical constituencies commanded by two camps were evenly 17–17 before the election.

Alvin Yeung Ngok-kiu of the pan-democracy camp held the seat for the Civic Party with 37 percent of the popular vote. Holden Chow Ho-ding of the Beijing-loyalist Democratic Alliance for the Betterment and Progress of Hong Kong (DAB) came second, and Edward Leung Tin-kei of the localist Hong Kong Indigenous - who took a leading role in the 9 February Mong Kok civil unrest - came third.

== Background ==
On 22 June 2015, few days after the legislative vote on the 2015 Hong Kong electoral reform over the electoral method of the 2017 Chief Executive election, moderate democrat Ronny Tong Ka-wah, who had campaigned for his mid-way reform proposal, announced that he would quit the Civic party that he co-founded and would also resign from the Legislative Council as he said it was inappropriate for him to retain his seat in the legislature because he stood for election as a Civic Party member which was effective on 1 October 2015.

After the resignation of Ronny Tong, the seats commanded by the pan-democrats and pro-Beijing camp in the geographical constituencies became 17-17. If the pro-Beijing camp had gained the majority of the seats, the pan-democrats feared that they would have modified the rules of procedure, which require a majority in both geographical and functional constituencies, in order to block filibustering, which had been used by pan-democrats as a tool against legislative bills by the Leung Chun-ying administration that they saw as unreasonable.

== Candidates ==
Alvin Yeung Ngok-kiu of the Civic Party, the number two candidate after Ronny Tong in the Civic Party's list running in New Territories East constituency in the last LegCo election in 2012, was named by Tong as his successor. Other pan-democratic parties also made way for the Civic Party in order to have only one candidate to represent the pan-democracy camp. Youngspiration, a localist group intended to field a candidate and invited the Civic Party to hold a primary, modeling from the pan-democratic primary for the 2007 Hong Kong Island by-election, but later dropped out due to the lack of time for a primary. Yeung submitted his nomination form on 5 January 2016, the first day for the nominations.

Holden Chow Ho-ding, vice chairman of the largest Beijing-loyalist party Democratic Alliance for the Betterment and Progress of Hong Kong (DAB) who submitted his nomination form on 5 January 2016, represents the pro-Beijing camp in the by-election. He was endorsed by major pro-Beijing parties, New People's Party, Business and Professionals Alliance for Hong Kong and Hong Kong Federation of Trade Unions.

Christine Fong Kwok-shan, former member of the Liberal Party, independent Sai Kung District Councillor who aimed to provide a choice between pro-democracy and pro-Beijing camp, submitted her nomination form on 7 January 2016.

Wong Sing-chi, former member of the Democratic Party, announced his candidacy for the newly formed centrist party, Third Side, aiming to offer an alternative to the now-polarised pan-democratic and pro-Beijing camps. He submitted his nomination form on 11 January 2016.

Lau Chi-shing, a nonpartisan candidate submitted his nomination form on 13 January 2016.

Edward Leung Tin-kei, a member of localist Hong Kong Indigenous, submitted his nomination form on 15 January 2016. He was supported by the localist groups such as Youngspiration and Civic Passion, as well as figures like legislator Wong Yuk-man and scholar Chin Wan.

Albert Leung Sze-ho, an independent candidate submitted his nomination form on 16 January 2016, vowed to modify the rules of procedure in order to block pan-democrats' filibustering.

== Mong Kok civil unrest ==
Edward Leung Tin-kei was involved in the Mong Kok civil unrest broke out on 8 January in which the Hong Kong Indigenous called for actions online to defend the unlicensed street hawkers from being cracked down by Food and Environmental Hygiene Department inspectors and escalated into violent clashes between the police and the protesters. The group also announced that it would “exercise” Leung's “power” as an election candidate to hold an election march in the Mong Kok night market. Leung was later arrested at the scene and was subsequently released on bail. Other candidates disagreed with the violent acts while Wong Sing-chi of the Third Side asked for an explanation from the Indigenous.

Political scientist Ivan Choy Chi-keung believed that the unrest would attract conservative voters come out to vote for the pro-Beijing candidate Holden Chow Ho-ding of the Democratic Alliance for the Betterment and Progress of Hong Kong and further consolidate the radical localist base of Leung, which would place the pan-democracy Civic Party's Alvin Yeung Ngok-kiu at a disadvantage.

== Electoral forums ==
A live broadcast electoral forum conducted in English was held during the broadcasting time of Backchat on RTHK Radio 3 on 17 February. A pre-recorded electoral panel discussion conducted in English was held by The Pulse on RTHK was first broadcast on ATV World on 19 February.

Debates of the 2016 Legislative Council New Territories East by-election
No.	Date	Time	Broadcaster	Moderator(s)	Participants						
P Participant. S Invitee. N Non-invitee. A Absent invitee.					Lau	Wong	Chow	A. Leung	Fong	E. Leung	Yeung
1	17 February	8:30 p.m.	RTHK	Hugh Chiverton; Michael Chugani	A	A	P	A	P	P	P
2	19 February	7:30 p.m.	ATV	Steve Vines	A	A	P	P	P	P	P

== Polling ==
Date(s) conducted	Polling organisation/client	Sample size	Lau	Wong	Chow	A. Leung	Fong	E. Leung	Yeung	None of above/ Undecided	Lead
28 Feb	New Territories East by-election Result	—	0.5%	4.0%	34.8%	0.4%	7.7%	15.4%	37.2%	—N/a	2.4%
22–23 Feb	HKU POP/D100	506	1%	8%	20%	1%	11%	12%	24%	23%	4%
11–20 Feb	HKRA	1,071	3%	11%	20%	1%	5%	10%	22%	28%	2%
17–18 Feb	HKU POP/HK01	130	6%	4%	14%	4%	8%	9%	15%	40%	1%

== Result ==
Election result by District Council constituency.

New Territories East by-election 2016
Party	Candidate	Votes	%	±%
Civic	Alvin Yeung Ngok-kiu	160,880	37.19	
DAB	Holden Chow Ho-ding	150,329	34.75	
Indigenous	Edward Leung Tin-kei	66,524	15.38	
Independent	Christine Fong Kwok-shan	33,424	7.73	
Third Side	Wong Sing-chi	17,295	4.00	
Nonpartisan	Lau Chi-shing	2,271	0.52	
Independent	Albert Leung Sze-ho	1,858	0.43	
Majority		10,551	2.44	
Total valid votes		432,581	100.00	
Rejected ballots		1,639		
Turnout		434,220	46.18	
Registered electors		940,340		
Civic gain from Nonpartisan		Swing		

Popular vote
Yeung	37.19%
Chow	34.75%
E. Leung	15.38%
Fong	7.73%
Wong	4.00%
Lau	0.52%
A. Leung	0.43%

== See also ==
- 2015 Hong Kong electoral reform
- 2016 Hong Kong legislative election
- List of Hong Kong by-elections
