= Alvin Yeung =

Hong Kong barrister and politician (born 1981)

Alvin Yeung Ngok-kiu
- 楊岳橋
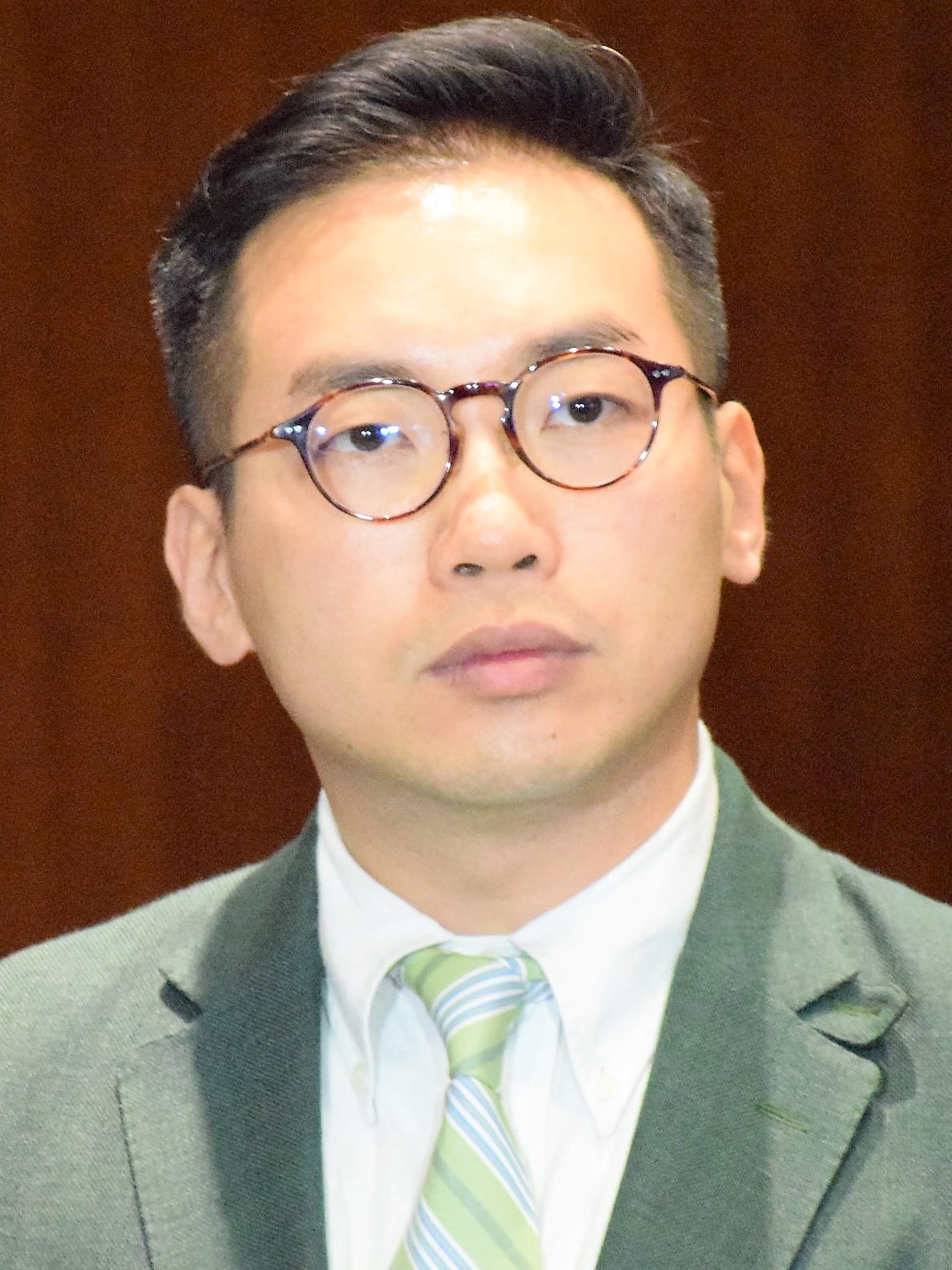
- Yeung in 2017.

Leader of the Civic Party
- In office 1 October 2016 – 28 November 2020
- Preceded by: Alan Leong
- Succeeded by: Party dissolved

Member of the Legislative Council
- In office 29 February 2016 – 11 November 2020
- Preceded by: Ronny Tong
- Succeeded by: Constituency abolished
- Constituency: New Territories East

Personal details
- Born: 5 June 1981 (age 45) British Hong Kong
- Citizenship: China (Hong Kong); Canada (until 2012)
- Party: Civic Party (2011–2021)
- Spouse: Eve Chan Wing-yue (m. 2017)
- Education: University of Western Ontario (BA); Peking University (LL.M.); University of Bristol (MA)
- Occupation: Barrister, politician

Alvin Yeung
- Chinese: 楊岳橋
Transcriptions
Standard Mandarin
- Hanyu Pinyin: Yáng Yuèqiáo
Yue: Cantonese
- Yale Romanization: Yèuhng Ngohk kìuh
- Jyutping: Joeng^{4} Ngok^{6}-kiu^{4}

Alvin Yeung Ngok-kiu (Chinese: 楊岳橋; born 5 June 1981) is a Hong Kong barrister and politician. He was formerly the leader of the Civic Party and a member of the Legislative Council of Hong Kong, representing New Territories East after winning the 2016 by-election. On 11 November 2020, Yeung was disqualified from the Legislative Council, along with three other lawmakers of the pan-democratic camp, by the central government in Beijing on request of the Hong Kong government. A mass resignation of pan-democrats the same day left the Legislative Council without a substantial opposition.

== Background ==
Yeung was born in Yuen Long, Hong Kong, in 1981 as the only child to a restaurant owner and a jewellery dealer. He and his parents immigrated to Canada in the early 1990s after the 1989 Tiananmen massacre. When he immigrated, he was sent to St.Andrew's College. Yeung graduated from the University of Western Ontario with a degree in political science and obtained a master of laws in constitutional and administrative laws from Peking University around 2003.

== Political career ==
Inspired by the major 2003 July 1 march, Yeung joined a group called "7.1 People Pile". He campaigned for Alan Leong Kah-kit, a barrister-turned-politician, in the 2004 Legislative Council election. From the following year, he studied for a Master of Arts in legal studies at the University of Bristol and became a certified barrister in 2008.

He joined the Civic Party in 2011 and ran in the 2011 District Council election in Tai Po Market but was defeated. He was later elected to the Election Committee through the legal subsector in the 2011 Hong Kong Election Committee Subsector election. In 2012 Legislative Council election, he partnered with Ronny Tong to run in the New Territories East and successfully got Tong re-elected. He gave up his Canadian citizenship to compete in the election.

Yeung is currently chairman of the New Territories East branch of the party and member of the Appeal Panel (Housing), and also co-host of the political talk-show "Teacup in a Storm" on D100 radio station.

He was recommended by Ronny Tong when Tong resigned from the Legislative Council in June 2015 to take up the seat in the February by-election. He retained the seat for the Civic Party by defeating Beijing-loyalist DAB candidate Holden Chow Ho-ding and localist camp Hong Kong Indigenous candidate Edward Leung Tin-kei, receiving 160,880 votes in the New Territories East constituency.

In the September 2016 general election, Yeung sought re-election in New Territories East. From his leading position in opinion polls, he cooperated with Labour Party's Fernando Cheung and later on with other pan-democrat candidates to split the votes evenly to maximise the block's chances of winning seven out of the nine seats. He was re-elected with 52,416 votes, along with six other anti-establishment candidates. Following the election, he succeeded Alan Leong as party leader, in an acting capacity from 1 October and formally, through a party election, in November.

=== Disqualification ===
Five weeks ahead of the (subsequently postponed) 2020 Hong Kong Legislative Council Election, on 30 July 2020, as Yeung prepared to defend his seat, the government stated that he was among a dozen pro-democracy candidates whose nominations were 'invalid', under an opaque process in which, nominally, civil servants – returning officers – assess whether, for instance, a candidate had objected to the enactment of the national security law, or was sincere in statements made disavowing separatism. On 11 November 2020, following a decision of the Standing Committee of the National People's Congress he was disqualified from Legislative Council along with three other lawmakers; this resulted in the resignation of a further 15 pro-democracy lawmakers.

=== National Security Law charges ===
==== Arrest ====
On 6 January 2021, Yeung was among 53 members of the pro-democratic camp who were arrested under the national security law, specifically its provision regarding alleged subversion. The group stood accused of the organisation of and participation in unofficial primary elections held by the camp in July 2020. Yeung was released on bail on 7 January.

==== Bail hearings ====
On 28 February 2021, Yeung was among 47 members of the pro-democratic camp who were officially charged with conspiracy to commit subversion under the national security law. He was denied bail and instead remain in detention before trial on 1 March. On the third day on 3 March, Alvin Yeung announced his resignations from the Civic party. Alvin Yeung said before addressing the court: "As a barrister, I would never have imagined that I would have to address the court in the docks. On March 2 five years ago, I was sworn in as a legislative councillor, fighting for Hongkongers, but five years later, I am fighting for my own freedom." Chief Magistrate Victor So adjourned the third day proceedings at 8:30 p.m. During the bail hearings, Yeung resigned from the Civic Party and later announced his decision to leave politics, also penning an open letter together with Kwok Ka-ki, Jeremy Tam and Lee Yue-shun, publicized on 15 April, which called for the party to disband.

==== Sentencing ====
Yeung pleaded guilty and was sentenced to 5 years and 1 month in prison on 19 November 2024. He was released from Stanley Prison on 28 March 2026.

Legislative Council of Hong Kong
Preceded by Ronny Tong	Member of Legislative Council; Representative for New Territories East; 2016–2020	Constituency abolished
Party political offices
Preceded by Alan Leong	Leader of Civic Party; 2016–2020	Vacant
