= Ray Wong =

Hong Kong activist (born 1993)

- 黃台仰
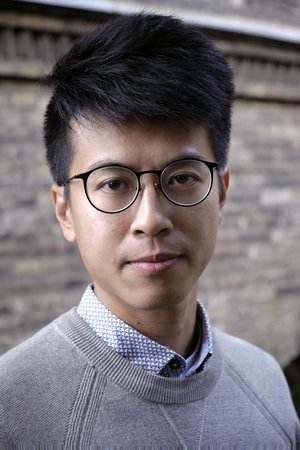
- Wong in October 2021

Convenor of Hong Kong Indigenous
- In office January 2015 – October 2016

Personal details
- Born: 15 September 1993 (age 32) British Hong Kong
- Education: Bachelor
- Alma mater: University of Göttingen
- Occupation: Activist, interior designer
- Known for: 2016 Mong Kok civil unrest

Ray Wong
- Traditional Chinese: 黃台仰
Transcriptions
Yue: Cantonese
- Yale Romanization: Wòhng Tòih yéuhng
- Jyutping: Wong^{4} Toi^{4} joeng^{5}

Ray Wong Toi-yeung (Chinese: 黃台仰; born 15 September 1993) is a Hong Kong activist. He is the founder of the localist camp group Hong Kong Indigenous, established alongside other activists disillusioned with the perceived ineffectiveness of Hong Kong's mainstream pro-democracy movement during the 2014 Hong Kong protests.

Wong played a prominent role in the 2016 Mong Kok civil unrest, which took place on Lunar New Year's Day (8 February 2016). Following the incident, he was arrested later that month. He later fled Hong Kong and became the first British national to be granted asylum in a member state of the European Union.

== Early life and career ==
He was born in Hong Kong in 1993 and studied at the Tang Shiu Kin Victoria Government Secondary School and the Caritas Bianchi College of Careers and worked as a freelance interior designer.

In October 2019, he started his study at the University of Göttingen in political science and philosophy.

== Founding of Hong Kong Indigenous ==
Wong participated in the 2014 Hong Kong protests which is often dubbed the "Umbrella Revolution". Wong witnessed use of excessive violence by the police on unarmed citizens during the protests. Wong believes use of force is justified to prevent violence from police. After the protests, he formed Hong Kong Indigenous, a localist group, with other young protesters he met in Mong Kok who shared disappointment at the failure of the protests and disaffection with its leaders.

Hong Kong Indigenous continued to organise and participate in other social movements, notably the anti-parallel trading protests in 2015, including the "Liberate Sheung Shui" on 24 January, "Liberate Tuen Mun" on 8 February and "Liberate Yuen Long" on 1 March. He was arrested five times in relation to those protests.

Wong is often seen to be anti-Mainland immigrant and holding the view that the influx of mainland immigrants is undermining Hong Kong culture and abusing the Hong Kong welfare system. He has also stated, however, that he would regard an immigrant as a Hongkonger if he or she is willing to defend Hong Kong, its culture and values. He often cites Benedict Anderson's book Imagined Communities to explain his vision of "Hongkonger" identity.

Wong also advocates for Hong Kong's right to self-determination, and is viewed as a separatist by the pro-Beijing camp.

== Mong Kok conflict ==
In the Mong Kok civil unrest on Chinese New Year's Day 2016, Wong took an active role as Hong Kong Indigenous called for actions online to protect street hawkers from law enforcement officials. The protests turned into violent clashes. After the clashes, he posted a recording online saying that he was unsure what will happen to him, and it might be his “final message”. He called Hong Kong people to continue protesting and make a difference, and concluded by quoting a Chinese saying: "Rather be a shattered vessel of jade than an unbroken piece of pottery."

On 11 February, police raided Wong's home in Tseung Kwan O but did not find him there. Subsequently, Wong disappeared from all media contact. He was arrested at a friend's residence in Tin Shui Wai on 22 February and charged the next day with riot and, on 28 June, with incitement to unlawful assembly and incitement to riot. He was charged for instigating riot, joint incitement and inciting others to take part in an unlawful assembly.

== Life in Europe ==
In November 2017, Wong failed to report to the police and return his travel documents to the court on 22 November after a judge-approved trip to Europe on condition of a HK$100,000 cash bail. The High Court issued an arrest warrant.

Wong was granted refugee protection in Germany in May 2018 together with Alan Li Tung-sing at a time when Hong Kong's protection for free speech and assembly and fair trials have diminished. Germany offers refugee protection to those being persecuted because of nationality, religion, political opinion or for belonging to a certain social group. He is the first British national granted asylum in the European Union. Proceedings of his asylum case obtained by Wong's lawyer showed that Chinese authorities contacted German immigration authorities in an attempt to prevent Germany from granting protection to Wong.

Wong began full-time studies in politics at the University of Göttingen in 2019.

In July 2020, Wong became one of the first batch of overseas activists wanted by Hong Kong authorities under the newly promulgated Hong Kong national security law. Wong responded by saying on his official Twitter account that he had ceased to advocate for Hong Kong independence, and that he had in fact not said anything related to that issue since the implementation of the national security law; he accused Hong Kong authorities of attempting to prosecute him retrospectively, contrary to the text of the new law itself. Germany suspended its extradition treaty with Hong Kong in response to the extradition warrant for Wong.

As of February 2025, Wong has served as Policy and Strategy Advisor of Hong Kong Watch, chairman of Berlin-based Freiheit für Hongkong e.V. and Deputy General Secretary of the European Hong Kong Diaspora Alliance.

== See also ==
- Edward Leung
