= Special Tactical Contingent =

Riot contingent unit of the Hong Kong Police Force

- 特別戰術小隊
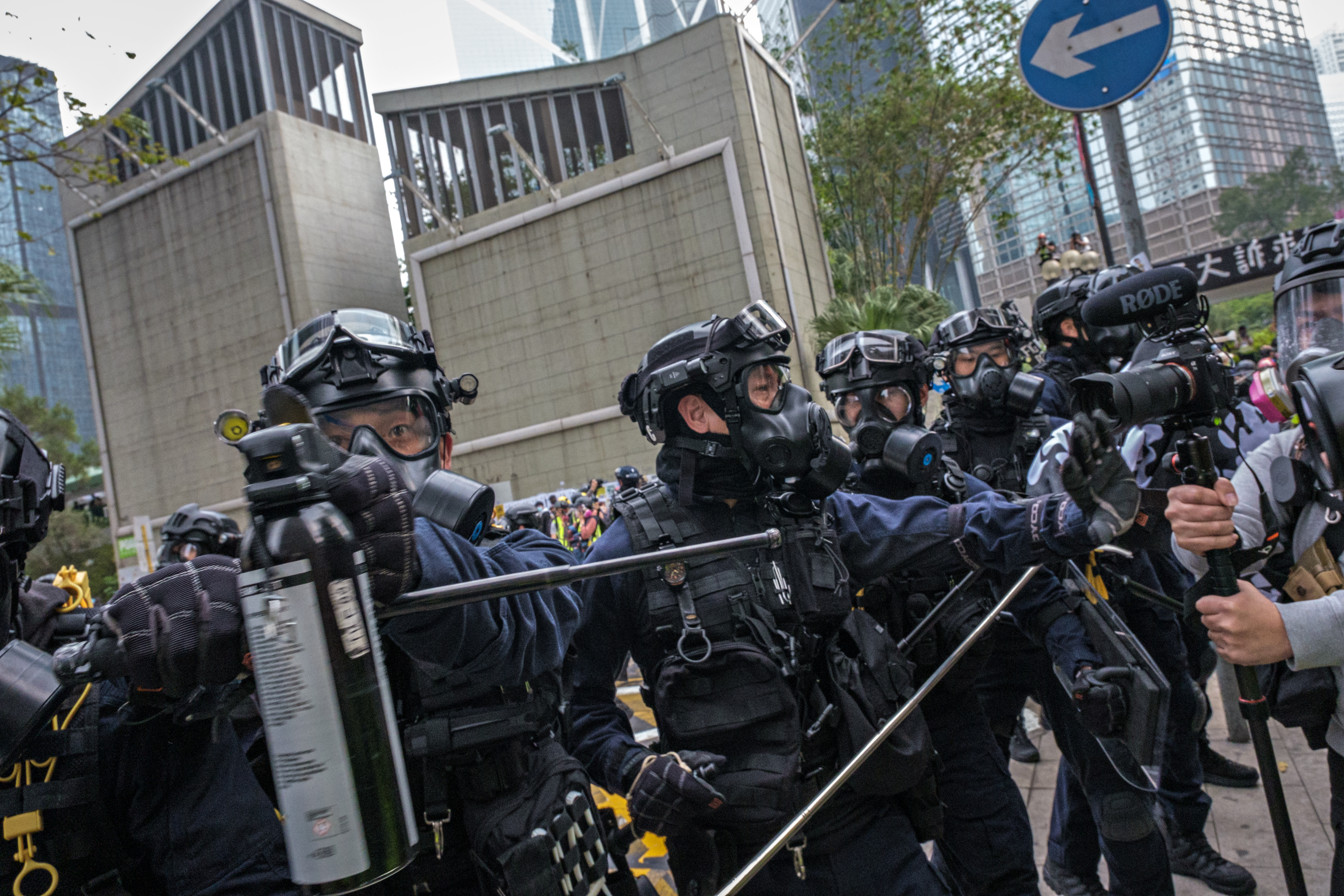
- Special Tactical Contingent Officers pointing pepper sprays at journalists during a pro-democracy protest in 2020.
- Active: September 2014 - present
- Country: Hong Kong
- Agency: Hong Kong Police Force
- Type: Riot police
- Role: Riot control
- Operations jurisdiction: Hong Kong
- Part of: Police Tactical Unit
- Common name: Special Tactical Squad; Raptors; Elite Team; Removal Team
- Abbreviation: STC

Notables
- Significant operation(s): 2014 Hong Kong protests; 2016 Mong Kok civil unrest; 2016 Anti-Interpretation Protest; 2019–20 Hong Kong protests

The Special Tactical Contingent (STC; Chinese: 特別戰術小隊), nicknamed the "Raptors" (Chinese: 速龍小隊), commonly known as the Special Tactical Squad (STS), is a specialist riot contingent of the Hong Kong Police Force under the command of the Police Tactical Unit (PTU).

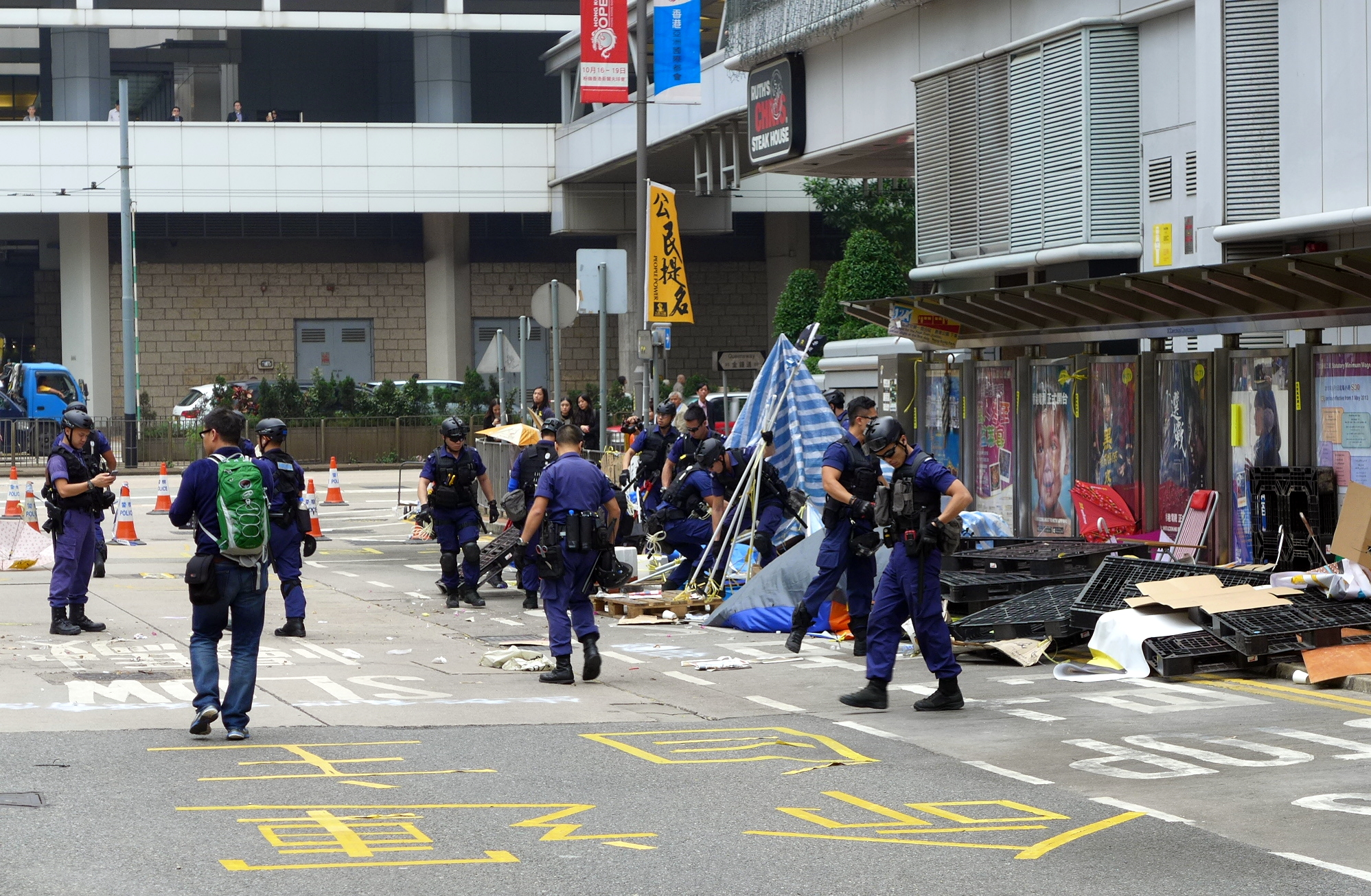
Special Tactical Contingent removes obstacles from Tamar Street in Hong Kong

== History ==
In response to the Occupy Central Movement the police established the Special Tactical Contingent in September 2014. The police required a specialist unit for barricade removal, crowd dispersal and special weapons support.

The media reported that the police had not officially named the contingent commonly known as the Raptors and that instead it was referred to by the police as the Elite Team or Removal Team.

On 1 December 2014, the media reported that the contingent had recently been officially named as the Special Tactical Squad by the head of the Police Tactical Unit; however, days later another media outlet reported that this name was used but was not official yet.

The official English name the Special Tactical Contingent, was first used by the police in a police publication in an article in Offbeat newspaper in 2016 and was used again the following year in the 2017 Police Review and in proceeding years. Despite the use of the official name from 2016, protesters and the media continued to use the name Special Tactical Squad for the contingent.

== Structure ==
The contingent is a small unit with members drawn from several permanent units to perform duties on an ad hoc basis under the command of the Police Tactical Unit.

Members are drawn from the Police Tactical Unit (PTU) Headquarters, Counter Terrorism Response Unit, Airport Security Unit, Special Duties Unit and the all-female Tango Coy. Contingent members return to their permanent unit after completing ad hoc tasks. The contingent operates in teams of five members with the team leader either the rank of Sergeant or Inspectorate.

The STC would also conduct observational and command related tasks, to ensure and review the Police Tactical Unit's use of force and tactics are appropriate, to further improve from past events.

== Operations ==
=== 2014 Umbrella Revolution ===
The name of the police operation for the protests was Operation Solarpeak.

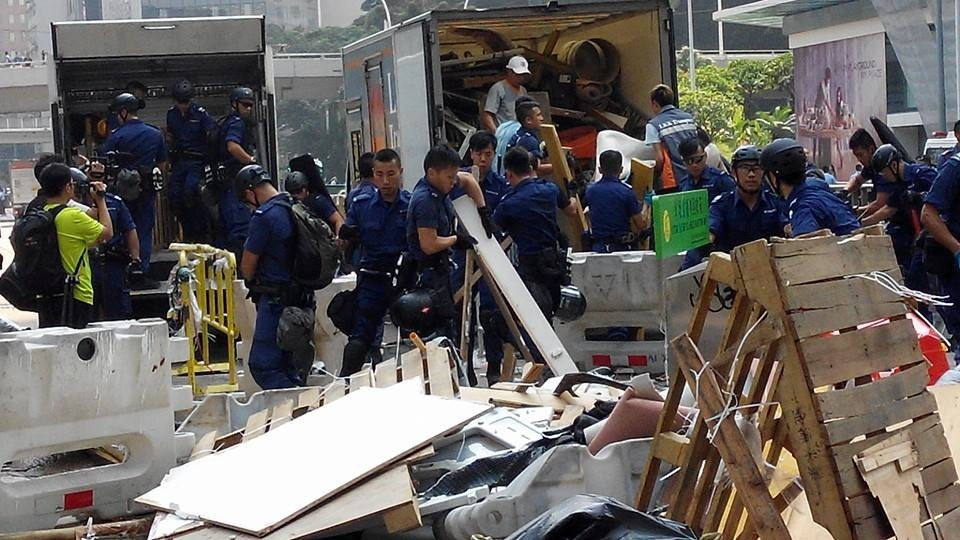
STC in Queensway rapidly removing obstacles.

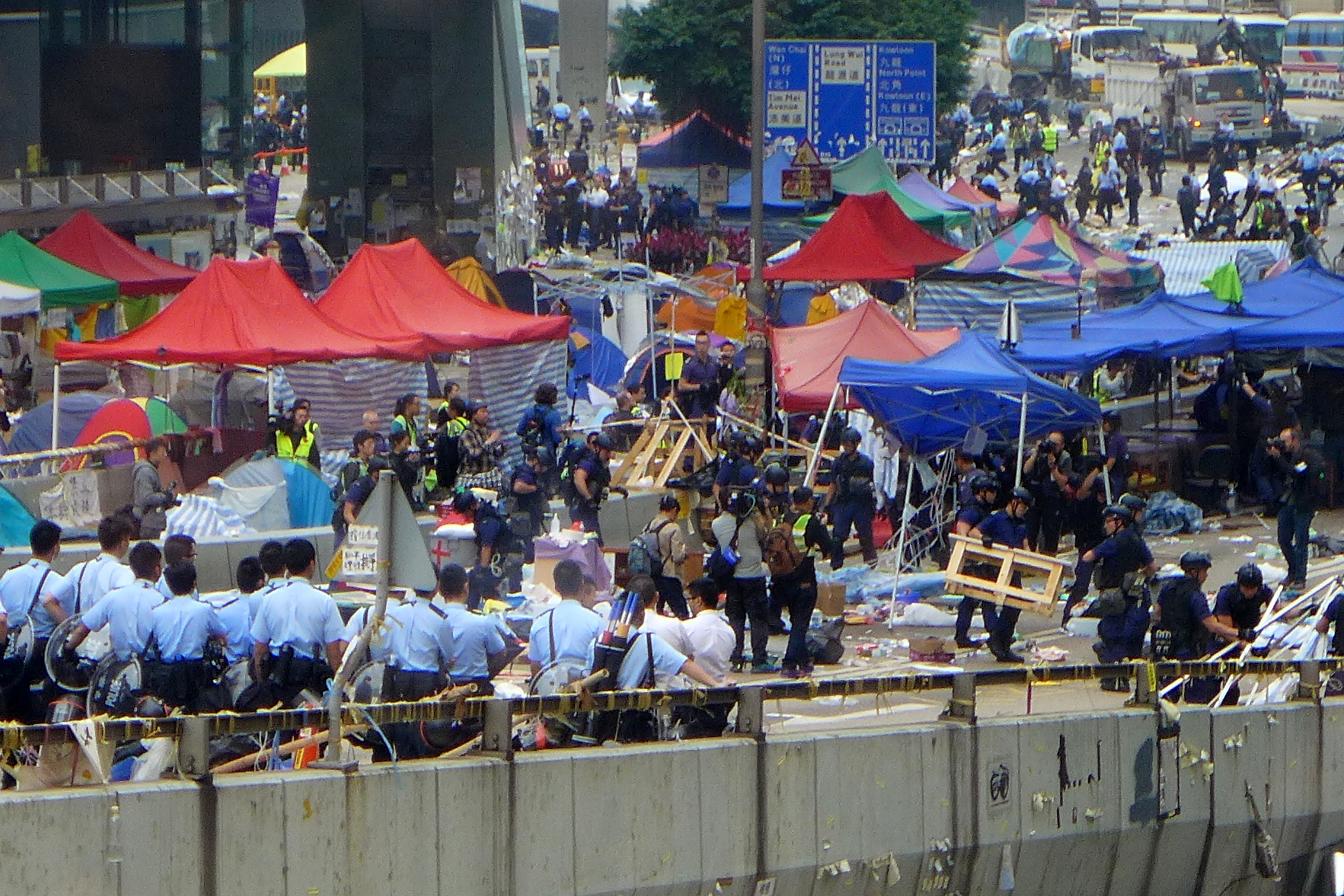
STC & PTU in Queensway rapidly removing obstacles.

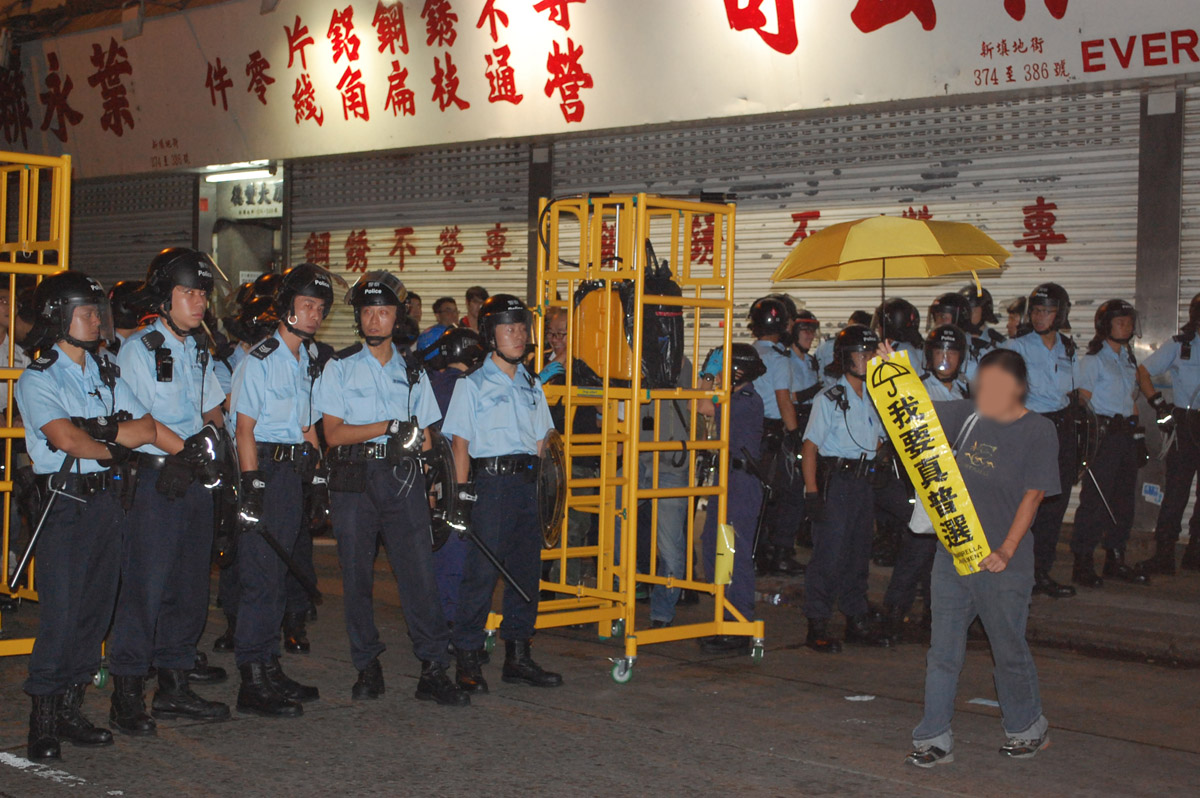
PTU creating a blockade the Mong Kok Occupied Area, while STC officers push the mobile platform.

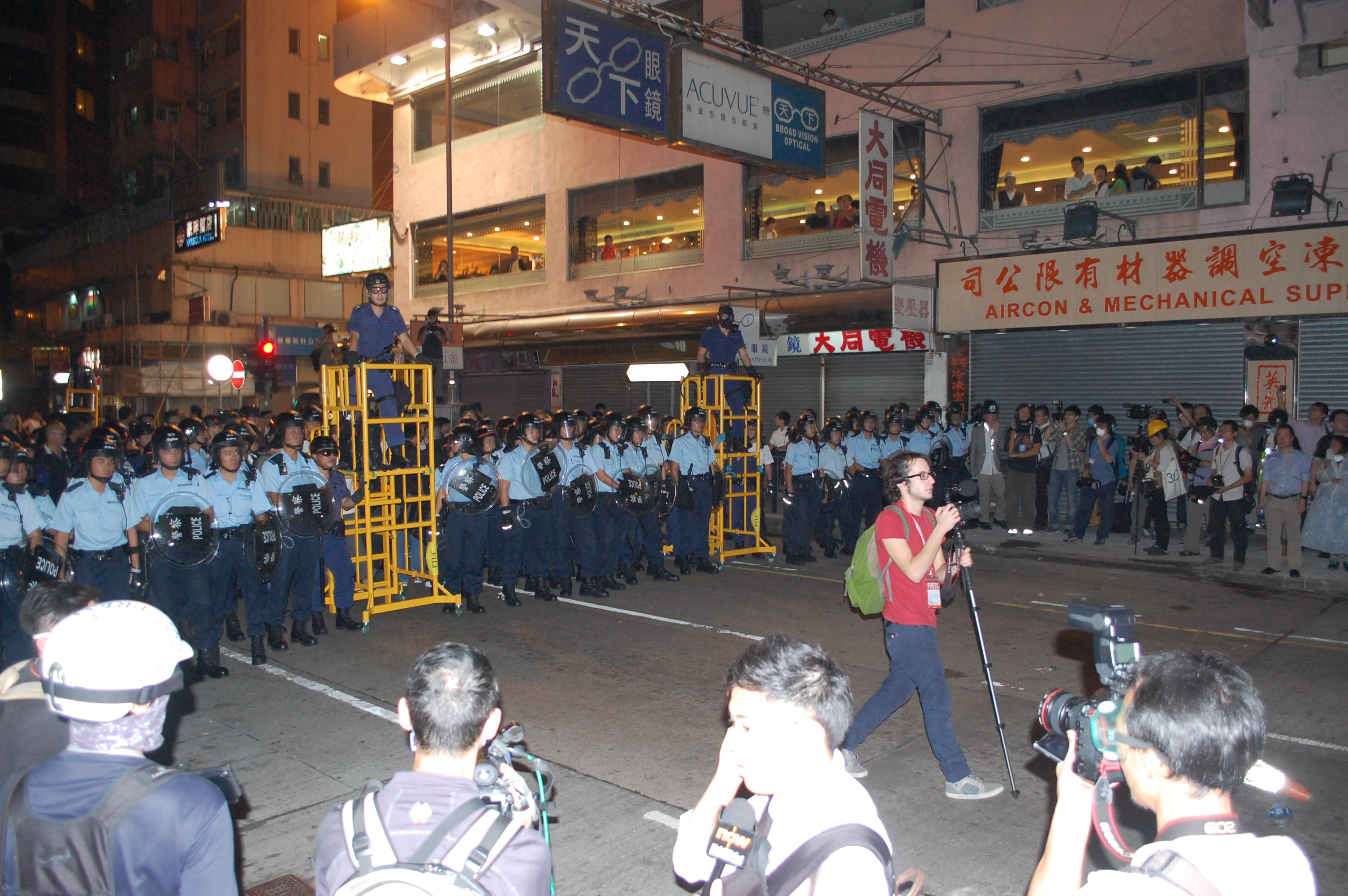
Two STC officers standing on the mobile platform.

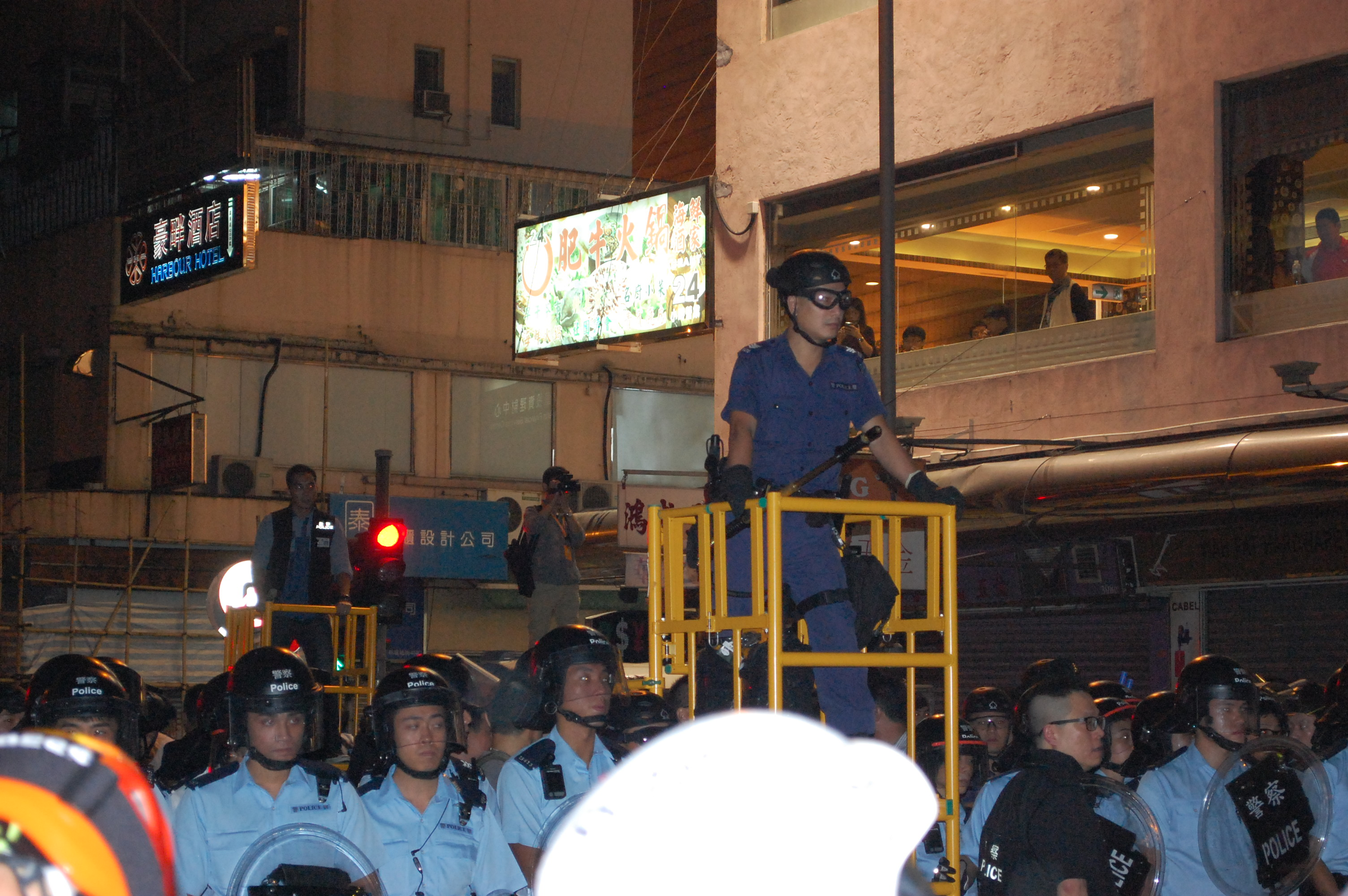
Closeup of a STC officer standing on the mobile platform.

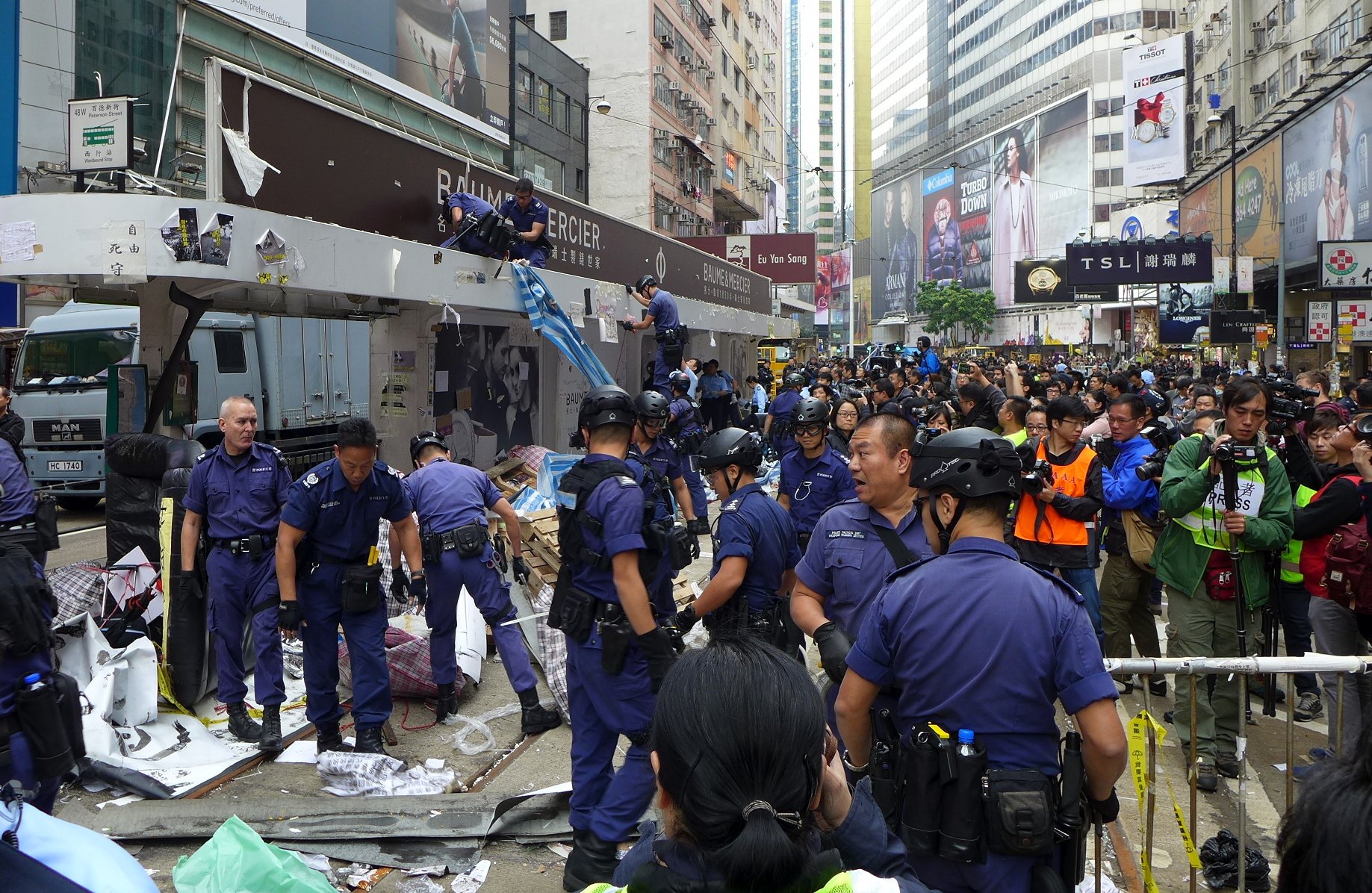
STC in Causeway Bay rapidly removing obstacles.

=== 2016 Mong Kok civil unrest ===
On 9 February evening, 2016, in an escalation of the civil unrest, protesters changed their tactics, overwhelming the Hong Kong Police Force, and the Special Tactical Contingent were deployed as a result.

They arrived at the intersection of Soy Street and Sai Yeung Choi Street South at 4:30 am, where they quickly cleared protesters. However, after 5 minutes, due to the lack of reinforcements, they were forced to retreat, with one constable injured.

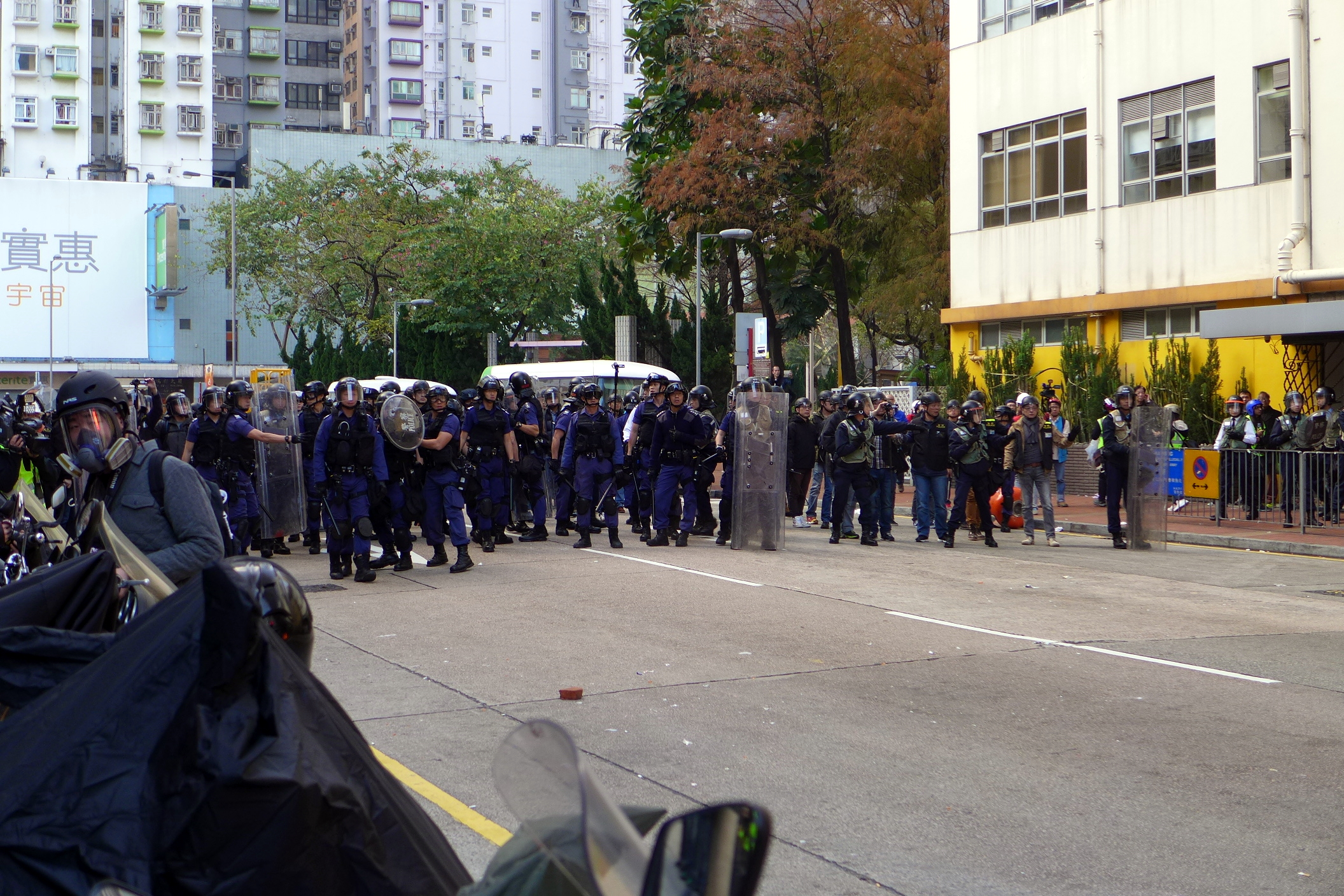
STC in Sai Yee Street creating a riot blockade.

=== 2016 Anti-Interpretation Protest ===
Protests were held from 6 to 8 November 2016 during the interpretation of the Basic Law.

=== 2019 Anti-Extradition Bill protests ===
Squads were deployed to disperse the crowds after clashes between the protesters and the police started.

During some of the protests in August, protesters threw Molotov cocktails, bricks, metal pipes etc., and the squads deployed tear gas canisters, rubber bullet, beanbag rounds to disperse them. Live-fire weapons were also deployed.

Many of the officers were accused for using excessive force during arrests and while dispersing the protesters. Most notably during the 2019 Prince Edward station attack and the siege of the Hong Kong Polytechnic University.

Apple Daily and New Tang Dynasty Television reported that SDU operators disguised as protesters provoked fights with protestors in order for them to be arrested. Newtalk reported that SDU operators disguised as protestors committed illegal acts such as setting fire on the street as part of a false flag operation.

A report by Amnesty International singled out the Special Tactical Contingent for "the worst abuses" of excessive force during the 2019–20 protests, noting that:

"Almost every arrested person interviewed described being beaten with batons and fists during their arrest, even when they posed no resistance".

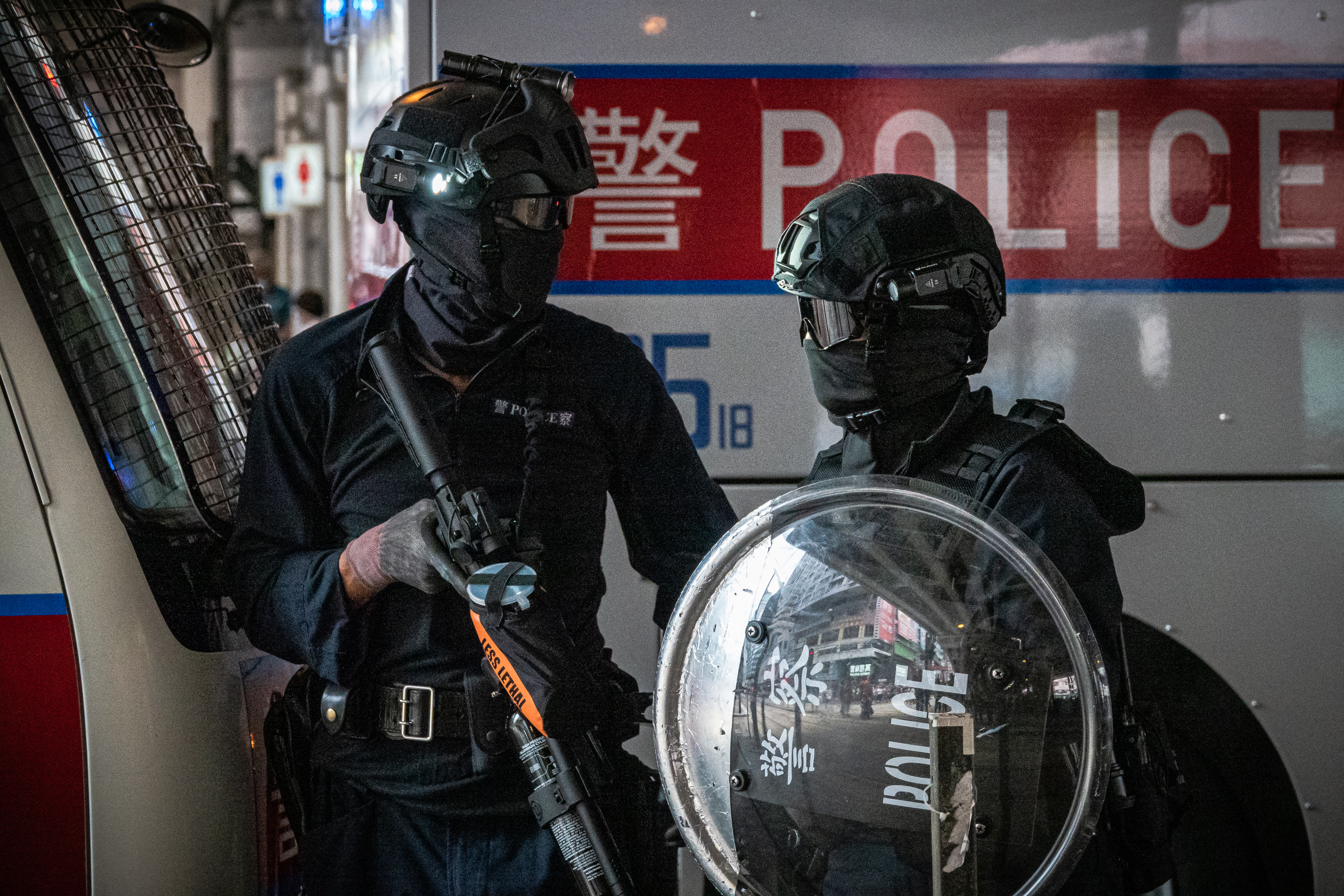
Two STC officers guarding police vehicles

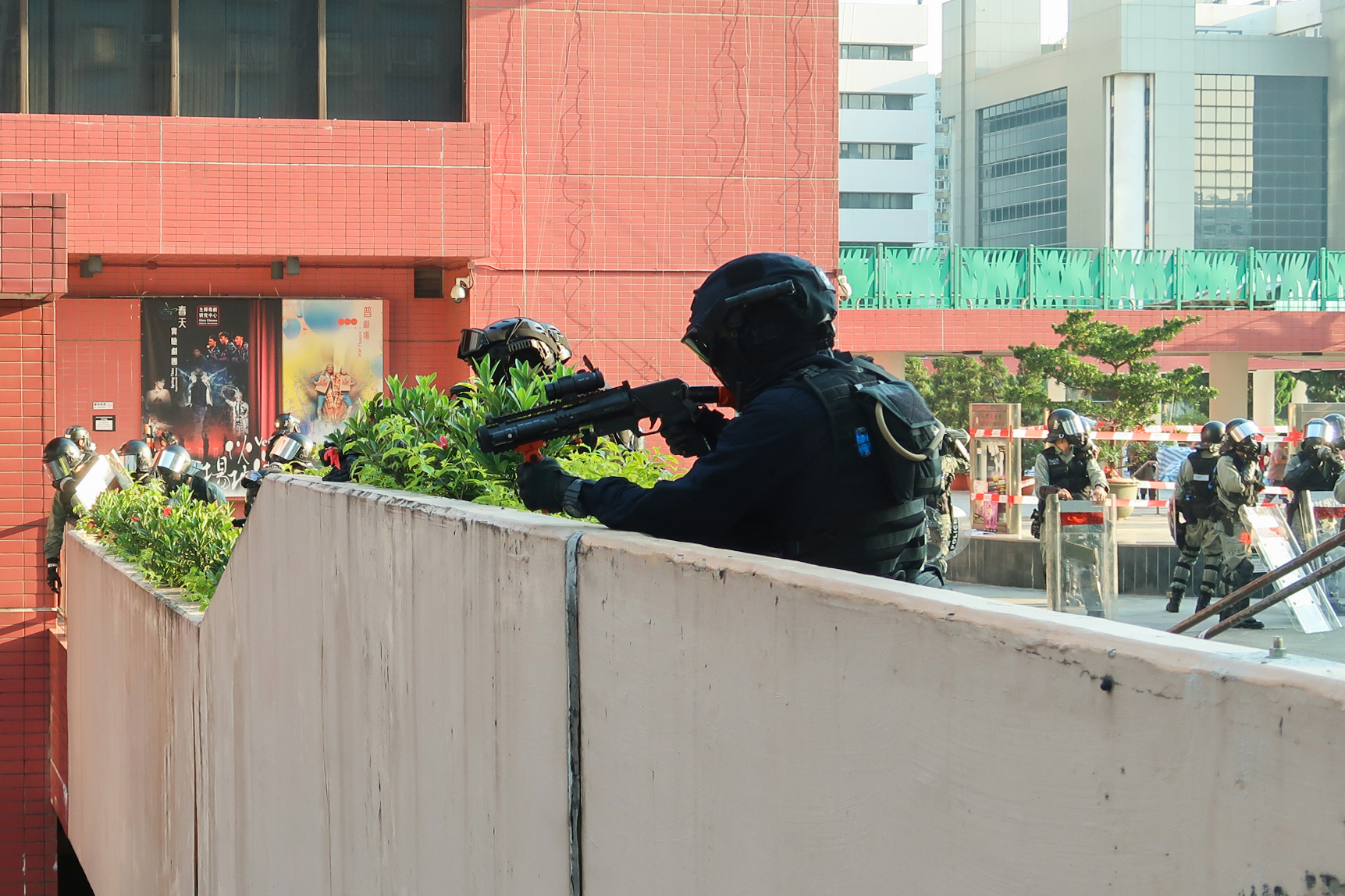
A STC officer using a less-lethal launcher

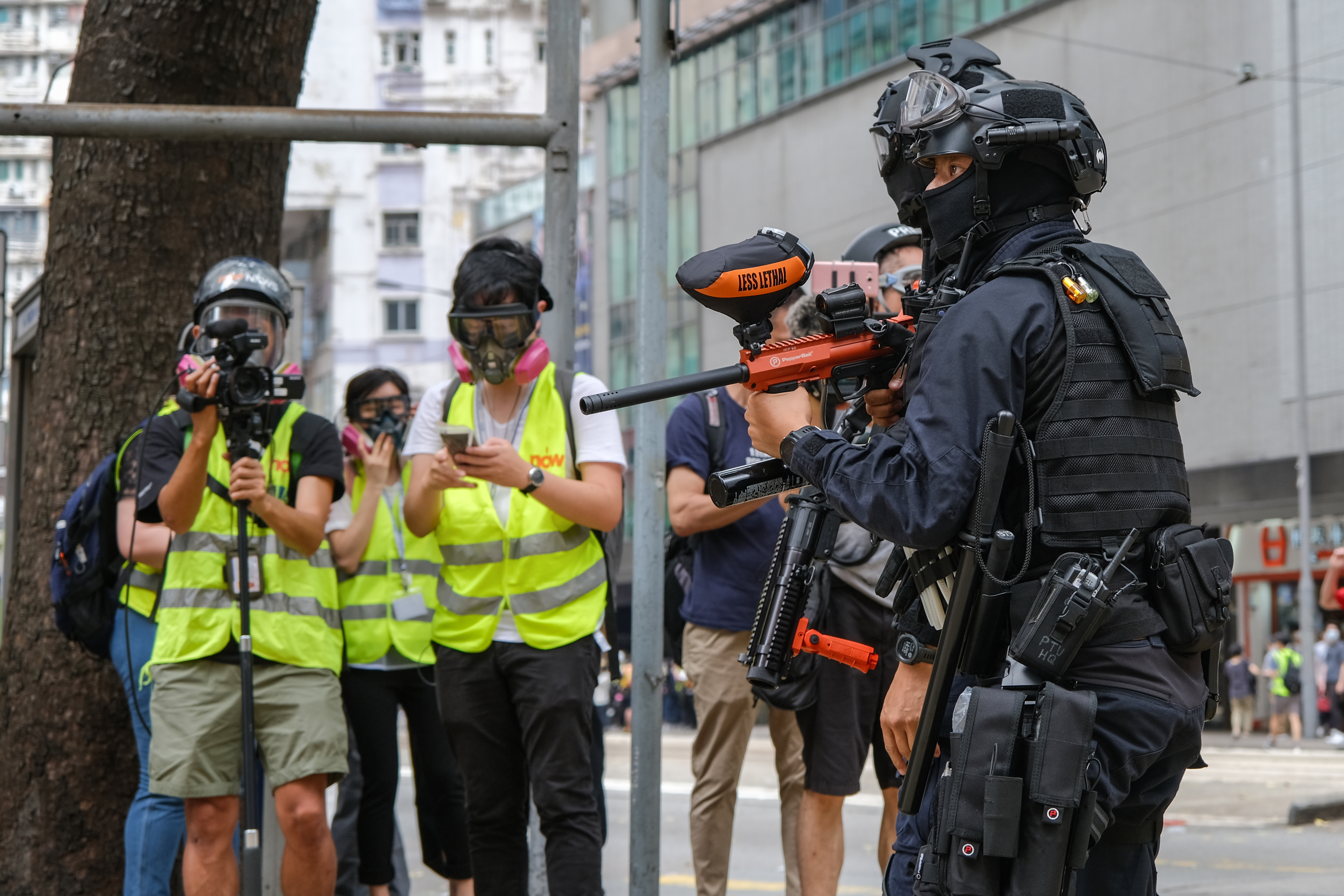
A STC officer with a less-lethal pepper gun

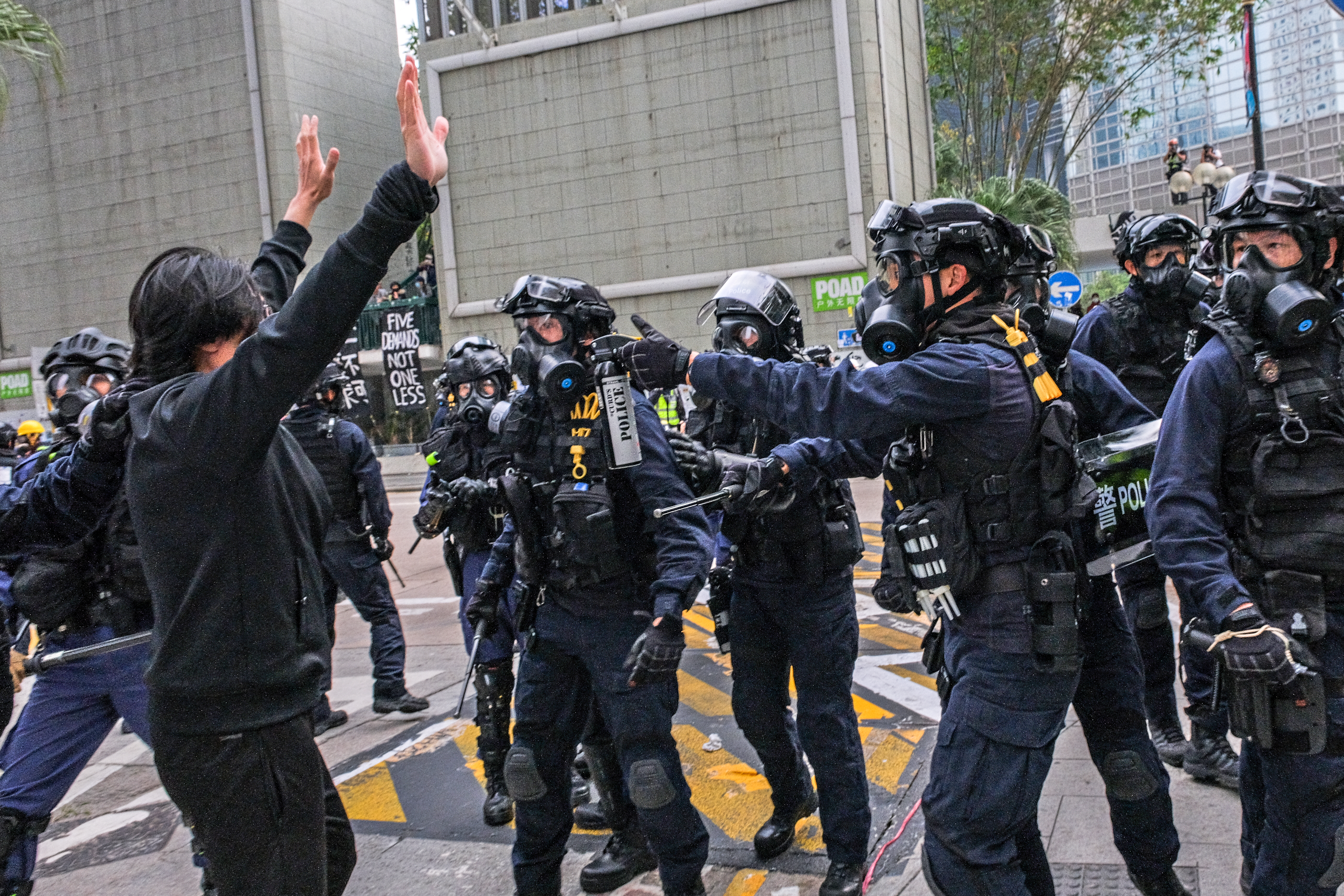
A STC officer aiming a pepper spray to a protester

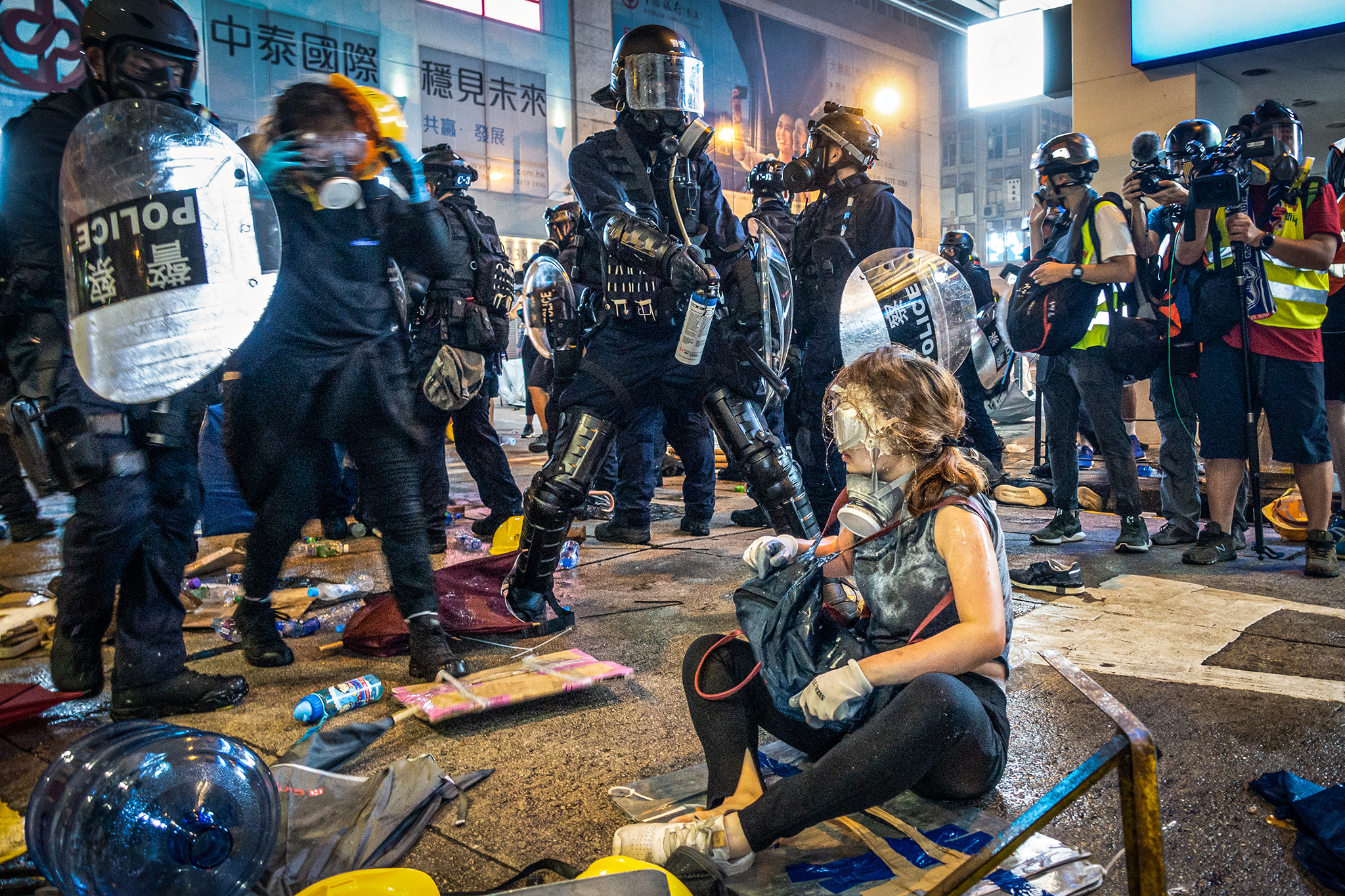
A STC officer using a pepper spray to a protester

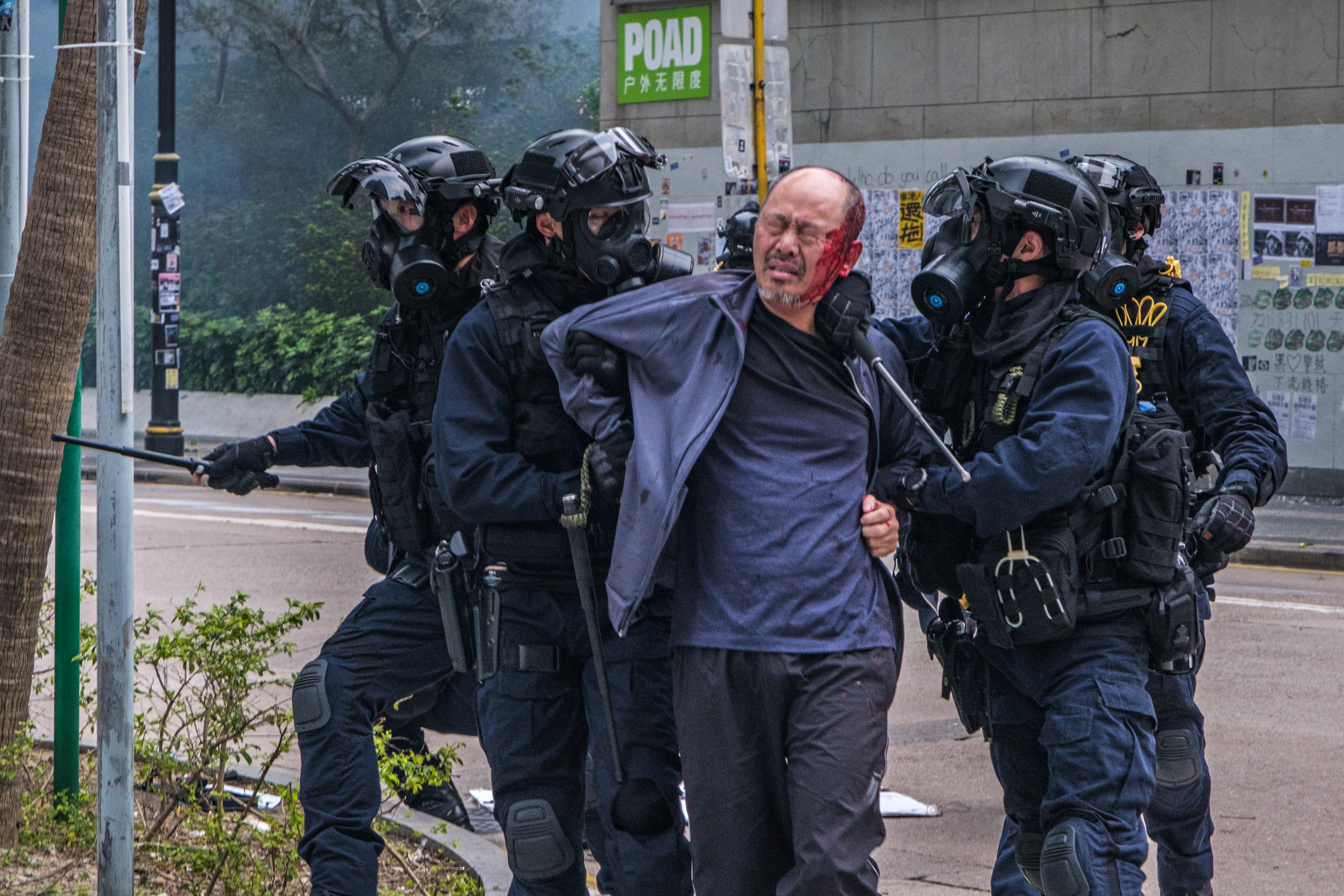
STC officers arresting a wounded protester

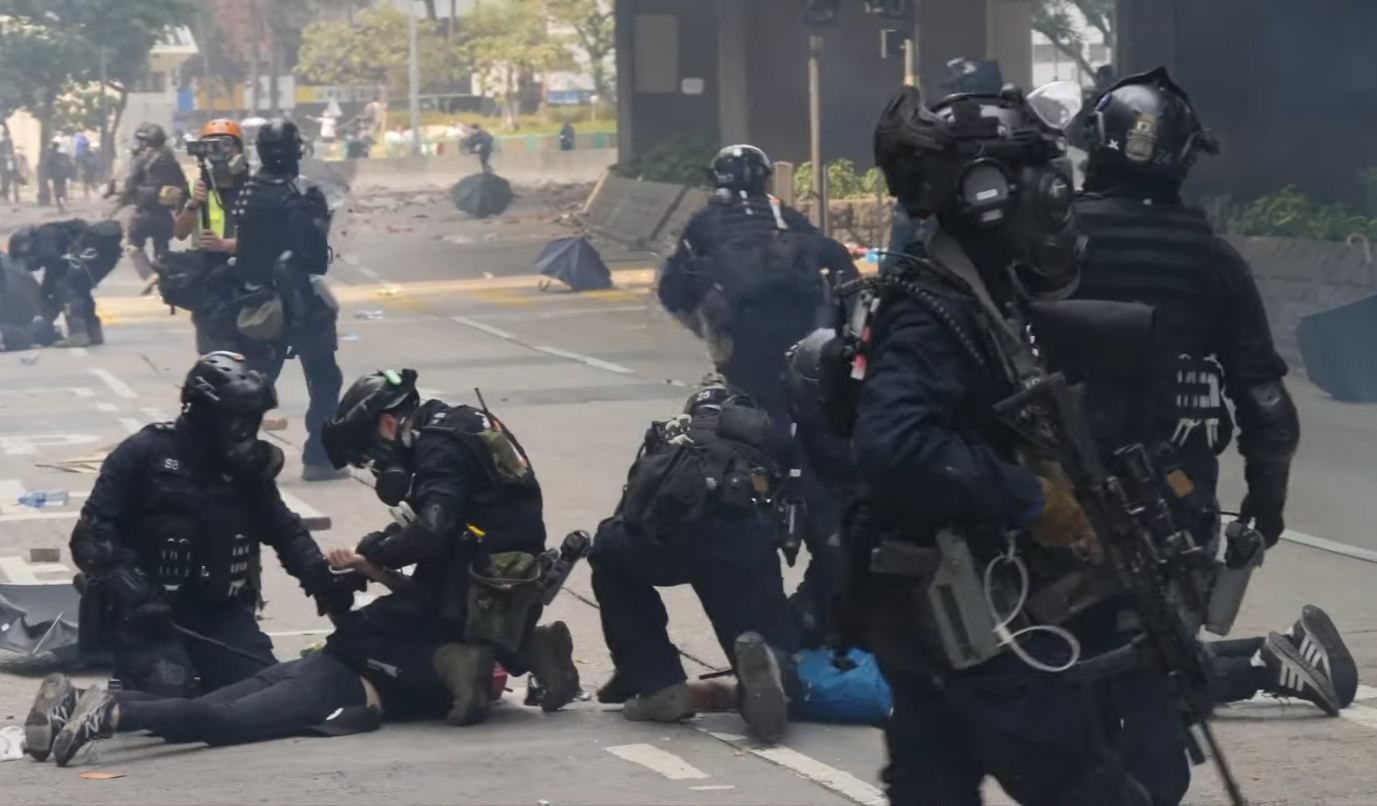
STC officers arresting two protesters

== Uniform ==
Officers initially wore a dark blue PTU uniform.

Each officer attached a team call-sign with velcro to the back of their helmet for example “3-1”. There was no Force requirement for a STC member to attach their service number or rank to their uniform although some officers did.

During the 2016 Mong Kok civil unrest, the police found that the PTU uniform was not suitable for the contingent.

A new black uniform together with protective armor was sourced from overseas in November 2016 and approved in January 2017. The new uniform was first used in operations on 9 June 2019. There was no requirement to attach their service number to their uniform although some officers attached it.

From 28 June 2019, each officer attached to their helmet, in addition to the team call-sign, a sticker with a letter known as a Alpha ID to identify individual members of the team for example letters “a” to “e” if the team consists of 5 members.

The Alpha ID was not unique to the officer and would be returned if an officer was no longer assigned to the STC and reissued to another officer.

In November 2020, the High Court found that the failure of the Commissioner of Police to establish and maintain a system to ensure that each police officer could be uniquely identified and that officers wear and prominently display a unique identification number or mark violated Article 3 of the Hong Kong Bill of Rights.

Officers attached a fluorescent stick (including yellow or red colours, depending on their team) to their helmet at night time for easier recognition by a commanding officer.

== Equipment ==
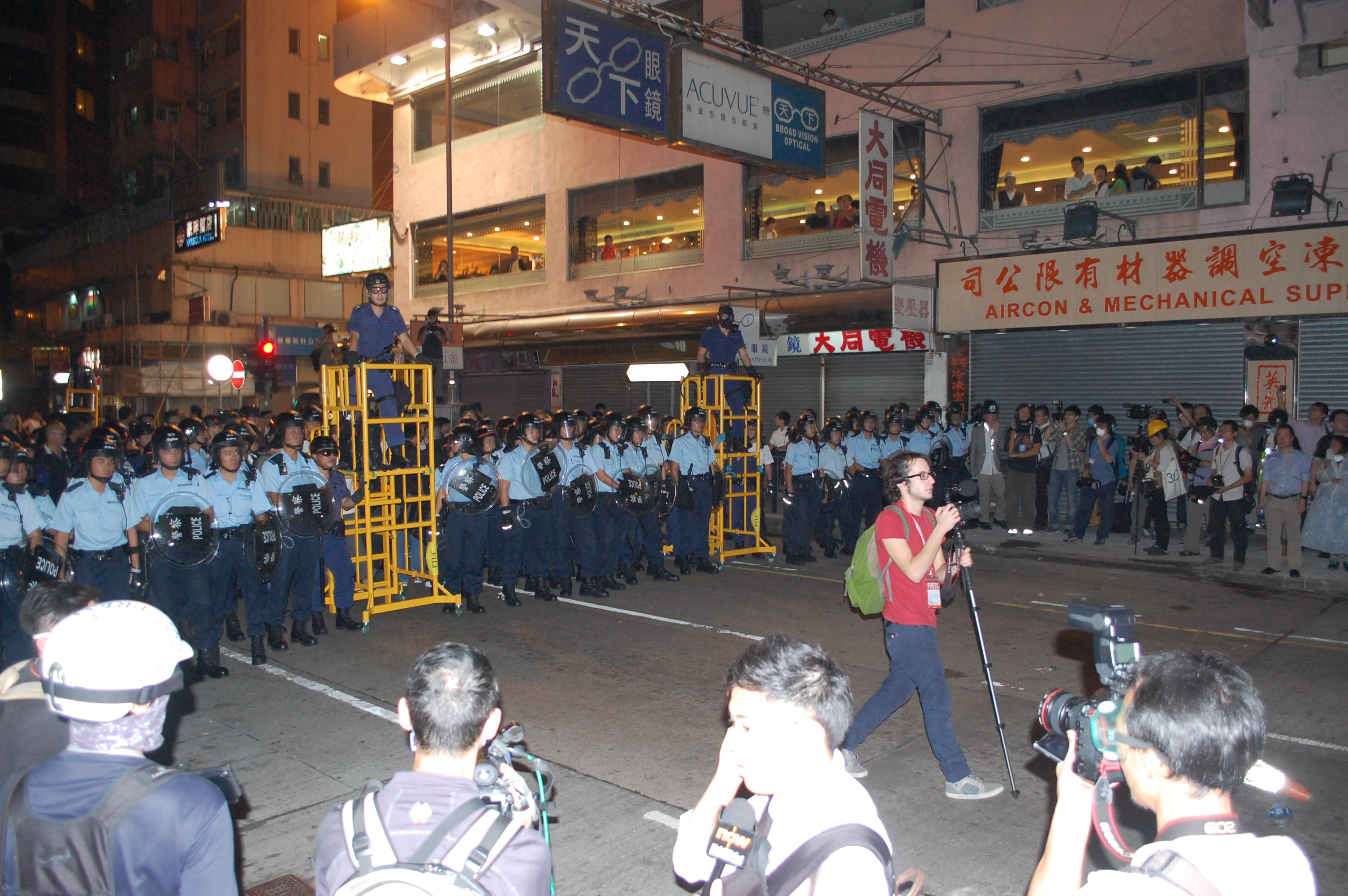
2 STC officers standing on the mobile platform. (Photo taken on 25 November, Mong Kok Reclamation Street)

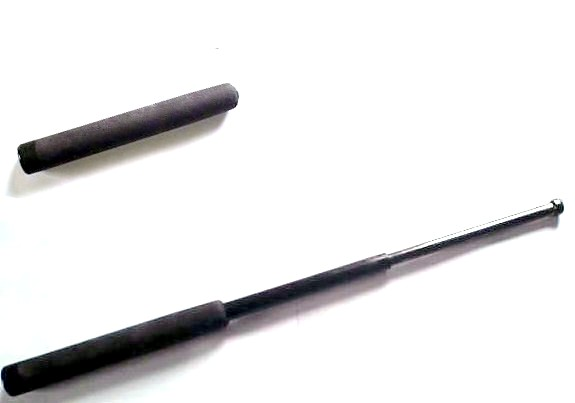
ASP 21-inch (53 cm) expandable baton in expanded and collapsed state

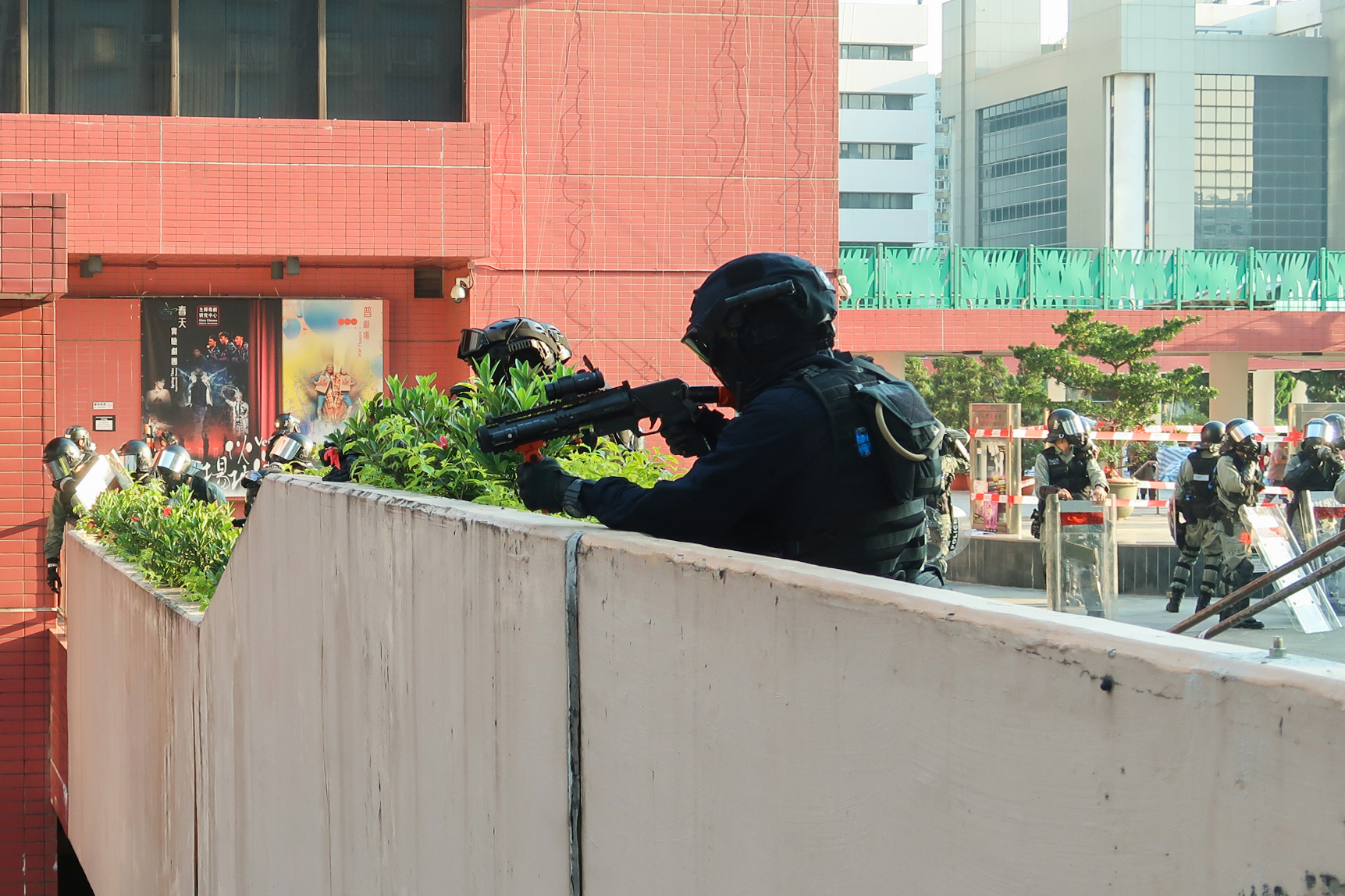
STC officers with a Sponge-grenade gun.

=== Personal gear ===
Item	Origin	Type	Notes
MSA MO 5001	France	Riot protection helmets	Issued to ordinary officers
Ops-Core FAST XP High Cut	United States	Riot protection helmets	Issued to SDU officers
Ops-Core FAST Bump	United States	Riot protection helmets	Nil
Team Wendy Exfil LTP Bump	United States	Riot protection helmets	Nil
Pro-Tec Ace	United States	Riot protection helmets	Nil
Avon SF10	United Kingdom	Gas masks	Nil
Avon FM54	United Kingdom	Gas masks	Nil
Avon FM-12	United Kingdom	Gas masks	Nil
Avon CM-12	United Kingdom	Gas masks	Nil
Avon FM53	United Kingdom	Gas masks	Used by PTU & CTRU officers
Scott FRR	United Kingdom	Gas masks	Used by SDU officers
C4 CBRN	Canada	Gas masks	Nil
Blackhawk! S.T.R.I.K.E. Omega	United States	Tactical vests	Nil
5.11 VTAC MOLLE	United States	Tactical vests	Nil
Crye Precision JPC	United States	Tactical vests	Nil
MSA Paraclete RMV	France	Tactical vests	Nil

=== Others ===
- Handcuffs
- Cable ties
- First aid kits
- Megaphone
- Wire cutters
- Electric drill
- Spinal board
- Tactical boots
- Space blanket
- Anti-cut gloves, uses 3M materials, used to carry and remove obstacles.
- Mobile Platform, 4 officers are in charge of protecting and pushing the platform, alongside 2 officers on the platform to observe, conduct forensic filming, announce, command, etc.

=== Riot control agents ===
Name	Country of origin	Type	Notes
ASP	United States	Extendable baton	21-inch model
PPCT Phoenix	United States	Extendable baton	18-inch model
Sabre MK-9	United States	Pepper spray	Hand-held sprays
CURD'S POLICE RSG 400	United States	Pepper spray	Hand-held sprays
Federal Riot Gun	United States	Grenade launcher	Used with various projectiles
Penn Arms GL-1 Compact	United States	Grenade launcher	Revealed in 2019
VKS Pepperball Launcher	United States	Grenade launcher	Used with pepper-spray projectiles
Brügger & Thomet GL-06	Switzerland	Grenade launcher	Revealed in 2019
M320 Grenade Launcher Module	Germany	Grenade launcher	Revealed in 2019
ARWEN 37	United Kingdom	Grenade launcher	Used with tear gas projectiles
OC Water Jet Pack	Unknown	Water jet pack	In the ratio of 350mL of OC Liquid to 14L of pure water, within a container, carried on the back or placed on the ground, far distance and accurate spray.
N225	United Kingdom	OC grenade	Hand-thrown grenades
KF-302-20	China	OC grenade	Hand-thrown grenades
Unknown		Stun grenade	Hand-thrown grenades
NonLethal Technologies™ MP-6M5-CS /Model CS-565 Tear Gas rounds	United States	Munition	5 rounds per projectile, able to discharge at 50–70 meters.
NonLethal Technologies™ MP-4-R3 /Model 373 Rubber Baton rounds	United States	Munition	3 rounds per projectile, able to discharge at 40–50 meters.
Norinco NF01-3 Tear Gas rounds	China	Munition	3 rounds per projectile, able to discharge at 50–70 meters

=== Weapons ===
Name	Country of origin	Type	Notes
CF98A	China	Semi-automatic pistol	Standard issue
Smith & Wesson Model 10	United States	Revolver	Standard issue
Remington 870	United States	Shotgun	Standard issue
Colt AR-15	United States	Semi-automatic rifle	Used by PTU officers
Glock 17	Austria	Semi-automatic pistol	Standard issue for SDU, CTRU and ASU operators
Heckler & Koch MP5	Germany	Submachine gun	Standard issue for SDU, CTRU and ASU operators
SIG Sauer SIG516	United States	Assault rifle	Standard issue for SDU, CTRU and ASU operators
QBZ-191	China	Assault rifle	Ceremonial use only

== See also ==
- Police Tactical Unit (Hong Kong)
- Special Duties Unit
- Dragon Slaying Brigade
