= Hong Kong Indigenous =

Hong Kong political organisation

Hong Kong Indigenous 本土民主前線
- Founded: January 2015
- Membership (2016): ~60
- Ideology: Localism (Hong Kong); Hong Kong nationalism
- Regional affiliation: Localist camp
- Colours: Blue
- Legislative Council: 0 / 90
- District Councils: 0 / 470

Hong Kong Indigenous
- Traditional Chinese: 本土民主前線
- Simplified Chinese: 本土民主前线
Transcriptions
Standard Mandarin
- Hanyu Pinyin: Běntǔ mínzhǔ qiánxiàn
Yue: Cantonese
- Yale Romanization: Bún tóu màhn jyú chìhn sin
- Jyutping: Bun^{2} tou^{2} man^{4} zyu^{2} cin^{4} sin^{3}

Hong Kong Indigenous (本土民主前線; lit. 'Local-land Democracy Front') is a localist political group established in 2015. It is known for its hardline localist stances and militant methods of protesting. It has been actively involved in protests and engaged into violent clashes with police, including in the anti-parallel trading protests and the Mong Kok unrest. Edward Leung and Ray Wong are the former convenor and key figure of the group.

== Beliefs ==
Hong Kong Indigenous states that it opposes the increased influence of mainland China and the Beijing government's involvement in Hong Kong. It opposes the increased use of standard Mandarin in Hong Kong schools instead of the native Cantonese. It also claims that the growing number of mainland migrants – due to the issuing of one-way travel permits to mainlanders over which Hong Kong has no control whatsoever – would have the effect of "diluting the ratio of local people" and depriving the locals' resources," especially in primary schools, public housing and certain jobs. It argues that a mainland "incursion" is stripping residents of their identity and rights. The group has criticised the pan-democracy camp's "gentle approach" of non-violent civil disobedience and calls for a "militant" approach by "bravery and force". The group pushes for secession from China.

== History ==
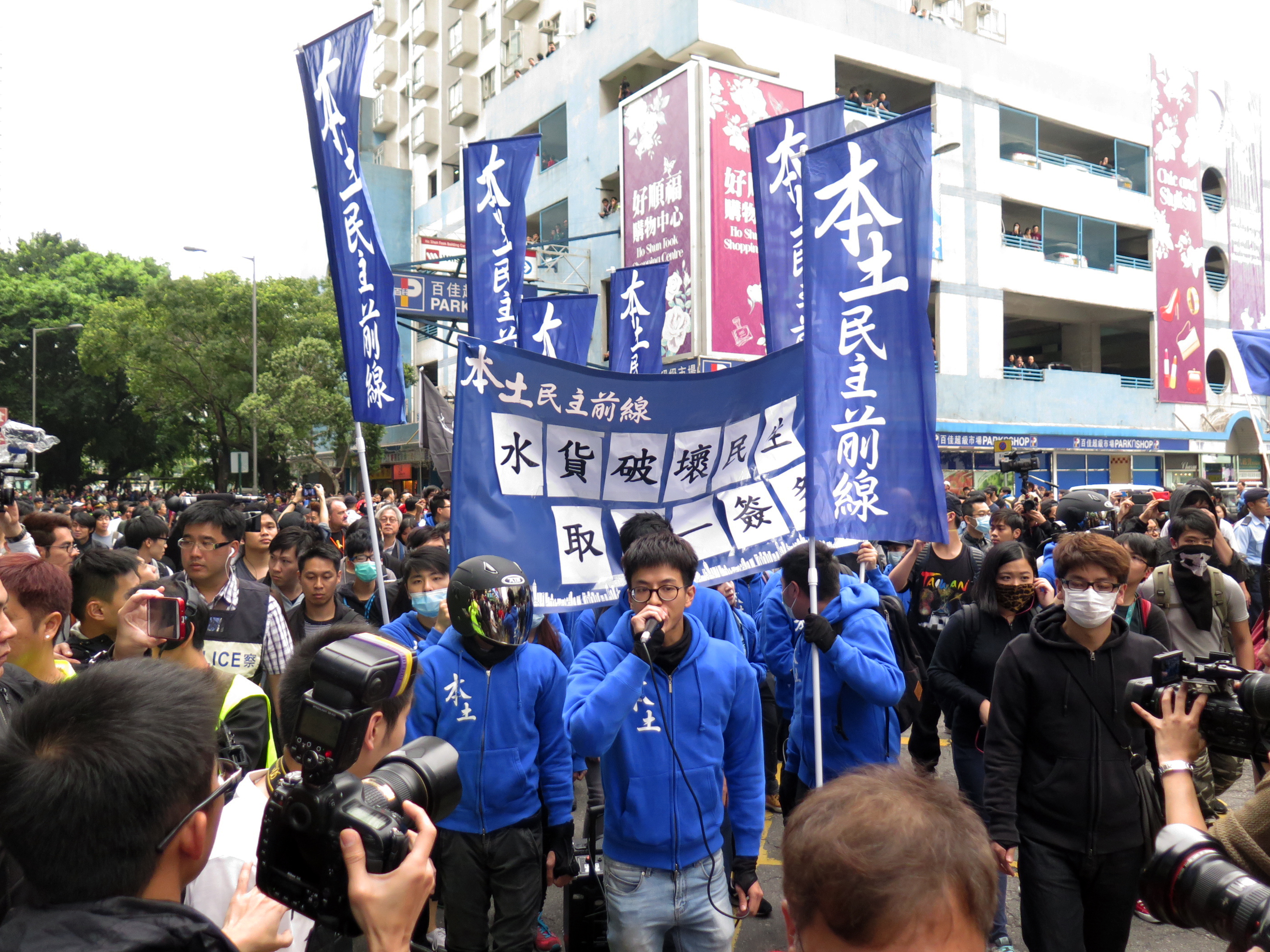
Hong Kong Indigenous at the Liberate Yuen Long protest.

Hong Kong Indigenous was set up by a group of youngsters who participated in the 2014 Hong Kong protests in January 2015. It organised anti-parallel trading protests with another nativist group Civic Passion against the growing influx of mainland Chinese shoppers engaging in parallel trading in early 2015, aggressively picketing the alleged shoppers and having clashes with the police. After the third demonstration, the central government said it would restrict Shenzhen residents to one visit a week.

In July 2015, Hong Kong Indigenous marched to the Immigration Department to demand deportation of an undocumented 12-year-old Mainland boy Siu Yau-wai, who lived in Hong Kong for nine years without identification, with other nativists including Youngspiration.

In January 2016, the group announced the candidacy of its 24 year old member Edward Leung Tin-kei for the 2016 New Territories East by-election which was triggered by the resignation of Civic Party legislator Ronny Tong. Leung received 66,524 votes, about 15 percent of the total votes, behind pan-democratic Civic Party and pro-Beijing Democratic Alliance for the Betterment and Progress of Hong Kong. The better-than-expected result was considered a big boost for the localist cause.

In February 2016, the group was actively involved in violent clashes with police in Mong Kok arising from the group's call for action to protect illegal street hawkers from a government crackdown. Spokesman and Legislative Council by-election candidate Edward Leung Tin-kei and around 20 members and volunteers of the group were arrested. Convenor Ray Wong Toi-yeung dismissed the claim that they incited the violent clashes and stated that they were only there to defend the street hawkers.

In the 2016 Legislative Council election, Edward Leung intended to run in once again New Territories East. The Electoral Affairs Commission (EAC) carried out a new election measure, requiring all candidates to sign an additional "confirmation form" in the nomination to declare their understanding of Hong Kong being an inalienable part of China as stipulated in the Basic Law of Hong Kong. Leung initially refused to sign the form but later agreed to sign the form after the court refused to immediately hear the judicial review. Leung was banned along with five other pro-independence activists after the end of the nomination period.

In November 2017, Ray Wong who was charged for instigating riot, joint incitement and inciting others to take part in an unlawful assembly failed to report to the police and return his travel documents to the court on 22 November after a judge-approved trip to Europe on condition of a HK$100,000 cash bail. The High Court issued an arrest warrant. According to pro-Beijing newspaper Wen Wei Po, Wong had absconded to the UK.

On 18 December 2017, Edward Leung announced his departure from the Hong Kong Indigenous as spokesman ahead of his trial of instigating riot among other charges.

== See also ==
- Localism in Hong Kong
- Hong Kong National Party
- Youngspiration
