= Michael Chugani =

Hong Kong journalist

- Traditional Chinese: 褚簡寧
- Simplified Chinese: 褚简宁
Transcriptions
Standard Mandarin
- Hanyu Pinyin: Chǔ Jiǎnníng
Yue: Cantonese
- Jyutping: cyu2 gaan2 ning4

Michael Chugani (Chinese: 褚簡寧) is a Hong Kong journalist. He was born in Hong Kong and had his childhood there.

He wrote columns for the South China Morning Post (SCMP) and the Hong Kong Economic Journal (HKEJ), and he hosted News Watch English and Straight Talk on TVB. In April 2021 he resigned from all of those programmes.

His elder brother Mohan Chugani (Chinese: 毛漢) is currently vice president and previously the president of the India Association Hong Kong. Mohan was involved in the water cannon incident at Kowloon Mosque during the protests in 2019.
