= Holden Chow =

Hong Kong politician

The Honourable Holden Chow Ho-ding
- 周浩鼎
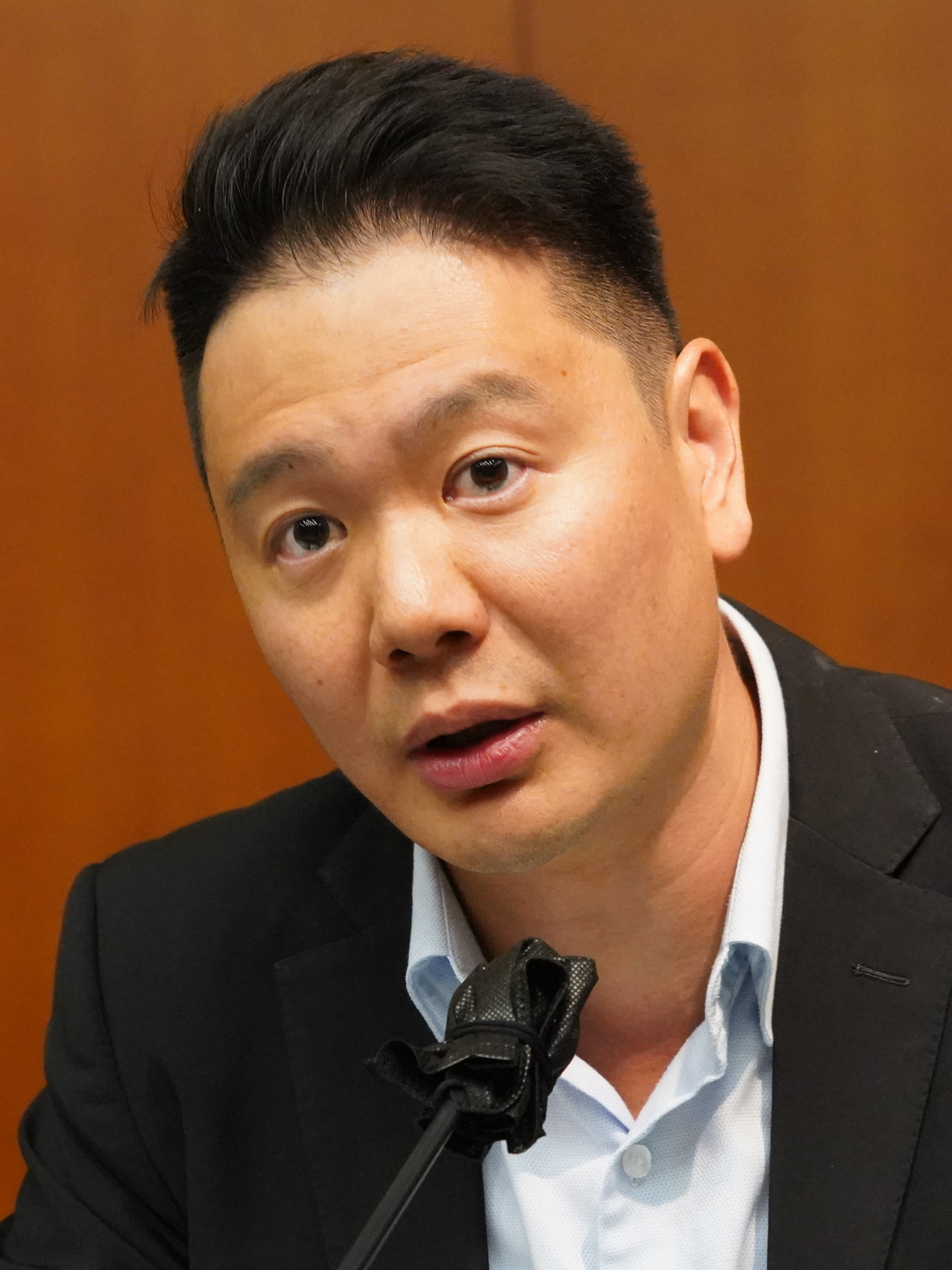
- Chow in 2024

Member of the Legislative Council
- Incumbent
- Assumed office 1 January 2022
- Preceded by: New constituency
- Constituency: New Territories North West
- In office 1 October 2016 – 31 December 2021
- Preceded by: Chan Yuen-han
- Succeeded by: Constituency abolished
- Constituency: District Council (Second)

Vice-Chairman of the Democratic Alliance for the Betterment and Progress of Hong Kong
- Incumbent
- Assumed office 17 April 2015
- Chairman: Starry Lee
- Preceded by: Ann Chiang; Starry Lee

Member of the Islands District Council
- In office 1 January 2012 – 31 December 2015
- Constituency: Appointed
- In office 1 January 2016 – 31 December 2019
- Preceded by: Chau Chuen-heung
- Succeeded by: Wong Chun-yeung
- Constituency: Tung Chung South

Personal details
- Born: 7 June 1979 (age 47) British Hong Kong
- Party: Democratic Alliance for the Betterment and Progress of Hong Kong
- Education: London School of Economics; University of Hong Kong
- Occupation: Solicitor

Holden Chow
- Chinese: 周浩鼎
Transcriptions
Standard Mandarin
- Hanyu Pinyin: Zhōu Hàodǐng
Yue: Cantonese
- Yale Romanization: Jāu Houh díng
- Jyutping: Zau^{1} Hou^{6} ding^{2}

Holden Chow Ho-ding (Chinese: 周浩鼎; born 7 June 1979) is a Hong Kong solicitor and politician. He is the vice-chairman of the Democratic Alliance for the Betterment and Progress of Hong Kong (DAB), the largest pro-Beijing party in Hong Kong, and a former chairman of Young DAB, its youth wing. He was elected to the Legislative Council of Hong Kong in 2016, through the District Council (Second) "super seat". He was re-elected in 2021 through the New Territories North West geographical constituency. He was re-elected in 2025 through the New Territories North West geographical constituency with 42,347 votes.

== Education and early political career ==
Chow was born in Hong Kong on 7 June 1979 and studied economics at the London School of Economics and Political Science in Britain after finishing Secondary 5 in Hong Kong and an English boarding school. After returning to Hong Kong, he became a solicitor with Rita Law & Co.

In 2004, Chow joined the Democratic Alliance for the Betterment of Hong Kong (DAB), the largest Beijing-loyalist party in Hong Kong. He became the chairman of Young DAB, the youth branch of party and a member of the party's executive committee in 2009. In April 2015 when chairman Tam Yiu-chung retired, Chow was elected vice-chairman along with new chairwoman Starry Lee.

Chow was also an observer on the Independent Police Complaints Council from 2010 to 2014 and an appointed member of the Equal Opportunities Commission from 2013 and was re-appointed in 2015 and 2017. In 2012, he was appointed to the Islands District Council and started working for New World Development as a legal counsel. He often participated in RTHK's weekly talk show City Forum and founded Hong Kong Association of Young Commentators in 2012.

In the 2015 District Council election, when all appointed seats were abolished, he replaced veteran DAB district councillor Chau Chuen-heung to run in the Tung Chung South constituency on Islands District Council. He received 2,161 votes and successfully won the seat for DAB.

== Legislative Council bids ==
In February 2016, he stood unsuccessfully in the 2016 New Territories East by-election. Representing not only his party but the entire mainstream pro-Beijing camp, he placed second behind the Civic Party's Alvin Yeung, receiving 150,329 votes, 10,551 fewer than his rival.

Chow stood again in the September general election, in which led one of the two DAB's tickets in the territory-wide District Council (Second) "super seat" alongside chairwoman Starry Lee. He received 264,339 votes, 13.84 percent of the vote share and was elected to the Legislative Council of Hong Kong in the fourth place out of five seats, ousting another veteran pro-Beijing politician, Wong Kwok-hing of the Hong Kong Federation of Trade Unions (FTU).

== Legislative Councillor ==
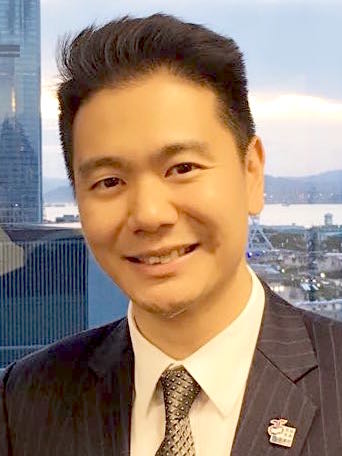
Chow in Legislative Council Complex

As the vice-chairman of the Legislative Council select committee to enquire as to the recipient of HK$50 million, Chow was involved in a scandal relating to Chief Executive Leung Chun-ying and Australian engineering firm UGL. It was found that a "CEO-CE" computer belonging to Leung's office had made 47 edits to documents that Chow presented to the select committee regarding the scope of the select committee's investigation on 15 May 2017.

This behind-the-scenes discussion between Leung and Chow was condemned by the pro-democracy camp, and led to some filing complaints to the Independent Commission Against Corruption (ICAC). Pro-democrats also demanded that Chow resign from the select committee as he had lost credibility, and considered a motion to censure Chow in the Legislative Council House Committee. They warned that the legislature's independence was under threat, as Democratic Party legislator Andrew Wan said the case reflected "the executive branch's unprecedented meddling with a LegCo probe". Chow apologised for his "lack of political sensitivity" in not informing the select committee of Leung's "personal input", but he denied any wrongdoing in discussing the matter with Leung in private.

On 19 May 2017, Chow resigned from the select committee "hoping to calm the political storm", whilst continuing to maintain that he had not done anything wrong.

In December 2022, when Chan Wing-kwong was asked a question about his goals in the Legislative Council, Chow answered for Chan, stating "He has... his expertise in Chinese medicine, and of course going forward he would put a lot of effort in promoting and enhancing the entire industry and the use of Chinese medicine."

== Political views ==
Chow often criticises the pan-democracy camp, questioning whether someone who truly loved China would demand an end to one-party rule, as the Beijing government required the Chief Executive candidate to love China and love Hong Kong and wanted to exclude the pan-democrats. He identifies as a "patriot" and opposes calls for Hong Kong independence or self-determination.

Chow challenged Jimmy Lai, the boss of the pro-democracy Next Media and supporter of the pro-democracy Occupy Central, for meeting United States Deputy Secretary of Defense Paul Wolfowitz. He also criticised a call for Hong Kong's independence from China as irresponsible.

Chow claimed that sentences against pro-democracy protestors have been too light, and said that there should be a panel to review sentencing guidelines. Chief Justice Andrew Cheung rejected that notion, said that the judiciary must not bow to political pressure, and that "Never mind what people will say about your decision, you just decide the case regardless according to the law, facts, evidence, argument."

Chow has expressed prejudice against Hong Kong's ethnic minorities by supporting a crackdown on the refugee population in Hong Kong based on unverified claims that refugees are responsible for crimes in the area. Access to Information requests from Justice Centre Hong Kong have debunked these fears as not being based upon any measurable increase in crime.

During the 2016 Hong Kong Legislative Council election, Chow's campaign was vocal in its opposition to Hong Kong independence and same-sex marriage. His re-appointment to the Equal Opportunities Commission in 2017 was protested by civil groups and pro-democracy politicians for Chow's anti-gay rights remarks. Previously Chow signed a joint statement urging the government to appeal a court's ruling of granting welfare benefits to a gay civil servant for his husband. He urged his supporters to voice their opposition to the legalisation of same-sex marriage and protect "traditional family values".

In February 2021, Chow insisted that universities in Hong Kong should be mandated to hold a weekly flag-raising ceremony of the PRC flag. Chow has also pushed for patriotic education in Hong Kong, though Chow himself did his undergraduate degree outside of Hong Kong, in London.

In March 2021, Apple Daily reported that Chow had asked for an investigation into Department of Justice prosecutor William Wong, who earlier had asked coworkers to join him in an annual vigil to remember victims of the 1989 Tiananmen Square protests and massacre. After Wong was suspended, Chow supported his suspension and said that the justice department was "putting things right".

Also in March 2021, Chow asked Kevin Yeung if the Education Bureau could suspend teachers if they were suspected of participating in unlawful assemblies but not yet convicted of crimes.

In March 2021, Chow also expressed his support for cotton from Xinjiang, after several companies stopped purchasing the cotton due to concerns about human rights violations. Chow claimed that he would not buy products from H&M anymore, and that it "utterly stupid for companies to join a political boycott".

In April 2021, Chow said that the pro-democracy Confederation of Trade Unions was showing private screenings of documentaries of the 2019-20 Hong Kong protests, and that by doing so, they were "promoting terrorism" and violating the national security law. In response, the CTU's secretary-general said the allegations were meaningless and that Chow and others "have been launching a cultural revolution to criticise people holding different political opinions".

In October 2021, Chow and fellow lawmaker Starry Lee were criticized by the mother of Amber Poon, claiming that Lee and Chow were "vanishing" after holding a press conference in 2019 with her, to push forward the 2019 Hong Kong extradition bill.

In April 2022, after YouTube suspended John Lee's campaign account, Chow claimed that it was interference by foreign forces in Hong Kong, and that it could stop the polls from being fair. Lee was the sole candidate in the election.

In August 2022, after Nancy Pelosi visited Taiwan, Chow said "This is a blatant act to infringe Chinese sovereignty and Chinese territorial integrity. The US government has gone back on their promise on the one-China principle."

In November 2022, Chow said that Jimmy Lai should not be allowed to use a UK lawyer, and said that the Hong Kong courts had ignored the importance of national security by rejecting the government's requests to disallow the UK lawyer.

In August 2023, he called on the Hong Kong justice department to continue to try to ban the song Glory to Hong Kong, after a judge ruled against a proposed ban by the government.

In September 2023, Chow suggested cutting stamp duties when buyers purchase a second home from 15% to 6%, a stamp duty meant to reduce speculation and increases in home prices.

In November 2023, Chow said that the government should increase education to "defend traditional family values," saying that the 2023 Gay Games would "shake the core family values of society."

On 10 Sept 2025, 71 of Hong Kong's 89 legislators voted against the same sex union bill, Holden Chow is one of them against the bill.

Holden Chow, the vice chair of the city's largest pro-Beijing party （i.e. the pro-establishment Democratic Alliance for the Betterment and Progress of Hong Kong）, had said that enacting the bill could “result in dire consequences” for traditional Chinese family values.

Holden Chow, also said that the authorities should deal with issues like after-death arrangements with specific administrative measures, rather than legal recognition. He described the bill as a de facto recognition of same-sex marriage, which risked “opening a Pandora’s box” of related “issues,” such as same-sex adoptions.

== See also ==
- Leung Chun-ying–UGL agreement
- LGBT rights in Hong Kong

Party political offices
Preceded by Horace Cheung	Chairman of Young Democratic Alliance for the Betterment and Progress of Hong Kong; 2009–2015	Succeeded by Frankie Ngan
Preceded by Ann Chiang; Starry Lee	Vice-Chairman of Democratic Alliance for the Betterment and Progress of Hong Kong; 2015–present	Incumbent
Political offices
Preceded by Chau Chuen-heung	Member of the Islands District Council; Representative for Tung Chung South; 2016–2019	Succeeded by Wong Chun-yeung
Legislative Council of Hong Kong
Preceded by Chan Yuen-han	Member of Legislative Council; Representative for District Council (Second); 2016–2021	Constituency abolished
New constituency	Member of Legislative Council; Representative for New Territories North West; 2022–present	Incumbent
Order of precedence
Preceded by Lam Cheuk-ting; Member of the Legislative Council	Hong Kong order of precedence Member of the Legislative Council	Succeeded by Shiu Ka-fai; Member of the Legislative Council
