= Hong Kong protests against mainlandisation =

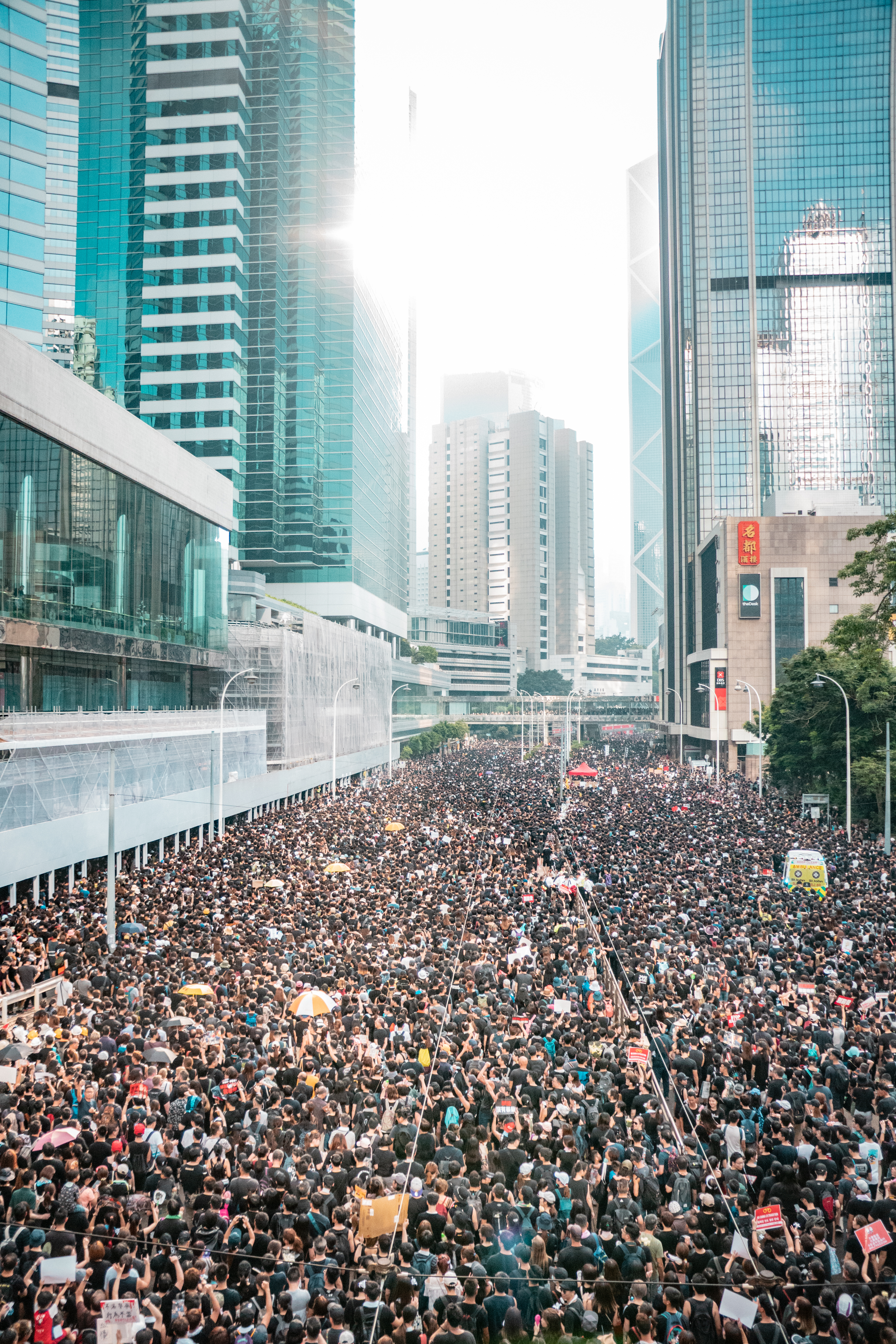
16 June 2019 demonstration, at Justice Drive, capturing Queensway, Admiralty during the 2019–2020 Hong Kong protests

Hong Kong protests against mainlandisation are a set of political and social movements prevalent in the 2010s in Hong Kong. Driven by fears of cultural erosion, political changes, and the slow pace of democratisation, the protests culminated in the 2019–2020 Hong Kong protests, which ended following the enactment of the Hong Kong national security law.

== Background ==
=== Political history of Hong Kong ===
Hong Kong was originally ruled by Qing dynasty. During the First Opium War, Hong Kong was occupied by the British Army. The Qing government ceded the island to the British Empire in 1842, when the Treaty of Nanking was signed. In 1860, after the Second Opium War, the colonial territory was expanded to include the Kowloon Peninsula. In 1898, the Convention for the Extension of Hong Kong Territory was signed to lease the New Territories. From 1941 to 1945, it was occupied by the Japanese Empire.

After the proclamation of the People's Republic of China which established the People's Republic of China (PRC) in mainland China, Hong Kong remained a British colony. The colony maintained different political systems, greater press freedoms, and a culture influenced by its colonial history. In 1972, after the change of the Chinese seat in the United Nations, the PRC joined the United Nations and gained political influence. In 1984, the Chinese and the UK governments signed the Sino-British Joint Declaration. This laid out the terms for the transfer of sovereignty of Hong Kong from the United Kingdom to the PRC. The transfer concluded with a special handover ceremony on 1 July 1997.

After this transfer, Hong Kong became a Special Administrative Region of China, which was not subject to the same laws or restrictions of the rest of the country. The Basic Law of Hong Kong, a national law of China that serves as the organic law for the region, was composed to implement Annex I of the 1984 Sino-British Joint Declaration. Its guarantees aimed to maintain Hong Kong's economic, political, and legal models after the transfer, and develop its political system with a goal of democratic government.

=== Rise of Localism ===
After 1997, Hong Kong experienced problems integrating with mainland China over economic, cultural, and political issues. On the economic side, the Hong Kong government pushed for several controversial policies, such as the Individual Visit Scheme, an integration plan with the Pearl River Delta, and the construction of high-speed rail.

Both the Hong Kong government and Chinese government pushed for continuing integration of the two territories, through principles such as one country, two systems. In contrast, local groups defined Hong Kong as an independent city-state. These points of discontent led to the economic and cultural protectionism movements in Hong Kong. Localism is the opposition to integrating Hong Kong with mainland China.

Before the handover of Hong Kong, the Hong Kong intellectuals suggested providing resources to mainland China for modernization and promotion of freedom and progressive values. However, due to the rise of Chinese economic and political power, Hong Kong transitioned its approach to providing education, culture, and civic resources to China.

Localism rejected these efforts, calling to reserving resources for Hong Kong's issues and interests. The democratic reform in the 2010s was also met with obstructions. Although the Hong Kong government attempted to move the electoral system towards universal suffrage, the pro-democracy camp of the Legislative Council rejected incremental progress. Localist Democracy advocates adopted an aggressive all-or-nothing strategy that directly confronted the central government and derailed any hope of moderate political reforms in Hong Kong.

=== Cultural and ethnic tensions ===
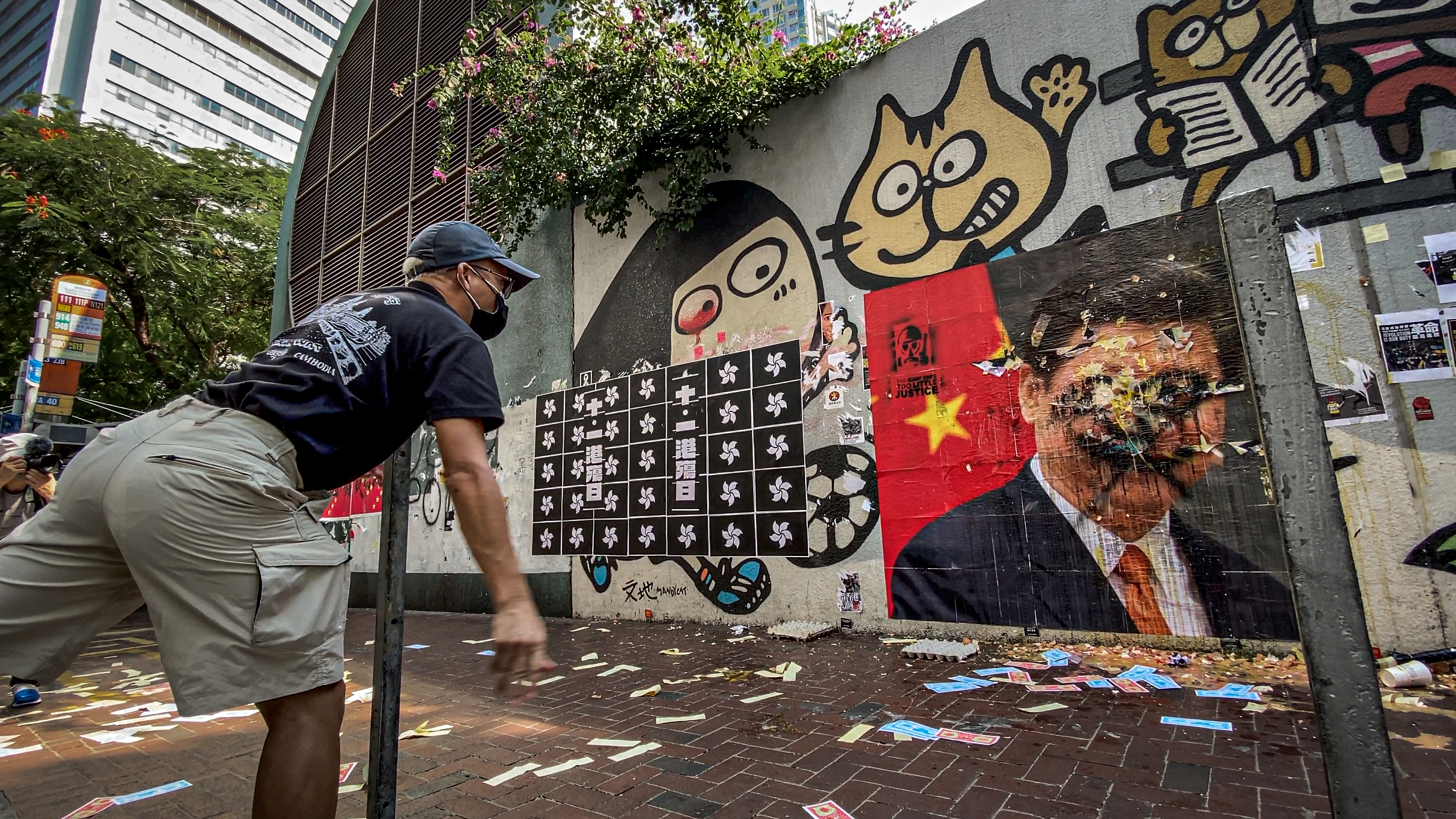
Hong Kong protesters threw eggs at Communist Party general secretary Xi Jinping's portrait on 2019 National Day.

Hong Kong is a society under British influence that has different values, languages, cultures, and economic circumstances than mainland China. These differences, as well as issues regarding the allocation of resources between Hong Kong and the mainland, were widely considered to be the primary cause of conflict.

According to the research conducted by Hong Kong Baptist University, a portion of the populace considered discrimination toward mainland Chinese morally justified due to localism sentiment, language differences, cultural differences, and nostalgia toward British rule.

Mainland Chinese people were called derogatory slurs, such as Cheena, the Cantonese pronunciation of Shina, and wong chung, meaning locust in Cantonese. The usage of the word began in Hong Kong local blogs and message boards such as HKGolden. Its usage became prominent in 2012, when local residents paid for full-page advertisements, depicting mainland Chinese as locusts, on the local tabloid-newspaper Apple Daily HK.

On Hong Kong university campuses, mainland Chinese students are often referred to as "Cheena dogs" and "yellow thugs" by local students.

In 2013, the death of a female mainlander led to celebration and anti-mainland comments from localist online trolls on platforms such as Facebook, HKGolden, and Apple Daily, causing severe damage to mainland China-Hong Kong civic relations. In a 2015 study, mainland Chinese students in Hong Kong who initially had a more positive view of the city than of their own mainland hometowns reported that their attempts at connecting with the locals were difficult due to experiences of hostility. Due to the rising tribalism and nationalism in Hong Kong and mainland China, the xenophobia between Hongkongers and mainlanders is reinforced and reciprocated.

Qing Dynasty
(China)
British Hong Kong
Japanese rule
(Japan)
British Hong Kong
HK SAR
(Hong Kong)
Qing Dynasty
(China)
Republic of China (1912–1949)
(Republic of China (1912–1949)) (Republic of China (1912–1949))
People's Republic of China
Qing rule
(China)
Japanese rule
(Japan)
ROC
(Taiwan)
│
1790
│
1815
│
1840
│
1865
│
1890
│
1915
│
1940
│
1965
│
1990
│
2015

== Incidents ==
=== Dolce & Gabbana controversy ===
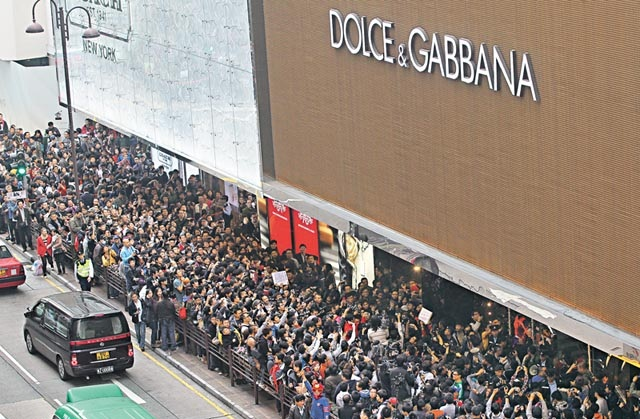
One of the four streets blocked during the D&G protest.

On 5 January 2012, Apple Daily reported that only Hong Kong citizens had been prevented from taking pictures of Dolce & Gabbana window displays at both of their Hong Kong fashion outlets, stirring anti-mainlander sentiment. Staff and security personnel at the flagship store on Canton Road said the pavement area outside the store was private property, and photography was forbidden.

This sparked protests spanning several days, and gained international news coverage on 8 January. Citing the case of Zhou Jiugeng (周久耕), a Nanjing official whose high-living lifestyle was identified by Chinese citizens using internet photographs, local news reports speculated that the Dolce & Gabbana photo ban may have been imposed at the request of some wealthy Chinese government officials. These officials may have feared photographs of them in the stores would circulate and fuel corruption allegations, as well as investigations into the source of their wealth.

=== Kong Qingdong calling Hong Kongers "old dogs" ===
In early 2012, Kong Qingdong, a Peking University professor, publicly called Hong Kongers "old dogs" in the aftermath of a controversy over a mainland Chinese child eating on the subway in Hong Kong. Kong's strong language prompted protests in Hong Kong.

=== Parallel business in Hong Kong ===
Since 2012, there has been an increase in mainland parallel traders. These traders come to the northern parts of Hong Kong to import goods, then export them back to mainland China. Popular products include infant formula and household products.

As a result of extended shortages of milk powder in Hong Kong, the government imposed restrictions on the amount of milk powder exports from Hong Kong. Beginning on 1 March 2013, each person is only allowed 2 cans, or 1.8 kg of milk powder, per trip in the MTR and cross-borders. Since northern places like Sheung Shui became the transaction centres of the traders, nearby residents were discontented.

=== Anchor babies in Hong Kong ===
Until 2012, the number of anchor babies in Hong Kong was increasing. Pregnant mainland women were seeking to give birth in Hong Kong. They aimed to benefit from the right of abode, and by extension social welfare in the city. Hong Kong citizens expressed concerns that the pregnant women and anchor babies put a heavier burden on Hong Kong's medical system. Some of them even called mainlanders "locusts" for taking away Hong Kong's resources from locals.

Over 170,000 new births where both parents were mainlanders occurred between 2001 and 2011, of which 32,653 births were in 2010. CY Leung's first public announcement on policy as Chief Executive-elect was to impose a 'zero' quota on mainland mothers giving birth in Hong Kong. Leung further underlined that those who did may not be able to secure the right of abode for their offspring in Hong Kong. Many of these anchor babies cross the border to attend school; there are approximately 28,000 daily cross-border pupils who attend school in Hong Kong but live in mainland China.

=== Racial abuse of Hong Kong football team ===
In 2015, the Chinese Football Association launched a series of posters relating to other Asian football teams. Among these, a poster appeared to mock the ethnic make-up of Hong Kong's football team with the words: “Do not underestimate the opponent. This is a team with black-, yellow- and white-skinned players, a diverse team that we must prepare for.” In response, in subsequent matches between Hong Kong, Bhutan, and the Maldives respectively, supporters of the Hong Kong team jeered when the Chinese national anthem was played for the Hong Kong team.

In April 2017, during a match in Hong Kong between Hong Kong club Eastern SC and Chinese club Guangzhou Evergrande, Evergrande fans displayed an "Annihilate British Dogs, Eradicate Hong Kong Independence Poison" banner during the game. This resulted in them being fined US$22,500.

=== Siu Yau-wai case ===
In July 2015, localists including Hong Kong Indigenous and Youngspiration marched to the Immigration Department to demand deportation of an undocumented 12-year-old mainland boy Siu Yau-wai, who lived in Hong Kong for nine years without identification. Siu, whose parents reside in mainland China, stayed with his grandparents after having overstayed his two-way permit nine years ago. Pro-Beijing Federation of Trade Unions lawmaker Chan Yuen-han advised and assisted the boy and his grandmother. He obtained them a temporary ID, and pleaded for compassion from the local community. Some called on the authorities to consider the case on a humanitarian basis and grant Siu permanent citizenship. Many others, afraid that the case would open the floodgates to appeals from other illegal immigrants, asked for the boy to be repatriated. The boy eventually gave up and returned to his parents in mainland China, after localist pressure.

=== Anti-mainlandisation motion ===
On 19 November 2015, an anti-mainlandisation motion was introduced in the Legislative Council by lawmaker Claudia Mo, but was voted down with 19 in favour and 34 opposing. The motion sought to defend local history and culture from the influence of mainland China. Supporters argued that mainlandisation would lead to more counterfeit and fake products, rampant corruption, and the abuse of power, and Hong Kong risked becoming another mainland city. Opponents of the motion argued that the motion was seeing different cultures with a narrow perspective, and intended to split the Chinese nation and create conflict.

=== CUHK democracy wall tensions ===
In September 2017, tensions arose at the Chinese University of Hong Kong. Mainland students, local students, university staff and student union staff disagreed over the content of posters and banners put up on the 'Democracy wall'.

Issues such as vandalism, disobeying rules, freedom of speech, displaying hateful messages, and respecting different opinions came into the spotlight. Similar incidents occurred at other Hong Kong universities; 'Democracy walls' appeared at Education University of Hong Kong, the University of Hong Kong, and Hong Kong Polytechnic University. This continued the Hong Kong Independence debate within Hong Kong society.

=== 2019–2020 Hong Kong protests ===
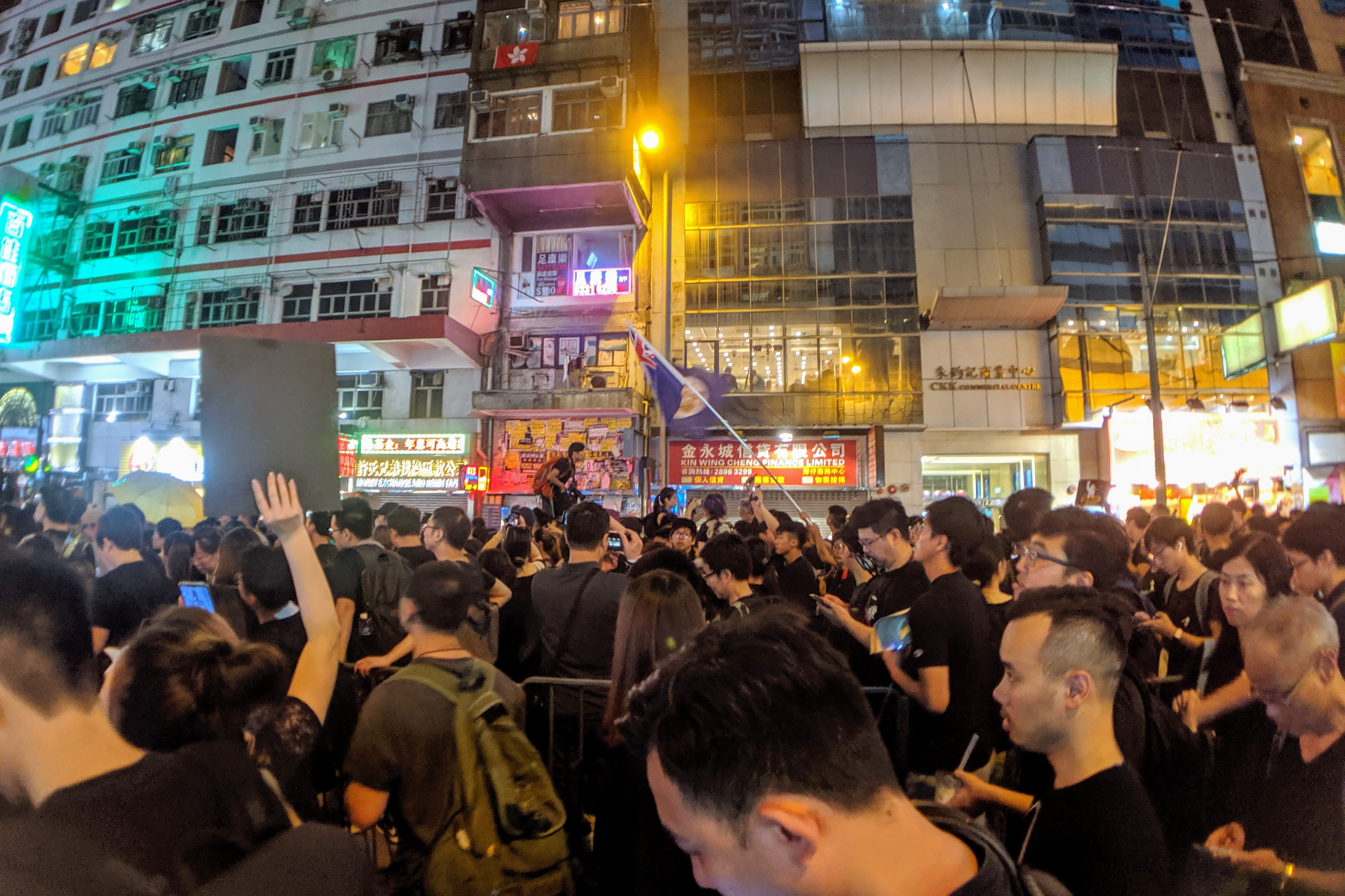
Hong Kong protests on 16 June 2019

In mid-2019, several mass protests took place. A proposed extradition bill would allow dissidents to be arbitrarily transferred to mainland China. The organisers of a march on 16 June claimed to have included two million people, a quarter of Hong Kong's population.

Throughout the summer and autumn, clashes between police and protesters occurred. Tolerance for differing opinions on the protests reportedly decreased in Hong Kong. Due to the outbreak of the COVID-19 pandemic, mass protests were suspended beginning in early February 2020. After the pandemic, resurgence in protests was minimal, due to the 2020 national security law, but some sporadic protests still occurred.

=== Property acquisition by the Chinese government ===
The Central People's Government (State Council of China) has acquired property in Hong Kong, albeit controversially.

The PLA Hong Kong Garrison's plans for the Central Military Dock have been contested by lawmakers. The radar station at Tai Mo Shan was secretly opened, against the Garrison Law, which states that "the locations and boundaries of the military restricted zones shall be declared by the government." In addition, Reuters reported that many military sites are underused and could be returned to public use.

The Liaison Office has also purchased significant residential housing through its private subsidiary, Newman Investment. They have escaped paying stamp duties, even though Newman Investment is not registered as an organisation that serves the public. Public taxpayer money has essentially subsidised purchases of housing by the Liaison Office. This means less housing is available for citizens.

=== Abductions of people in Hong Kong by Chinese authorities ===
Beginning in 2015, mainland authorities have made multiple attempts to abduct people in Hong Kong and take them to the mainland.

On 26 May 2015, Gu Zhuoheng, owner of Sing Pao Daily News, was almost abducted by mainland authorities after landing at Hong Kong International Airport. While at the Regal Hotel, Gu said that more than 20 mainland authorities with firearms attempted to extradite him to the mainland; Gu resisted until hotel security guards called airport police to assist him. Hong Kong police confirmed the incident but then released the suspects due to "insufficient evidence."

Lee Bo, a staff member of Causeway Bay Books, was abducted several months later, in December 2015, and taken to Shenzhen. The Hong Kong Immigration Department has no record of Lee leaving Hong Kong, meaning he was brought across the border without going through normal border control.

In another incident in January 2017, Xiao Jianhua, a businessman, was abducted from the Four Seasons Hotel in Hong Kong and taken to the mainland.

=== Porous borders and smuggling ===
Hong Kong is a free port and has no customs tariff on imported goods, while mainland China does. This offers smugglers an opportunity to take advantage of price differences. Smugglers use speedboats to illegally bring goods from Hong Kong to mainland China without paying tariffs, including meat and ginseng. Those arrested have included both Hong Kong and mainland Chinese citizens.

In 2019, a total of 1,050 tonnes of contraband was seized by customs officers. For the first six months of 2020, 2,500 tonnes of frozen meat were seized. In January 2020, three Hong Kong customs officers were killed when their boat capsized during an anti-smuggling operation. A cargo vessel, believed to have collided with the officers' boat, was found later with 1000 boxes of frozen meat, destined for mainland China.

Smugglers have also used land-based vehicles to smuggle goods in Sha Tau Kok, a village in northeastern Hong Kong. Additionally, Sha Tau Kok has a porous and blurry border through Chung Ying Street, where residents with a Frontier Closed Area permit can cross between Hong Kong and mainland China without going through normal border control. In March 2020, it was discovered that even though the Hong Kong government implemented a rule that those entering Hong Kong from mainland China must quarantine for 14 days to prevent the spread of COVID-19, those entering Hong Kong from mainland China through Sha Tau Kok were exempted from quarantine measures.

=== HKU Student Union video ===
On 1 September 2020, HKU Student Union's CampusTV released a "parody video" welcoming the new mainland Chinese students to HKU, which contained certain negative references to recent events. On 2 September, the university management of HKU condemned the video as bullying and hate speech towards mainland Chinese. On 3 September, CampusTV removed the video and apologised for "the inaccurate use of words and the misunderstanding caused", stating it did not mean to target anyone, but merely to point out the failings of the university management to the HKU students (through a parody video).

=== Catholicism ===
In October 2021, the Liaison Office met senior Hong Kong Catholic clergymen and briefed them on CCP General Secretary Xi Jinping's views on the "Sinicization" of religion, or the adoption of "Chinese characteristics" within established religions.

In May 2022, retired Cardinal Joseph Zen was arrested by the national security police. German Cardinal Gerhard Mueller said that Zen was being sacrificed to please Beijing, stating "This cardinal will be sacrificed on the altar of reason, to defend and implement the diplomatic agreement with Beijing. I foresee this risk and I feel pain."

In July 2022, the Vatican's unofficial representative in Hong Kong, monsignor Javier Herrera-Corona, warned that religious freedoms were over in Hong Kong due to pressure from mainland Chinese authorities, with one person summarizing the monsignor's message as "Hong Kong is not the great Catholic beachhead it was."

== Impact ==
=== Emergence of Hong Kong national identity ===
Since the early 2010s there has been a major rise of awareness in Hong Konger self-identity, which was largely seen as a reaction to the gradual encroachment of the One country, two systems status-quo by the PRC government especially after Xi Jinping's rise to power in 2012.

In February 2014, the Undergrad, the official publication of the Hong Kong University Students' Union (HKUSU) published a few articles on the subject of a Hong Kong nation including "The Hong Kong nation deciding its own fate" and "Democracy and Independence for Hong Kong". Chief Executive Leung Chun-ying used his 2015 New Year's policy address to direct harsh criticism at the magazine for promoting Hong Kong independence, which in fact had little traction up to that point, fanning both the debate and sales of the book Hong Kong Nationalism which featured the articles

With reference to the survey conducted by a public opinion programme of the University of Hong Kong, the identity index of interviewees who regarded themselves as "Chinese" plummeted between the years of 2008–2014, from approximately 7.5 in 2008 to a continuous fluctuation within the range between 6–7.

=== Exacerbation of conflicts between local and mainlanders ===
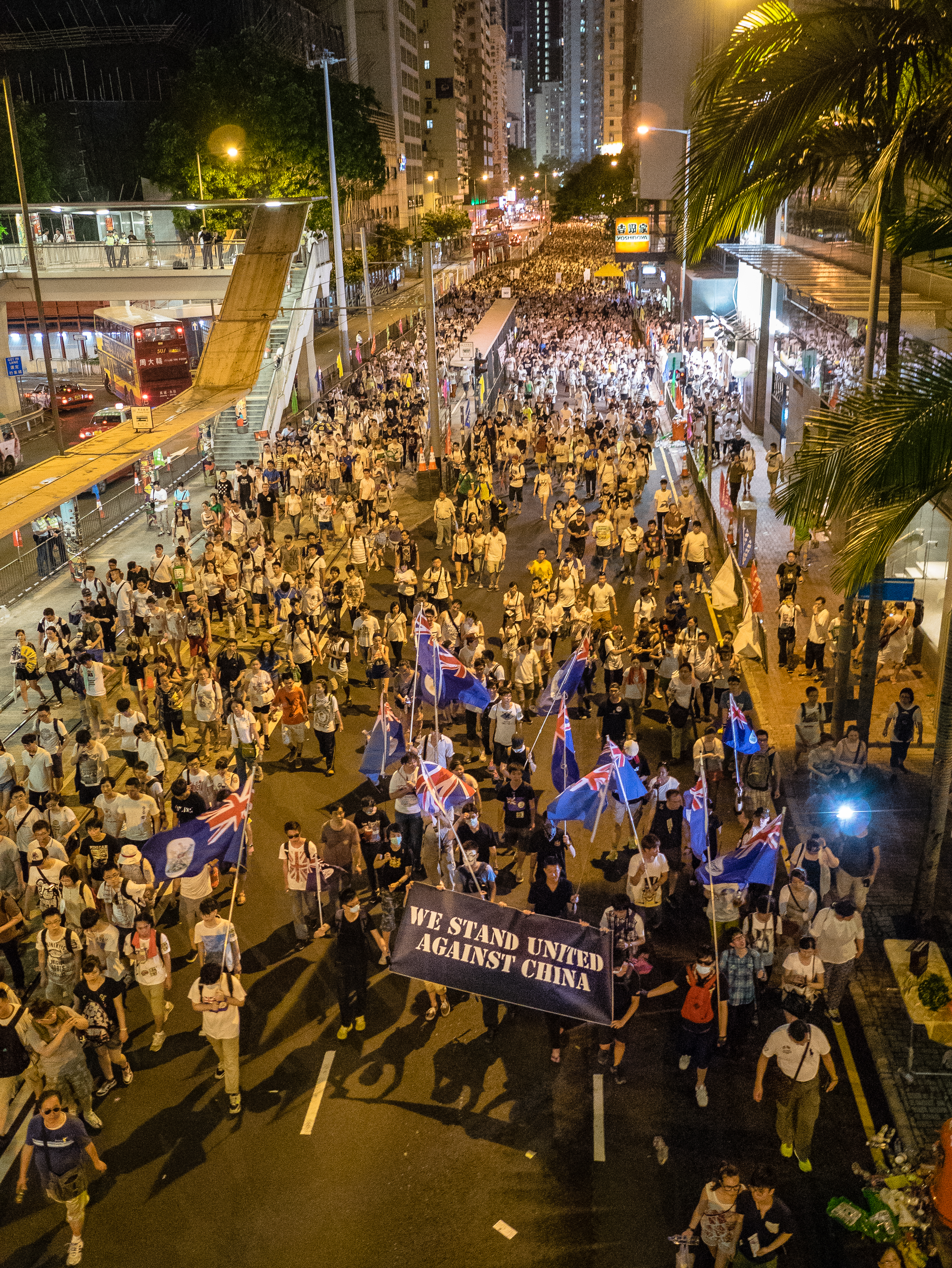
Hong Kong 1 July march in 2014

There are differences in culture and political backgrounds between those from Hong Kong and mainland China. Hong Kong was ruled by the British based on the system of letters patent from the 1850s to 1997, whereas China has been under the control of the Chinese Communist Party from 1949 onwards.

Some Hong Kong people see mainlanders as rude, impolite, and poorly educated. This further leads to locals' nonacceptance of mainlanders, especially when they travel in Hong Kong. Travelers from the mainland are coming in such tremendous numbers that their existence can influence the direction of government's policies. The premise of various protests within the 2010s were related to the issue of the individual visit scheme adversely affecting the daily lives of Hongkongers. On the other hand, some Mainlanders view Hong Kong with suspicion, mistrust and increasing enmity.

Some mainland Chinese students in Hong Kong who initially had a more positive view of the city than of their own mainland hometowns have reported that their attempts at connecting with the locals were difficult due to experiences of hostility and a sense of inferiority.

=== Emergence of new 'localist' parties ===
The 2014 Hong Kong protests led to the birth of new political parties. The pan-democrats encourage young people who participated in the Occupy movement to register and vote in the district council poll. The first wave of dilettantes, about 50 in number, many of whom were millennials having political aspirations and disillusioned with the political establishment, and who were influenced by the Umbrella Revolution, contested the 2015 district council elections. Pitted against seasoned politicians, and with support only from friends and family, they became popularly known as "Umbrella Soldiers".

During the 2016 Hong Kong legislative election, six localist groups which emerged after the 2014 Umbrella Revolution, Youngspiration, Kowloon East Community, Tin Shui Wai New Force, Cheung Sha Wan Community Establishment Power, Tsz Wan Shan Constructive Power and Tuen Mun Community, formed an electoral alliance under the name "ALLinHK" to field candidates in four of the five geographical constituencies with the agenda to put forward a referendum on Hong Kong's self-determination, while Hong Kong Indigenous and another new pro-independence Hong Kong National Party attempted to run in the upcoming election. The student leaders in the Umbrella Revolution, Joshua Wong, Oscar Lai and Agnes Chow of Scholarism and Nathan Law of the Hong Kong Federation of Students (HKFS) formed a new party called Demosistō. The new party calls for referendum on Hong Kong's future after 2047 when the one country, two systems principle is supposed to expire and fielded candidates in Hong Kong Island and Kowloon East.

=== Changing view of Hong Kong's development of democracy ===
Due to recent tensions between Mainland and Hong Kong people, along with impact of the Umbrella Movement, different sectors of Hong Kong have shifted their view of Hong Kong's development of democracy.

Traditionally, the pan-democratic camp campaigned for democracy in China and Hong Kong, however after the Umbrella Movement, with the rise of localism, there were calls to make Hong Kong democratic first, then China or only focus on making Hong Kong democratic. In recent years, localism within Hong Kong, has been gaining popularity of Hong Kong youth, this has led to new political parties and organisations being formed. Some Localist parties have taken the latter view of democracy, while others promote the notion of Hong Kong Independence, believing that only when Hong Kong is independent from mainland China can real democracy be established.

Likewise, since the end of Umbrella Movement, the pro-Beijing camp as well as Mainland officials, along with CY Leung and Carrie Lam, have said that the development of democracy in Hong Kong is not a top priority and that the Hong Kong government should focus on livelihood issues first.

== Signs of mainlandisation in Hong Kong ==
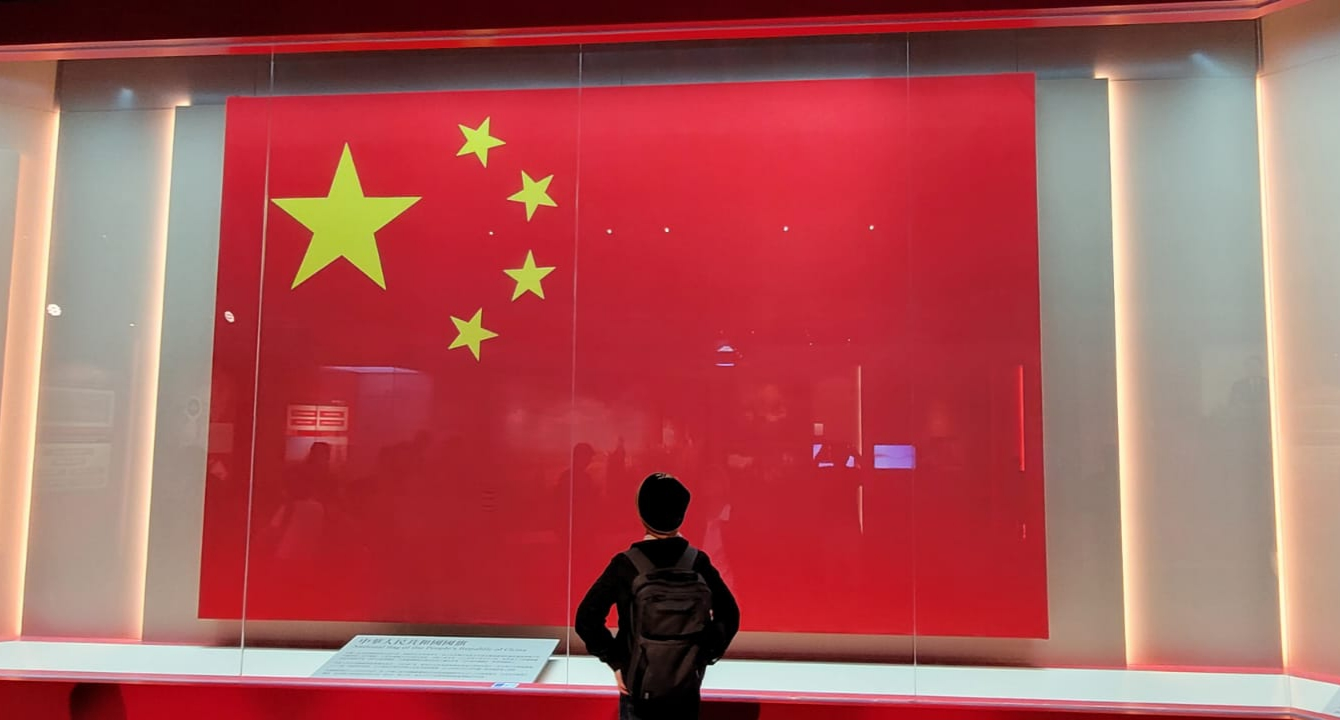
A large Chinese national flag at the Hong Kong Museum of History's National Security Exhibition Gallery

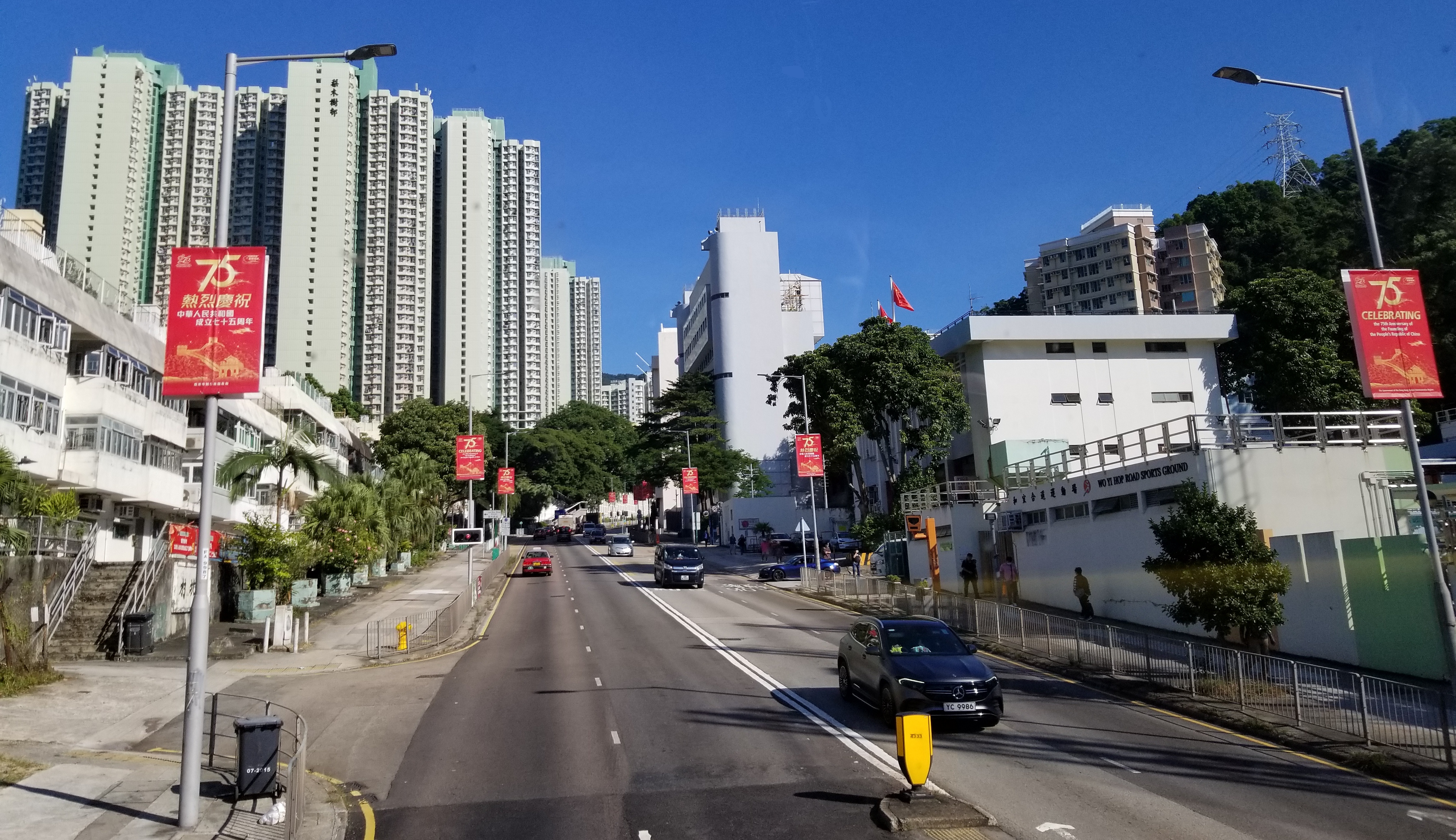
Street banners on Wo Yi Hop Road in Kwai Chung, Tsuen Wan, celebrating the 75th anniversary of the founding of the People's Republic of China in 2024

Since 1997, Hong Kong has been a part of China under the "one country, two systems" approach. Within Hong Kong society, there are different views of this arrangement. Within the political spectrum, the Pro-Beijing camp tends to focus on "one country" aspect, where Hong Kong will gradually integrate into China, while following and supporting the Central government policies as being a guarantee for stability and prosperity in Hong Kong. However, in the Pro-democracy camp, the focus is on the "two systems" approach, where Hong Kong, while acknowledging that it is a part of China and thus has an obligation to cooperate with it, should strive to develop more democratic institutions and preserve freedoms and human rights to achieve prosperity.

Over the years, there have been incidents of mainlandisation within some sectors of society are worried about the changing environment of Hong Kong. Mainlandisation or Integration of Hong Kong is the official policy Beijing government and its Beijing supporters in Hong Kong are actively helping to promote its agenda, using their power to influence certain key decision-making choices within Hong Kong society.

=== Language policies: promotion of Mandarin ===
Under the Basic Law of Hong Kong, Chinese and English are the official languages. In reality Mandarin is increasingly given more importance. In recent years, Mandarin has been increasingly used in Hong Kong, which has led to fears of Cantonese being replaced. In May 2018, The Education Bureau of Hong Kong stated that Cantonese is a dialect, so it cannot be considered a mother tongue language. This caused an uproar in Hong Kong, as it was seen as downgrading Cantonese in favour of Mandarin, and as the majority of Hong Kong people speak Cantonese as their first language.

The use of English and its proficiency in Hong Kong has also suffered a decline in standards. The promotion and growth of Mandarin over Cantonese and English in Hong Kong has led to questions being raised by mainlanders about Hong Kong's competitiveness in the global economy, its dependency on the Mainland's economy and its loss of a distinct cultural identity.

=== Moral and national education controversy ===
Moral and national education (abbr. MNE, 德育及國民教育; 德育及国民教育) is a school curriculum proposed by the Education Bureau of Hong Kong, transformed from the current moral and civic education (MCE, 德育及公民教育). The Hong Kong government attempted to pass the curriculum in 2012, which led to protests. The subject was particularly controversial for praising the communist and nationalist ideology of China's government on the one hand, and condemning democracy and republicanism on the other.

=== Increasing self-censorship in the media industry ===
Since 2002, Hong Kong's press freedom has significantly declined. In 2017, Reporters Without Borders, which examines freedom of press in 180 countries and regions, ranked Hong Kong at 73rd in the world, a drop from 18th place in 2002, 34th in 2011, 54th in 2012, 58th in 2013, 61st in 2014, and 70th in 2015. The organisation has China ranked at 176 and Taiwan at 45 – the highest ranking among all Asian countries in 2017.

Hong Kong Journalists Association attributes this to increasing self-censorship within the industry, due to staff members not wanting to upset people in Beijing in fear of retaliation or loss of future opportunities. Jason Y. Ng, writing for the Hong Kong Free Press remarks that, "The post-handover era has witnessed a series of ownership changes in the media industry. Self-censorship can also take the form of personnel changes, including management reshuffling in the newsroom and discontinuation of influential columns."

=== Integration infrastructure projects ===
In recent years, there have been many infrastructure projects and policies connecting Hong Kong to mainland China. The pro-democracy camp is suspicious of such projects, arguing that the mainland government is slowly gaining control and influence over Hong Kong, as this integration will eventually turn Hong Kong into another mainland city and make it lose its uniqueness. A focus of criticism is the minimum or lack of consultation from the Hong Kong people regarding these projects or policies, with many regarding them as 'white elephants' of questionable benefit. Another concern is the environmental impact of such projects as well as the high costs, with some projects going far over budget, with the costs being ultimately shouldered by the local taxpayer. However the pro-Beijing camp argues that these projects are to help redevelop Hong Kong, help it maintain its competitiveness and provide new economic opportunities.

List of Integration infrastructure projects:

- North East New Territories New Development Areas Planning
- Greater Bay Area & Belt and Road Initiative
- Hong Kong–Zhuhai–Macau Bridge
- Guangzhou–Shenzhen–Hong Kong Express Rail Link Hong Kong section
- Lok Ma Chau Loop
- Shanghai-Hong Kong Stock Connect & Shenzhen-Hong Kong Stock Connect
- Lok Ma Chau Station & Hong Kong–Shenzhen Western Corridor
- Hong Kong Palace Museum

=== One-way permits ===
Since the handover, the one-way permit scheme, which allows 150 mainlanders a day to come to Hong Kong and Macau to reunite with their families, is administered by Chinese authorities, with Hong Kong and Macau authorities having no say on who can come in. Most of people on this quota end up going to Hong Kong. In recent years this quota has sparked intense debate on the positives, negatives and impacts it has on Hong Kong society. The Beijing government argues that the scheme is to prevent illegal immigration into Hong Kong and Macau.

The Pro-Beijing camp argue that these new immigrants are to help combat an ageing population as well as bringing new talent into the city. The pro-democracy camp, however, sees the one-way permit scheme as a tool for Beijing to gradually change the population mix in Hong Kong and integrate the city with China. A majority of immigrants from the mainland tend to cast their votes in favour of pro-Beijing politicians during elections for district councils and the legislature. Others point out, that too many immigrants are taking away resources from local graduates as there is more competition for jobs and housing. This has led to calls from the pro-democracy camp to change or modify the scheme to allow the Hong Kong government to have a say in choosing which immigrants to come or final approval, while the localist camp advocate cancelling the scheme, saying this preferential treatment has put a strain on resources in Hong Kong and argues that immigrants from the mainland can come and settle in Hong Kong like any other immigrants from around the world.

In at least one year, more than the so-called "maximum" of 150 daily mainlanders were allowed in; 57,387 mainlanders entered Hong Kong in 2017, averaging approximately 157 people per day.

=== Curtailing academic freedoms ===
In 2015, The University of Hong Kong governing council rejected the appointment of the recommended candidate Johannes Chan (Dean of the Faculty of Law 2004–2014) to the post of pro-vice-chancellor in charge of staffing and resources. The governing council's decision, the first time that a candidate selected by the committee has been rejected, is widely viewed as political retaliation for Chan's involvement with pro-democratic figures. A majority of HKU Council members are not students or staff of the university, and many were directly appointed by then HKSAR Chief Executive Leung Chun-ying, the majority with Pro-Beijing views. The decision has received international condemnation, and is widely being viewed as part of a Beijing-backed curtailing of academic freedoms that will damage Hong Kong's academic reputation.

Since the end of 2014 Hong Kong protests, professors and lecturers with pro-democracy views or sympathies have experienced media smear campaigns from pro-communist newspapers, harassment from paid Pro-Beijing mobs, cyber-attacks, unrenewed contracts, rejection of jobs or promotions, suffered demotions or blocked from taking senior management positions by university councils, where most members are appointed by the Chief Executive, who are loyal to Beijing.

=== Undermining judicial independence ===
The Hong Kong Bar Association has claimed that Beijing has undermined Hong Kong's judicial independence and rule of law through the Standing Committee of the National People's Congress (NPCSC) interpretation of the Hong Kong Basic Law. These controversial interpretations have led to the legal sector of Hong Kong to stage rare silent protests over these interpretations and since 1997 four have been held. It is feared that China wants the Hong Kong's judiciary to become the same format and have the same characteristics as in the mainland.

The first march took place in 1999, when the NPCSC issued the first interpretation of the Basic Law relating to the issue of the right of abode of Chinese citizens with Hong Kong parents. The second was held in 2005 after the NPCSC interpreted a provision in the Hong Kong Basic Law regarding the chief executive's term of office. The third was held in June 2014 over Beijing's issuance of a white paper on the one country, two systems policy, which stated that judges in Hong Kong should be "patriotic" and are "administrators" that are supposed to co-operate with the Executive Branch of Hong Kong, whereas many in Hong Kong believe the Judiciary, Executive and Legislature are independent from each other, as is standard in Western democracies. The fourth march occurred in November 2016, over Hong Kong Legislative Council oath-taking controversy, with over 3000 lawyers and activists parading through Hong Kong in silence and dressed in black.

In late December 2017, in response to the co-location agreement in West Kowloon, the Hong Kong Bar Association issued the following statement: "The current co-location arrangement is in direct contravention of the Basic Law and if implemented would substantially damage the rule of law in Hong Kong. The rule of law will be threatened and undermined if the clear meaning of the Basic Law can be twisted and the provisions of the Basic Law can be interpreted according to expediency and convenience."

=== Political screening of election candidates ===
During the 2014–2015 political reform period, after months of public consultations, the NPCSC issued its decision to allow Hong Kong to have universal suffrage in 2017, with the caveat that candidates would have to be approved by a nominating committee. This triggered the 2014 Hong Kong protests, with many protestors calling it "fake democracy" and political screening that is not genuine universal suffrage. The protests failed to deliver any concessions, but in June 2015 the reform package was voted down by a majority of the legislators, thus showing a lack of popular support for the political reform package.

The 2016 Legco elections, 2017 NPC elections and 2018 Hong Kong by-elections saw potential candidates being disqualified by Returning Officers of the Electoral Affairs Commission who had been given the power to conduct unaccountable political screening. This resulted in the disqualification of six candidates in 2016, 10 in 2017 and a further three in 2018, who were claimed by the Returning Officers to have held "incorrect political views". These elections included a confirmation form where candidates have to accept Article 1 of the Basic Law and swear to uphold the Basic Law. The returning officers believed the candidates were not sincere about complying with Article 1 of the Basic Law (that Hong Kong was an inalienable part of China), thus they were disqualified. This was interpreted by Hong Kong Watch as indicating that there was no fair, open, certain and clear procedure to regulate the process, as the final decision rests on a civil servant's opinion, resulting in arbitrary decisions. In the 2018 Hong Kong by-elections, Agnes Chow was disqualified on the basis that Demosisto's advocacy of "self-determination" after 2047 "could not possibly comply" with Basic Law, despite her fellow party member Nathan Law being allowed to participate and winning a seat in the 2016 Legco elections on exactly the same election platform.

In May 2018, the government announced that support for the Basic Law (particularly Article 1) would be required for all candidates for the upcoming District Council elections in 2019.

=== National security law ===
On 28 May 2020, China's National People's Congress approved the controversial national security laws for Hong Kong, which aim at cracking down protests and ban "any acts or activities" that the communist government considers to endanger China's national security. The critics have called this new legislation a "killer blow" to Hong Kong's autonomy and freedoms. The legislation allows the government's national security agencies to operate in Hong Kong.

=== National Anthem Ordinance ===
In June 2020, a law was passed, making it an offence for those who insult the National Anthem of the People's Republic of China. In addition, the bill goes beyond insulting the anthem, as part 4 of it dictates that primary and secondary education in Hong Kong must incorporate the national anthem in their curriculum, including its singing, history and etiquette regarding it.

=== Electoral reform ===
On 11 March 2021, China's National People's Congress approved the controversial electoral laws for Hong Kong, which aims to ensure a system of "patriots governing Hong Kong". The reforms expanded the number of seats in the Legco and Chief Executive Election Committee, but reduces the number of directly democratically elected seats. Hong Kong Government officials and pro-establishment figures have hailed the reforms as a way to shut out "anti-China" forces from the political structure whereas the pro-democracy camp in Hong Kong criticised the reforms as a "major regression" in democracy.

== See also ==
- Anti-People's Republic of China
- Chinese nationalism
- Human rights in Hong Kong
- Hong Kong nationalism, Hong Kong independence
- Jimmy Lai
