= Chan Chak-to =

Hong Kong politician and activist

- 陳澤滔
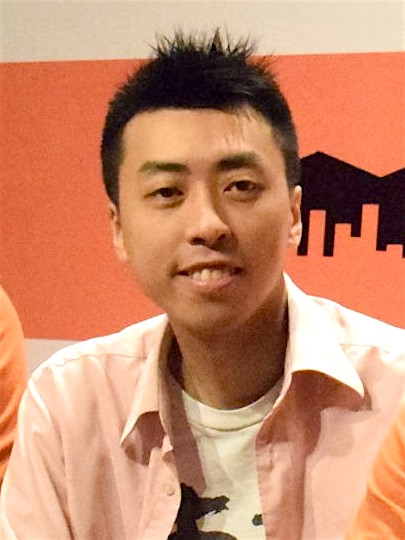

Spokesman of the Kowloon East Community
- Incumbent
- Assumed office December 2014

Personal details
- Born: 1984 (age 41–42) Hong Kong
- Party: Kowloon East Community
- Occupation: Computer engineer

Chan Chak-to (Chinese: 陳澤滔; born 1984) is a Hong Kong politician and activist. He is known for his outright pro-Hong Kong independence stance and his active involvement in the electoral politics as a localist. He is currently the convenor of the district-based Kowloon East Community, which commands one seat in the District Councils.

== Early life and activism ==
Chan was born in Hong Kong in 1984 to a single parent. His mother single-handedly raised him and his two sisters as his father died before he was born. He was educated at the Sing Yin Secondary School and studied Computer Engineering at the Chinese University of Hong Kong. He went to Australia through a working holiday scheme for a year before he worked as an engineer at the Hong Kong Disneyland.

He was first arrested for rehearing the Occupy Central plan in the 2014 July 1 protest among the total number of 511 protesters. In the massive 2014 Hong Kong protests, he and other netizens from the Hong Kong Golden Forum formed the district-based Kowloon East Community and planned to run in the 2015 District Council elections, the first election after the historic protest.

== Electoral politics ==
The Community filled in three candidates in the Kwun Tong District Council, in which Chan ran in the Hong Lok against the pro-Beijing incumbent Ma Yat-chiu. He received 1,525 votes, narrowly defeated by 99 votes, while another member Wong Chin-ken ousted the incumbent Fung Kam-yuen in Lok Wah North.

In the 2016 Legislative Council election, Kowloon East Community formed the localist electoral alliance "ALLinHK" with Youngspiration, Tin Shui Wai New Force, Cheung Sha Wan Community Establishment Power, Tsz Wan Shan Constructive Power and Tuen Mun Community with the slogan "Hong Kong nation's self-determination" where Chan led a one-man ticket in Kowloon East constituency. Despite he and other candidates were required to sign the extra confirmation form to declare their understanding of Hong Kong being an inalienable part of China as stipulated in the Basic Law of Hong Kong. Although refusing to sign the form, Chan's candidacy was confirmed by the Electoral Affairs Commission while some others were disqualified from running.

After several warnings against the pro-independence candidates that they might still be disqualified, Chan spoke for the Hong Kong independence in several electoral forums: "I support Hong Kong independence ... it’s the only way out." He also demanded the Basic Law to be scrapped. He eventually received 12,854 votes and was not elected.

In the 2016 Election Committee Subsector elections, Chan joined the pro-democracy IT Vision to run in the Information Technology subsector against incumbent Chief Executive Leung Chun-ying from running for second term. He was elected with 4,238 votes. In the 2017 Chief Executive election, Chan nominated retired judge Woo Kwok-hing.

Party political offices
New title	Spokesman of Kowloon East Community; 2014–present	Incumbent
