= Hong Kong National Front =

Pro–Hong Kong independence organisation

Hong Kong National Front 香港民族陣綫
- Convenor: Louis Lo (Note: Chinese: 盧溢燊; Jyutping: Lou^{4} Jat^{6}-san^{1}) (until 2019)
- Spokesperson: Baggio Leung (2018–2020)
- Founded: 2015
- Banned: 30 June 2020
- Headquarters: Central, Hong Kong (until 30 June 2020)
- Membership (2018): 30
- Ideology: Hong Kong independence; Hong Kong localism; Anti-communism
- Slogan: "Liberate Hong Kong, the revolution of our time!" (Note: Adopted on 26 August 2019.)

Party flag

Hong Kong National Front
- Traditional Chinese: 香港民族陣綫
- Simplified Chinese: 香港民族阵线
Transcriptions
Standard Mandarin
- Hanyu Pinyin: Xiānggǎng Mínzú Zhènxiàn
Yue: Cantonese
- Jyutping: Hoeng^{1}gong^{2} Man^{4}zuk^{6} Zan^{6}sin^{3}

The Hong Kong National Front (HKNF) (Note: Chinese: 香港民族陣綫; Jyutping: Hoeng^{1}gong^{2} Man^{4}zuk^{6} Zan^{6}sin^{3}) is a political organisation that advocates the independence of Hong Kong from China. Originally based in Central, Hong Kong, it was forced to cease its activities in the city following the imposition of the Hong Kong national security law on 30 June 2020. The group currently operates in exile in Taiwan and the United Kingdom.

Baggio Leung, a pro-independence politician who briefly served as a member of the Legislative Council in late 2016, joined the HKNF as its new spokesperson on 24 September 2018. He was the most high-profile politician to join the HKNF; he resigned from his position following the dissolution of the HKNF's Hong Kong branch.

On 20 July 2019, the Hong Kong Police Force raided a factory unit belonging to the HKNF's then convenor Louis Lo and found a cache of high explosives. Lo was arrested along with two others and charged with possessing unlicensed explosives. He was sentenced to 12 years in prison by the High Court.

== History ==
=== Before the 2019 protests ===
The Hong Kong National Front (HKNF) was founded by a small group of young activists in 2015. It reportedly had a membership of 30 people in May 2018, but by the end of the year the number of participants in its rallies had dropped to around 20.

Baggio Leung, the convenor of the localist political party Youngspiration, announced on 24 September 2018 that he had joined the HKNF as its new spokesperson. The announcement came an hour before the similarly-named Hong Kong National Party was banned by the Hong Kong government over "national security concerns", a decision which Leung expected. Leung had briefly served as a member of the Legislative Council of Hong Kong in late 2016; he was unseated for making inappropriate remarks against China during his oath of office. The HKNF expressed its hope that Leung's membership would allow the HKNF and Youngspiration to better coordinate with each other and share resources. It also described Leung's decision to join as an "important step toward moving the gears of [Hong Kong] history forward". Leung reciprocated these sentiments in his own statement, saying: "[The Hong Kong independence camp] must show unity when it is being suppressed. I hope that by joining the HKNF I will allow [the HKNF] to continue its work."

The HKNF supported a February 2019 petition which demanded a public apology from the school administration of Xianggang Putonghua Yanxishe Primary School of Science and Creativity in Tin Shui Wai. During a news report by i-Cable, multiple students from the school told interviewers that they faced reprimand and punishment if they spoke Cantonese in class. The HKNF released a joint statement on the matter alongside Tin Shui Wai New Force, Studentlocalism, Students Independence Union, and Societas Linguistica Hongkongensis.

The HKNF's Facebook page was the target of a disinformation and harassment campaign in 2019. Facebook posts made by the HKNF received thousands of comments falsely accusing HKNF members of extreme violence and links to the United States' Central Intelligence Agency. Steven Feldstein, an American researcher who previously worked for the U.S. State Department, attributed the campaign to the Chinese government.

=== Explosives case ===
In the early morning hours of 20 July 2019, officers from the Organised Crime and Triad Bureau of the Hong Kong Police Force raided a unit on the 20th floor of Lung Shing Factory Building in Tsuen Wan and found a cache of high explosives. An Explosive Ordnance Disposal team was subsequently dispatched and 1.5 kilograms (3.3 lb) of TATP, (Note: Originally reported to be 2 kilograms (4.4 lb).) 10 incendiary devices, and several jugs of acid were seized. According to police, bomb disposal experts then safely destroyed the TATP in a controlled explosion on the factory's rooftop. The owner of the unit was Louis Lo, the convenor of the HKNF at the time. He was arrested and charged with "possessing explosives without a license". Two other men surnamed Hau and Tang were also arrested and received the same charge. Commenting on the raid, Leung told Hong Kong Free Press that he could not yet confirm why explosives were found in Lo's unit, but more information would become available to the public once Lo was released on bail. However, Lo was denied bail due to the seriousness of his alleged crime, which occurred amidst anti-government protests.

The prosecution focused on the amount of TATP discovered inside Lo's unit while building their case against him. Prosecutors noted that the amount of TATP found by police was the largest such discovery since the 1997 handover of Hong Kong. The defence, however, countered by questioning whether police really did find that much TATP, as bomb disposal experts supposedly detonated the explosives safely on the factory's rooftop, even though a mere 280 grams (9.9 oz) of TATP would be enough to blow up an airplane. On 25 November 2019, the prosecution amended Lo's charge to "manufacturing explosives with the intent to endanger life or property" and requested that the case be referred to the High Court. The prosecution's request was approved by magistrate Colin Wong on 2 March 2020.

After several delays due to the COVID-19 pandemic in Hong Kong, Lo's sentencing was held on 23 April 2021. He pleaded guilty to one count of "possessing explosives with the intent to endanger life or property" and was sentenced to 12 years in prison by High Court Justice Andrew Chan. During the sentencing, Chan compared Lo's case with that of Yip Kai-foon, an infamous Chinese gangster of the 1980s and 1990s who was found with 1.8 kilograms (4.0 lb) of explosives when he was arrested. Lo appealed his sentence, but the Court of Appeal refused his request on 25 April 2022.

=== Dissolution of Hong Kong branch ===
On 30 June 2020, the day the Hong Kong national security law was passed and came into force, the HKNF announced that it was dissolving its branch in Hong Kong and indefinitely moving its operations abroad to Taiwan and the United Kingdom. Although the law did not ban the HKNF specifically, it did outlaw "acts of secession".

== Ideology ==
The Hong Kong National Front advocates Hong Kong independence and localism. Citing the International Covenant on Civil and Political Rights, the group argues that Hong Kong lost its right to self-determination when the Sino-British Joint Declaration was "negotiated without representatives of the Hong Kong people". It views the Chinese Communist Party as an existential threat to the way of life in Hong Kong and vehemently opposes the Chinese government's activities in the city.

== See also ==
- Taiwanese Localism Front
