= ALLinHK =

- Founded: 10 April 2016
- Membership: Youngspiration; Kowloon East Community; Tin Shui Wai New Force; Cheung Sha Wan Community Establishment Power; Tsz Wan Shan Constructive Power; Tuen Mun Community
- Ideology: Hong Kong nationalism

ALLinHK was an electoral alliance formed by six groups which emerged from the 2014 Hong Kong protests and consists of Youngspiration, Kowloon East Community, Tin Shui Wai New Force, Cheung Sha Wan Community Establishment Power, Tsz Wan Shan Constructive Power and Tuen Mun Community. It was formed to improve prospects in the 2016 Hong Kong Legislative Council election with the slogan of "Hong Kong nation's self-determination".

== Alliance ==
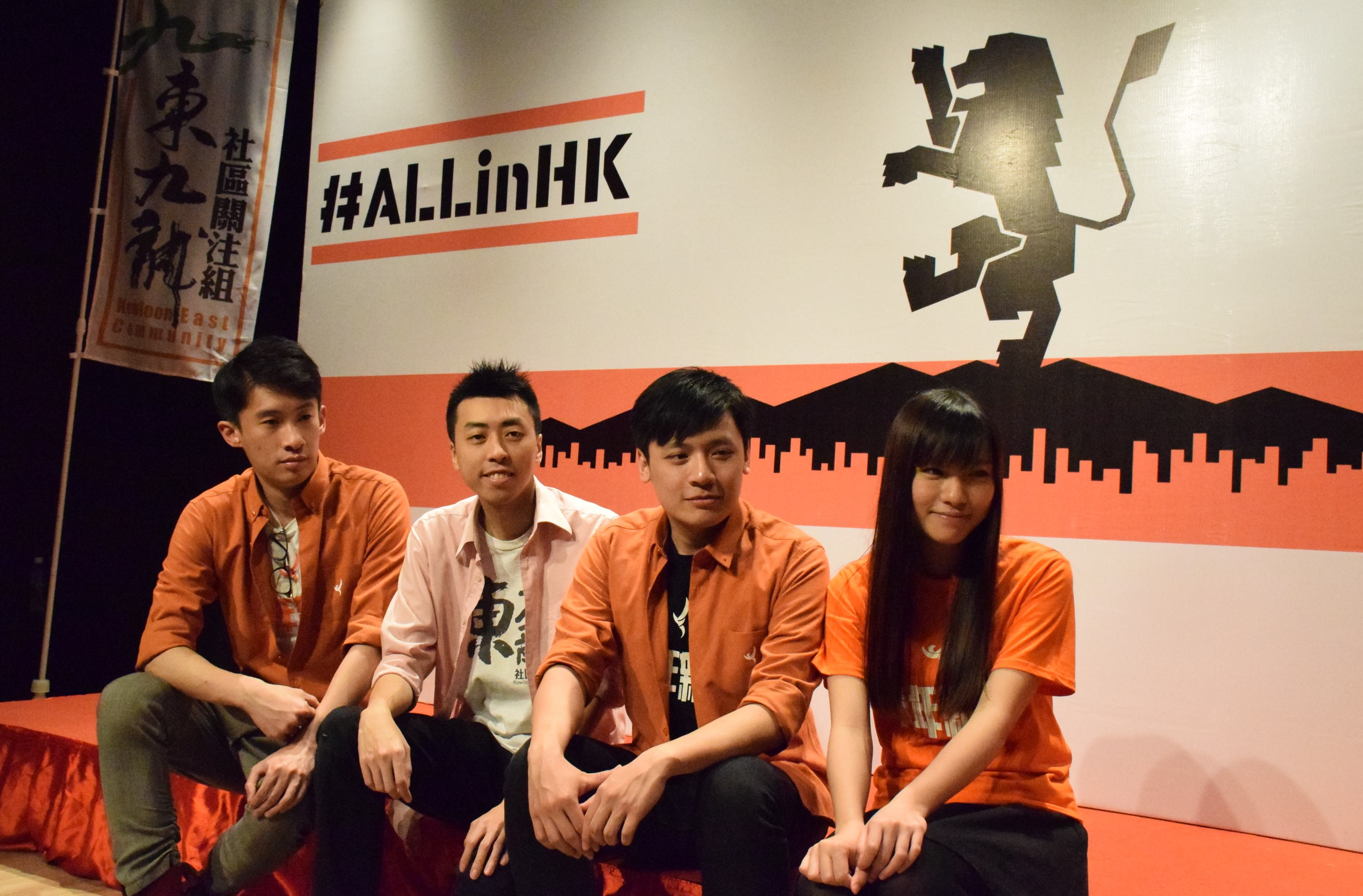
The four candidates of the alliance: Baggio Leung, Chan Chak-to, Wong Chun-kit and Yau Wai-ching. (from left to right)

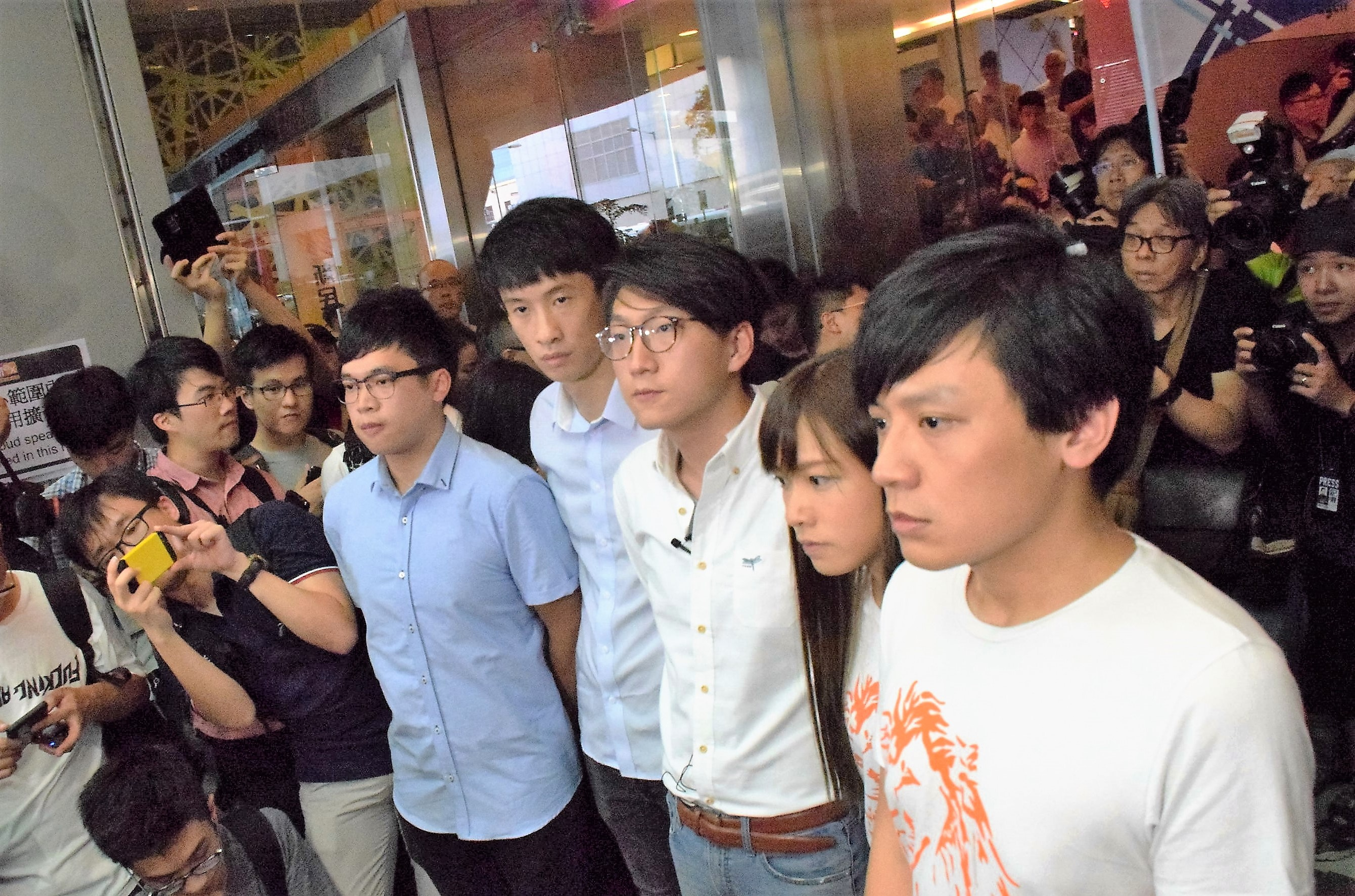
Baggio Leung and Li Tung-sing fielded their nominations as a backup plan before Edward Leung was disqualified.

It was formed on 10 April 2016 by the six localist groups with the agenda to put forward a referendum on Hong Kong's self-determination. It intended to field candidates in four of the five constituencies, Youngspiration's convenor Baggio Leung Chung-hang in Hong Kong Island, Yau Wai-ching in Kowloon West and Kenny Wong Chun-kit in New Territories West and Kowloon East Community's Chan Chak-to in Kowloon East, while supporting Hong Kong Indigenous' Edward Leung who received a better-than-expected result in the February by-election to run again.

Baggio Leung initially intended to run in Hong Kong Island, but later stood in New Territories West in Wong's list. However, in the wake of the Electoral Affairs Commission's measure against pro-independence candidates, he finally submitted his nomination to stand in New Territories East with former Hong Kong Indigenous member Li Tung-sing. He claimed to be his "substitute candidate" in case Edward Leung was disqualified. Although nominations of all candidates from the alliance were accepted, Edward Leung's nomination was invalidated on 2 August. On the same day, Edward Leung was hired as the co-ordinator of Youngspiration's campaign.

- Hong Kong Island: None
- Kowloon West: Yau Wai-ching (Youngspiration)
- Kowloon East: Chan Chak-to (Kowloon East Community)
- New Territories West: Wong Chun-kit (Youngspiration), Wong Pak-yu (Tin Shui Wai New Force)
- New Territories East: Sixtus "Baggio" Leung Chung-hang (Youngspiration), Li Tung-sing (Nonpartisan, former Hong Kong Indigenous member)

== Performance in elections ==
=== Legislative Council elections ===
| Election | Number of popular votes | % of popular votes | GC seats | FC seats | Total seats | +/− | Position |
|---|---|---|---|---|---|---|---|
| 2016 | 81,422 | 3.75 | 2 | 0 | 2 / 70 | 0 | 8th▲ |
