= 2016 Hong Kong legislative election in Kowloon East =

- 4 September 2016

All 5 Kowloon East seats to the Legislative Council
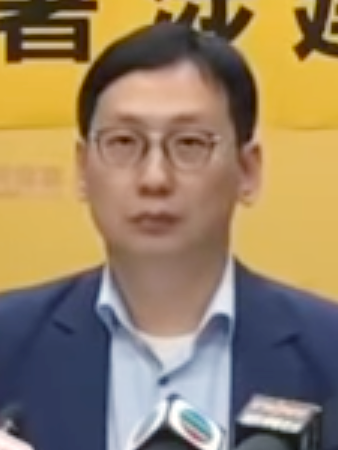

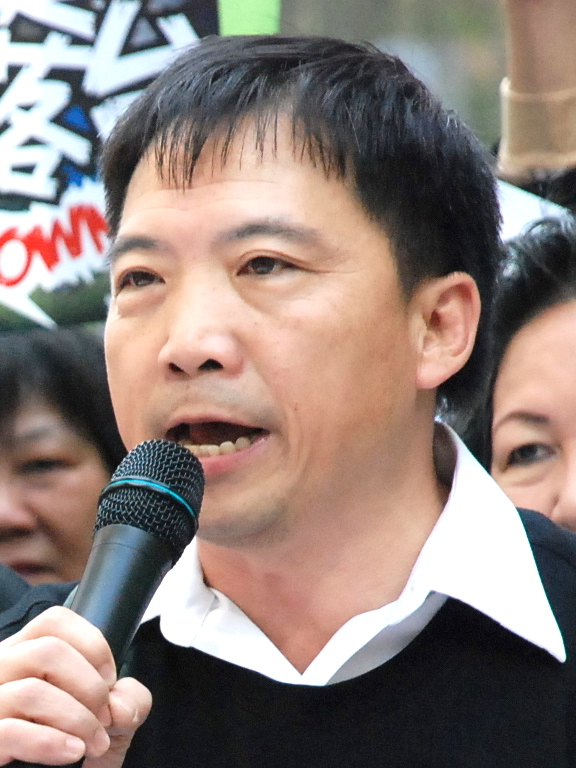

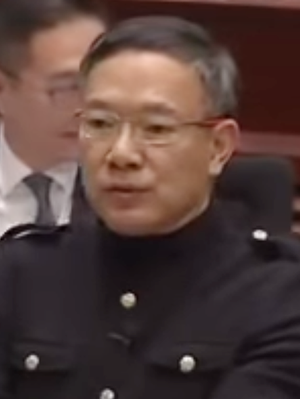

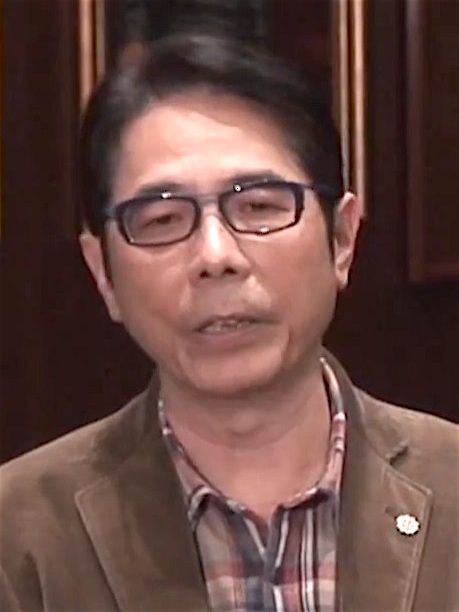

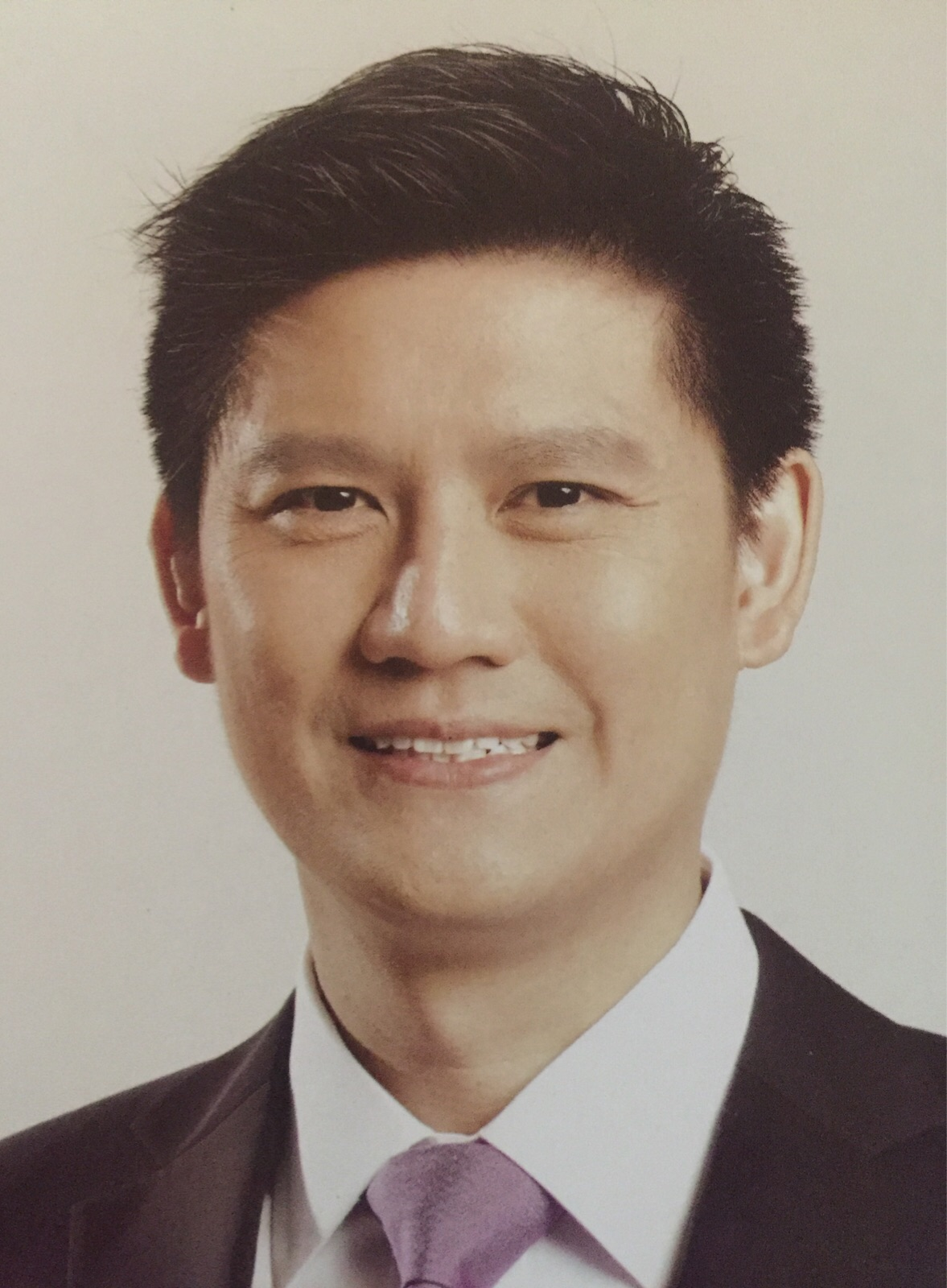
	First party	Second party	Third party
Leader	Wilson Or	Wu Chi-wai	Paul Tse
Party	DAB	Democratic	Independent
Alliance	Pro-Beijing	Pan-democracy	Pro-Beijing
Last election	1 seat, 16.7%	1 seat, 18.2%	1 seat, 13.5%
Seats before	1	1	1
Seats won	1	1	1
Seat change	Steady	Steady	Steady
Popular vote	51,516	50,309	47,527
Percentage	15.7%	15.3%	14.5%
Swing	▼1.0%	▼0.1%	▲1.0%
	Fourth party	Fifth party
Leader	Wong Kwok-kin	Jeremy Tam
Party	FTU	Civic
Alliance	Pro-Beijing	Pan-democracy
Last election	1 seat, 14.3%	1 seat, 14.6%
Seats before	1	1
Seats won	1	1
Seat change	Steady	Steady
Popular vote	47,318	45,408
Percentage	14.4%	13.8%
Swing	▲0.1%	▼0.8%
- Party with most votes in each District Council Constituency.

These are the Kowloon East results of the 2016 Hong Kong Legislative Council election. The election was held on 4 September 2016 and all 5 seats in Kowloon East where consisted of Wong Tai Sin District and Kwun Tong District were contested. The Pro-Beijing camp retained the majority of the Kowloon East seats. The Democratic Party, Democratic Alliance for the Betterment and Progress of Hong Kong, Federation of Trade Unions and Civic Party each secured their party's incumbent seat, as well as independent Paul Tse who won the last seat in the last election, with Wilson Or and Jeremy Tam first elected to the Legislative Council.

== Overall results ==
Before election:

↓
2	3
Anti-establishment	Pro-establishment

Change in composition:

↓
2	3
Anti-establishment	Pro-establishment

Party	Seats	Seats change	Contesting list(s)	Votes	%	% change
DAB	1	0	1	51,516	15.7	−1.0
FTU	1	0	1	47,318	14.4	+0.1
VLHK	0	0	1	2,444	0.7	N/A
Independent	1	0	1	47,527	14.5	N/A
Pro-Beijing camp	3	0	4	148,805	45.2	+0.7
Democratic	1	0	1	50,309	15.3	−0.1
Civic	1	0	1	45,408	13.8	−0.8
People Power	0	0	1	31,815	9.7	–3.2
Labour	0	0	1	2,535	0.8	N/A
Frontier	0	0	1	2,603	0.8	−1.2
Independent	0	0	1	1,393	0.4	N/A
Pro-democracy camp	2	0	6	131,528	40.0	−14.3
Civic Passion	0	0	1	33,271	10.1	N/A
KEC	0	0	1	12,854	3.9	N/A
Localist groups	0	0	2	46,125	14.0	N/A
Turnout:				328,993	56.0	+4.0

== Candidates list ==
Vote share
1. DAB (15.7%)
2. Democratic (15.3%)
3. FTU (14.4%)
4. Civic (13.8%)
5. Civic Passion (10.1%)
6. People Power (9.67%)
7. KEC (3.91%)
8. Frontier (0.79%)
9. VLHK (0.74%)
10. Other (15.7%)

Legislative Election 2016: Kowloon East
List	Candidates	Votes	Of total (%)	± from prev.
DAB	Wilson Or Chong-shing Joe Lai Wing-ho, Cheung Ki-tang	51,516	15.66	–0.99
Democratic	Wu Chi-wai Mok Kin-shing, Cheng Keng-ieong, Wu Chi-kin	50,309	15.29	–0.08
Nonpartisan	Paul Tse Wai-chun	47,527	14.45	+0.91
FTU	Wong Kwok-kin Chow Luen-kiu, Kan Ming-tung, Kwok Wang-hing	47,318	14.38	+0.04
Civic	Jeremy Jansen Tam Man-ho Alan Leong Kah-kit	45,408	13.80	–0.83
Civic Passion	Wong Yeung-tat	33,271	10.11	N/A
People Power	Tam Tak-chi	31,815	9.67	–3.18
KEC	Chan Chak-to	12,854	3.91	N/A
Frontier	Tam Heung-man	2,603	0.79	–1.17
Labour	Wu Sui-shan, Chiu Shi-shun	2,535	0.77	N/A
VLHK	Patrick Ko Tat-pun	2,444	0.74	N/A
Nonpartisan	Lui Wing-kei	1,393	0.42	N/A
Total valid votes		328,993	100	
Rejected ballots		7,754		
Turnout		336,738	55.98	+4.01
Registered electors		601,566		

== See also ==
- Legislative Council of Hong Kong
- Hong Kong legislative elections
- 2016 Hong Kong legislative election
