= Tsz Wan Shan Constructive Power =

Tsz Wan Shan Constructive Power 慈雲山建設力量
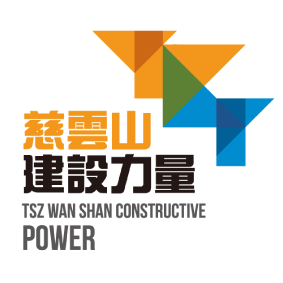
- Founded: January 2015
- Dissolved: 22 September 2021
- Ideology: Hong Kong localism Hong Kong nationalism Liberalism (HK)
- Regional affiliation: Pro-democracy camp
- Colours: Brown

Tsz Wan Shan Constructive Power (Chinese: 慈雲山建設力量) was a local political group based in Tsz Wan Shan of Wong Tai Sin District founded in January 2015 by a group of HKGolden netizens. Inspired by the Umbrella Revolution, the group contested in the 2015 District Council election but failed to win any seats. It won two seats in a historic pro-democracy landslide in 2019 District Council election.

== History ==
The group was formed in January 2015 by a group of HKGolden netizens attempting to prevent the pro-Beijing camp from running uncontested in the 2015 District Council election after the Umbrella Revolution. Members Mak Tsz-ho and Tam Chun-man ran in Ching Oi and Tsz Wan East against Democratic Alliance for the Betterment and Progress of Hong Kong (DAB) incumbents anti-Occupy lawyer Maggie Chan Man-ki and Ho Hon-man respectively but both failed to win a seat.

In 2016, the group formed an electoral alliance under the name "ALLinHK with five other localist groups: Youngspiration, Kowloon East Community, Tin Shui Wai New Force, Cheung Sha Wan Community Establishment Power, and Tuen Mun Community. It planned to field candidates in four of the five geographical constituencies with the agenda to put forward a referendum on Hong Kong's self-determination. Two Youngsipration candidates of the ALLinHK alliance Baggio Leung and Yau Wai-ching were elected, but were soon disqualified over the Hong Kong Legislative Council oath-taking controversy in October 2016.

The group made a second attempt in the 2019 District Council election amid the large scale anti-extradition protests, with Cheung Ka-yi and Sham Yu-hin contested in Fung Tak and Ching Oi. In the historic pro-democracy landslide, both candidates were elected by defeating the DAB opponents.

On 22 September 2021, the group announced its dissolution due it being unable to "move forward" after the crackdown following the 2019–2020 Hong Kong protests.

== Electoral performance ==
=== Wong Tai Sin District Council elections ===
Election	Number of popular votes	% of popular votes	Total elected seats	+/−
2015	3,633	3.50	0 / 25	0
2019	10,160▲	5.50▲	2 / 25	2▲
