= Hong Kong Golden =

Hong Kong Golden may refer to:

- Hong Kong Golden FC, a football team now known as Xiangxue Sun Hei.
- Hong Kong Golden Forum an internet forum about computing.
