= Cheung Sha Wan Community Establishment Power =

Cheung Sha Wan Community Establishment Power 長沙灣社區發展力量
- Convenor: Leos Lee
- Founded: 2015
- Dissolved: 22 September 2021
- Ideology: Localism (HK); Liberalism (HK); Hong Kong nationalism
- Regional affiliation: Pro-democracy camp
- Colours: Orange
- Legislative Council: 0 / 90
- Sham Shui Po District Council: 0 / 20

Cheung Sha Wan Community Establishment Power (Chinese: 長沙灣社區發展力量) was a local political group based in Cheung Sha Wan of Sham Shui Po District founded in 2015. Inspired by the Umbrella Revolution, the group contested in the 2015 District Council election but failed to win any seats. It won one seat in a historic pro-democracy landslide in 2019 District Council election, occupied by its convenor Leos Lee Man-ho.

== History ==
The group was formed in 2015 attempting to prevent the pro-Beijing camp from running uncontested in the 2015 District Council election after the Umbrella Revolution. Convenor Leos Lee Man-ho ran in Cheung Sha Wan against pro-Beijing incumbent Aaron Lam Ka-fai but failed to win a seat.

The group was vocal against the Copyright (Amendment) Bill 2014 in December 2015, worrying the proposed bill would further encroach freedom of speech in Hong Kong. It issued a statement with 11 other post-umbrella organisations pressuring the pro-democrats on tougher stance on the bill.

In 2016, the group formed an electoral alliance under the name "ALLinHK with five other localist groups: Youngspiration, Kowloon East Community, Tin Shui Wai New Force, Tsz Wan Shan Constructive Power, and Tuen Mun Community. It planned to field candidates in four of the five geographical constituencies with the agenda to put forward a referendum on Hong Kong's self-determination. Two Youngsipration candidates of the ALLinHK alliance Baggio Leung and Yau Wai-ching were elected, but were soon disqualified over the Hong Kong Legislative Council oath-taking controversy in October 2016.

The group made a second attempt in the 2019 District Council election amid the 2019–20 Hong Kong protests, with Leos Lee ran against Pong Chiu-fai. In the historic pro-democracy landslide, Lee was elected by defeating the BPA opponent.

The group was officially disbanded on 22 September 2021.

== Electoral performance ==
=== Wong Tai Sin District Council elections ===
| Election | Number of popular votes | % of popular votes | Total elected seats | +/− |
|---|---|---|---|---|
| 2015 | 1,307 | 1.51 | 0 / 23 | 0 |
| 2019 | 3,359▲ | 2.31▲ | 1 / 25 | 1▲ |
