= Tin Heng (constituency) =

Hong Kong constituency

- Elected constituency for the Yuen Long District Council
- Boundary of Tin Heng in Yuen Long District
- District: Yuen Long
- Legislative Council constituency: New Territories North
- Population: 20,465 (2019)
- Electorate: 13,951 (2019)

Current constituency
- Created: 2003
- Number of members: One
- Member: Vacant

Tin Heng (Chinese: 天恆) is one of the 39 constituencies in the Yuen Long District of Hong Kong. The constituency returns one district councillor to the Yuen Long District Council, with an election every four years.

Tin Heng constituency is loosely based on Tin Heng Estate in Tin Shui Wai with estimated population of 20,465.

== Councillors represented ==
Election	Member	Party
2003	Michael Luk Chung-hung	DAB/FTU
2007	Michael Luk Chung-hung	DAB/FTU
2011	Michael Luk Chung-hung	DAB/FTU→FTU
2015	Michael Luk Chung-hung	FTU
2019	Henry Wong Pak-yu→Vacant (Note: Resigned on 4 May 2021 after being arrested under national security law.)	Nonpartisan

== Election results ==
=== 2010s ===
Yuen Long District Council Election, 2019: Tin Heng
Party	Candidate	Votes	%	±%
Nonpartisan	Henry Wong Pak-yu	6,004	61.2	+34.4
FTU	Michael Luk Chung-hung	3,731	38.0	−18.0
Independent	Chan Ka-chun	37	0.4	–
Nonpartisan	Stanley Chan Chi-shing	37	0.4	–
Majority		2,273	23.2	N/A
Turnout		9,834	70.5	+27.5
Nonpartisan gain from FTU		Swing	+26.2	

Yuen Long District Council Election, 2015: Tin Heng
Party	Candidate	Votes	%	±%
FTU	Michael Luk Chung-hung	2,749	56.0	–
TSWNF	Henry Wong Pak-yu	1,317	26.8	–
Independent	Cheung Kwok-tung	846	17.2	–
Majority		1,432	29.2	–
Turnout		4,912	43.0	–
DAB hold		Swing	–	

Yuen Long District Council Election, 2011: Tin Heng
Party	Candidate	Votes	%	±%
DAB (FTU)	Luk Chung-hung	Unopposed		
DAB hold		Swing		

=== 2000s ===
Yuen Long District Council Election, 2007: Tin Heng
Party	Candidate	Votes	%	±%
DAB	Luk Chung-hung	2,820	69.8	+19.6
Democratic Alliance	Wong Siu-han	1,220	30.2	–
Majority		1,600	39.6	+15.3
Turnout		4,040	75.4	+17.0
DAB hold		Swing		

Yuen Long District Council Election, 2003: Tin Heng
Party	Candidate	Votes	%	±%
DAB	Luk Chung-hung	1,571	50.2	N/A
Independent	Wong Chi-fai	809	25.8	N/A
Independent	Cheung Chi-yuen	750	24.0	N/A
Majority		762	24.3	N/A
Turnout		3130	58.4	N/A
DAB win (new seat)				
