= Whampoa West (constituency) =

Constituency of the Kowloon City District Council, Hong Kong

- Elected constituency for the Kowloon City District Council
- Boundary of Whampoa West in Kowloon City District
- District: Kowloon City
- Legislative Council constituency: Kowloon Central
- Population: 20,898 (2019)
- Electorate: 9,979 (2019)

Current constituency
- Created: 1994
- Number of members: One
- Member: Vacant
- Created from: Whampoa

Whampoa West (Chinese: 黃埔西) is one of the 25 constituencies of the Kowloon City District Council. The seat elects one member of the council every four years. The seat has currently been held by independent Kwong Po-yin. The boundary is loosely based on the Western area of Whampoa Garden.

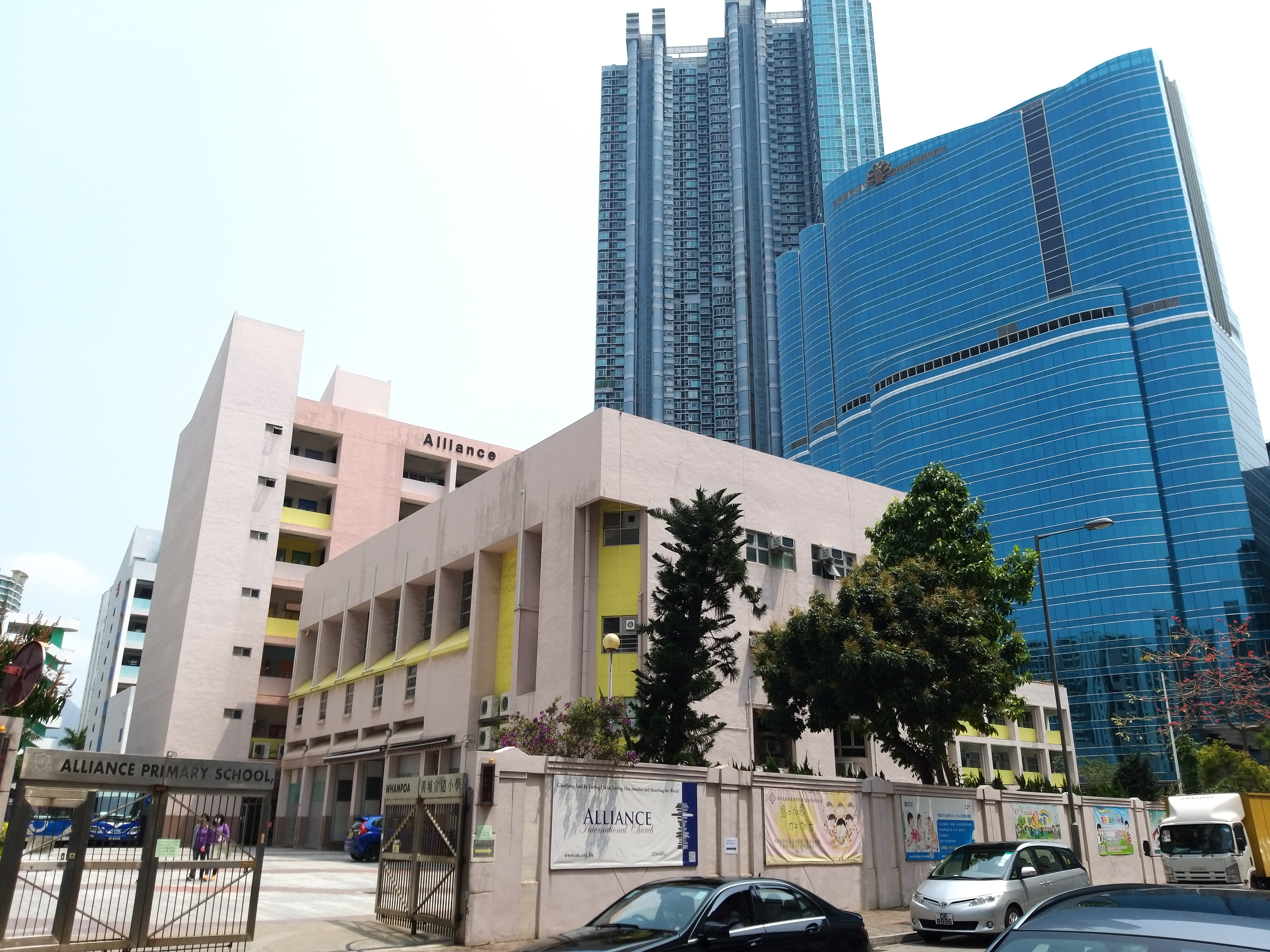
Alliance Primary School in Whampoa West

== Councillors represented ==
Election	Member	Party
1994	Lau Wai-wing	Nonpartisan
2015	Kwong Po-yin→Vacant (Note: Disqualified on 11 July 2021.)	Youngspiration
2016	Kwong Po-yin→Vacant	Nonpartisan

== Election results ==
=== 2010s ===
Kowloon City District Council Election, 2019: Whampoa West
Party	Candidate	Votes	%	±%
Nonpartisan	Kwong Po-yin	4,715	61.84	+11.34
Nonpartisan	Elaine Cheng Hiu-ling	2,910	38.16	
Majority		1,805	23.68	
Turnout		7,645	76.61	
Nonpartisan hold		Swing		

Kowloon City District Council Election, 2015: Whampoa West
Party	Candidate	Votes	%	±%
Youngspiration	Kwong Po-yin	2,114	50.5	
Nonpartisan	Lau Wai-wing	2,075	49.5	–14.6
Majority		39	1.0	–27.2
Turnout		4,243	49.9	
Youngspiration gain from Nonpartisan		Swing		

Kowloon City District Council Election, 2011: Whampoa West
Party	Candidate	Votes	%	±%
Nonpartisan	Lau Wai-wing	1,710	64.1	–0.9
Democratic	Lo Chun-kit	958	35.9	+0.9
Majority		752	28.2	–1.8
Nonpartisan hold		Swing	–0.9	

=== 2000s ===
Kowloon City District Council Election, 2007: Whampoa West
Party	Candidate	Votes	%	±%
Nonpartisan	Lau Wai-wing	1,716	65.0	+0.9
Democratic	Stephen Chan Chung-kong	925	35.0	
Majority		752	30.0	+1.8
Nonpartisan hold		Swing		

Kowloon City District Council Election, 2003: Whampoa West
Party	Candidate	Votes	%	±%
Nonpartisan	Lau Wai-wing	1,642	64.1	+6.2
Nonpartisan	Cheng Chee-kwok	919	35.9	
Majority		723	28.2	+12.1
Nonpartisan hold		Swing		

=== 1990s ===
Kowloon City District Council Election, 1999: Whampoa West
Party	Candidate	Votes	%	±%
Nonpartisan	Lau Wai-wing	1,149	57.9	+15.9
Democratic	Lam Kin-man	831	41.8	+7.8
Majority		318	16.1	+8.1
Nonpartisan hold		Swing		

Kowloon City District Board Election, 1994: Whampoa West
Party	Candidate	Votes	%	±%
Nonpartisan	Lau Wai-wing	758	42.0	
Democratic	Yeung Wing-hin	613	34.0	
Liberal	Lam Kin-man	417	23.1	
Majority		145	8.0	
Nonpartisan win (new seat)				
