= Cheung Sha Wan (constituency) =

- Elected constituency for the Sham Shui Po District Council
- Boundary of Cheung Sha Wan in Sham Shui Po District
- District: Sham Shui Po
- Legislative Council constituency: Kowloon West
- Population: 15,757 (2019)
- Electorate: 7,318 (2019)

Current constituency
- Created: 1982
- Number of members: One
- Member(s): Vacant

Cheung Sha Wan is one of the 21 constituencies of the Sham Shui Po District Council. The seat elects one member of the council every four years. The boundary is loosely based on the area of Cheung Sha Wan and Sham Shui Po bounded by Pratas Street, Cheung Sha Wan Road, Yen Chow Street and Tai Po Road.

== Councillors represented ==
=== 1982 to 1985 ===
Election	Member	Party
1982	Wong Ping-hon	Nonpartisan

=== 1985 to 1994 ===
Election	First Member	Party	Second Member	Party
1985	Yau Lai-ngor	Nonpartisan	Wong Ping-hon	Nonpartisan
1991	James To Kun-sun	United Democrat	Eric Wong Chung-ki	ADPL
1994	James To Kun-sun	Democratic	Eric Wong Chung-ki	ADPL

=== 1994 to present ===
Election	Member	Party
1994	Aaron Lam Ka-fai	Independent
2008	Aaron Lam Ka-fai	KWND
2012	Aaron Lam Ka-fai	BPA/KWND
2019	Leos Lee Man-ho	CSWCEP

== Election results ==
=== 2010s ===
Sham Shui Po District Council Election, 2019: Cheung Sha Wan
Party	Candidate	Votes	%	±%
CSWCEP	Leos Lee Man-ho	3,359	64.67	+21.74
BPA	Pong Chiu-fai	2,103	38.22	−10.77
Nonpartisan	Yip Chi-ho	41	0.75	
Majority		1,256	26.45	
Turnout		5,519	75.43	
CSWCEP gain from BPA		Swing		

Sham Shui Po District Council Election, 2015: Cheung Sha Wan
Party	Candidate	Votes	%	±%
BPA (KWND)	Aaron Lam Ka-fai	1,491	48.99	
CSWCEP	Leos Lee Man-ho	1,307	42.93	
Nonpartisan	Lam Shui-hum	246	8.08	
Majority		184	6.06	
Turnout		3,044	45.35	
BPA hold		Swing		

Sham Shui Po District Council Election, 2011: Cheung Sha Wan
Party	Candidate	Votes	%	±%
KWND	Aaron Lam Ka-fai	Uncontested		
KWND hold		Swing		

=== 2000s ===
Sham Shui Po District Council Election, 2007: Cheung Sha Wan
Party	Candidate	Votes	%	±%
Independent	Aaron Lam Ka-fai	1,268	61.52	
LSD	So Tsz-wing	793	38.48	
Majority		475	23.04	
Independent hold		Swing		

Sham Shui Po District Council Election, 2003: Cheung Sha Wan
Party	Candidate	Votes	%	±%
Independent	Aaron Lam Ka-fai	Uncontested		
Independent hold		Swing		

=== 1990s ===
Sham Shui Po District Council Election, 1999: Cheung Sha Wan
Party	Candidate	Votes	%	±%
Independent	Aaron Lam Ka-fai	1,093	54.11	+1.86
Democratic	Wong Sau-ting	927	45.89	
Majority		166	8.22	
Independent hold		Swing		

Sham Shui Po District Board Election, 1994: Cheung Sha Wan
Party	Candidate	Votes	%	±%
Independent	Aaron Lam Ka-fai	1,068	52.25	
ADPL	Yim Chun-ming	976	47.75	+18.79
Majority		92	4.50	
Independent gain from Democratic		Swing		

Sham Shui Po District Board Election, 1991: Cheung Sha Wan
Party	Candidate	Votes	%	±%
United Democrats	James To Kun-sun	2,878	44.05	
ADPL	Eric Wong Chung-ki	1,892	28.96	
Nonpartisan	Wong Ping-hon	1,763	26.99	−6.95
United Democrats gain from Nonpartisan		Swing		
ADPL gain from Nonpartisan		Swing		

=== 1980s ===
Sham Shui Po District Board Election, 1988: Cheung Sha Wan
Party	Candidate	Votes	%	±%
Nonpartisan	Yau Lai-ngor	2,350	38.42	−4.00
Nonpartisan	Wong Ping-hon	2,076	33.94	−0.95
Nonpartisan	Lee Yiu-man	1,691	27.64	
Nonpartisan hold		Swing		
Nonpartisan hold		Swing		

Sham Shui Po District Board Election, 1985: Cheung Sha Wan
Party	Candidate	Votes	%	±%
Nonpartisan	Yau Lai-ngor	3,048	42.42	
Nonpartisan	Wong Ping-hon	2,507	34.89	−12.99
Reform	Yu Hung-kong	1,630	22.69	
Nonpartisan win (new seat)				
Nonpartisan hold		Swing		

Sham Shui Po District Board Election, 1982: Cheung Sha Wan
Party	Candidate	Votes	%	±%
Nonpartisan	Wong Ping-hon	1,703	47.88	
Reform	Yu Hung-kong	1,055	29.66	
Nonpartisan	Yuen Wun-kai	799	22.46	
Majority		648	18.22	
Nonpartisan win (new seat)				
