= Fung Tak (constituency) =

- Elected constituency for the Wong Tai Sin District Council
- Boundary of Fung Tak in Wong Tai Sin District
- District: Wong Tai Sin
- Legislative Council constituency: Kowloon Central
- Population: 15,606 (2019)
- Electorate: 11,527 (2019)

Current constituency
- Created: 1994
- Number of members: One
- Member: (Vacant)

Fung Tak
- Traditional Chinese: 鳳德
Transcriptions
Yue: Cantonese
- Yale Romanization: Fuhng dāk
- Jyutping: Fung6 dak1

Fung Tak is one of the 25 constituencies in the Wong Tai Sin District in Hong Kong. The constituency returns one district councillor to the Wong Tai Sin District Council, with an election every four years.

The constituency has an estimated population of 15,606.

== Councillors represented ==
Election	Member	Party
1994	Lee Kwok-keung	Democratic
1999	Kan Chi-ho	DAB
2019	Cheung Ka-yi→Vacant	TWSCP

== Election results ==
=== 2010s ===
Wong Tai Sin District Council Election, 2019: Fung Tak
Party	Candidate	Votes	%	±%
TWSCP	Kathy Cheung Ka-yi	4,396	56.1	
DAB	Yuet Ngai-keung	3,436	43.9	−12.2
Majority		960	12.2	
Turnout		7,873	69.4	
TWSCP gain from DAB		Swing		

Wong Tai Sin District Council Election, 2015: Fung Tak
Party	Candidate	Votes	%	±%
DAB	Kan Chi-ho	2,766	56.1	
Nonpartisan	Wong Kowk-keung	2,168	43.9	
Majority		598	12.1	
Turnout				
DAB hold		Swing		

Wong Tai Sin District Council Election, 2011: Fung Tak
Party	Candidate	Votes	%	±%
DAB	Kan Chi-ho	2,498	54.1	
Nonpartisan	Wong Kwok-keung	1,898	41.1	
Nonpartisan	Ferdinand Fu Moon-fong	220	4.8	
Majority		600	13	
Turnout				
DAB hold		Swing		

=== 2000s ===
Wong Tai Sin District Council Election, 2007: Fung Tak
Party	Candidate	Votes	%	±%
DAB	Kan Chi-ho	2,971	61.7	
Nonpartisan	Wong Shun-yin	987	20.5	
Nonpartisan	Wong Kwok-keung	855	17.8	
Majority		1,984	41.2	
Turnout				
DAB hold		Swing		

Wong Tai Sin District Council Election, 2003: Fung Tak
Party	Candidate	Votes	%	±%
DAB	Kan Chi-ho	2,977	65.4	
Nonpartisan	Chung Chun-kuen	1,575	34.6	
Majority		1,402	30.8	
Turnout				
DAB hold		Swing		

=== 1990s ===
Wong Tai Sin District Council Election, 1999: Fung Tak
Party	Candidate	Votes	%	±%
DAB	Kan Chi-ho	2,573	52.0	
Nonpartisan	Lee Kwok-keung	1,834	37.0	
Nonpartisan	Chung Chun-kuen	544	11.0	
Majority		739	14.9	
Turnout				
DAB win (new seat)				
