= Lok Wah North (constituency) =

Hong Kong constituency

- Elected constituency for the Kwun Tong District Council
- Boundary of Lok Wah North in Kwun Tong District
- District: Kwun Tong
- Legislative Council constituency: Kowloon East
- Population: 12,479 (2019)
- Electorate: 8,356 (2019)

Current constituency
- Created: 1991
- Number of members: One
- Member: Wong Chi-ken (KEC)

Lok Wah North
- Traditional Chinese: 樂華北
Transcriptions
Yue: Cantonese
- Yale Romanization: Lohk wàah bāk
- Jyutping: Lok6 waa4 bak1

Lok Wah North is one of the 37 constituencies in the Kwun Tong District of Hong Kong which was created in 1991.

The constituency loosely covers part of Lok Wah Estate with the estimated population of 12,479.

== Councillors represented ==
Election	Member	Party
1991	Szeto Chak	Nonpartisan
1994	Steven Hung Chung-fun	Democratic
1999	Fung Kam-yuen	Nonpartisan
2015	Wong Chi-ken	KEC

== Election results ==
=== 2010s ===
Kwun Tong District Council Election, 2019: Lok Wah North
Party	Candidate	Votes	%	±%
Nonpartisan	Wong Chi-ken	3,628	60.73	
FTU	Liang Li	2,346	39.27	
Majority		1,282	21.46	
Turnout		5,997	71.82	
Nonpartisan hold		Swing		

Kwun Tong District Council Election, 2015: Lok Wah North
Party	Candidate	Votes	%	±%
KEC	Wong Chi-ken	1,729	58.1	
Nonpartisan	Fung Kam-yuen	1,246	41.9	–14.2
Majority		483	16.2	+3.2
Turnout		3,037	40.1	
KEC gain from Nonpartisan		Swing		

Kwun Tong District Council Election, 2011: Lok Wah North
Party	Candidate	Votes	%	±%
Nonpartisan	Fung Kam-yuen	1,739	56.1	+14.3
LSD	Yeung Kwok-hung	1,363	43.9	+12.7
Majority		376	13.0	+2.4
Nonpartisan hold		Swing		

=== 2000s ===
Kwun Tong District Council Election, 2007: Lok Wah North
Party	Candidate	Votes	%	±%
Nonpartisan	Fung Kam-yuen	1,352	41.8	–14.3
LSD	Yeung Kwok-hung	1,011	31.2	
Nonpartisan	Law Lai-kuen	875	27.0	
Majority		341	10.6	–13.2
Nonpartisan hold		Swing		

Kwun Tong District Council Election, 2003: Lok Wah North
Party	Candidate	Votes	%	±%
Nonpartisan	Fung Kam-yuen	1,950	56.1	–4.9
Nonpartisan	Michelle Li Pui-ying	1,124	32.3	
Nonpartisan	Yau Koon-nin	275	7.9	
Nonpartisan	Chau Kin-ping	129	3.7	
Majority		826	23.8	+0.8
Nonpartisan hold		Swing		

=== 1990s ===
Kwun Tong District Council Election, 1999: Lok Wah North
Party	Candidate	Votes	%	±%
Nonpartisan	Fung Kam-yuen	2,058	61.0	
Nonpartisan	Chan Hing-cheong	1,282	38.0	
Majority		776	23.0	–7.5
Nonpartisan hold		Swing		

Kwun Tong District Board Election, 1994: Lok Wah North
Party	Candidate	Votes	%	±%
Democratic	Steven Hung Chung-fun	1,870	65.0	
Nonpartisan	Yuen Mei-kuen	994	34.5	
Majority		876	30.5	
Democratic gain from Nonpartisan		Swing		

Kwun Tong District Board Election, 1991: Lok Wah North
Party	Candidate	Votes	%	±%
Nonpartisan	Szeto Chak	Uncontested		
Nonpartisan win (new seat)				
