= Wong Pak-yu =

Hong Kong politician and activist

- 王百羽
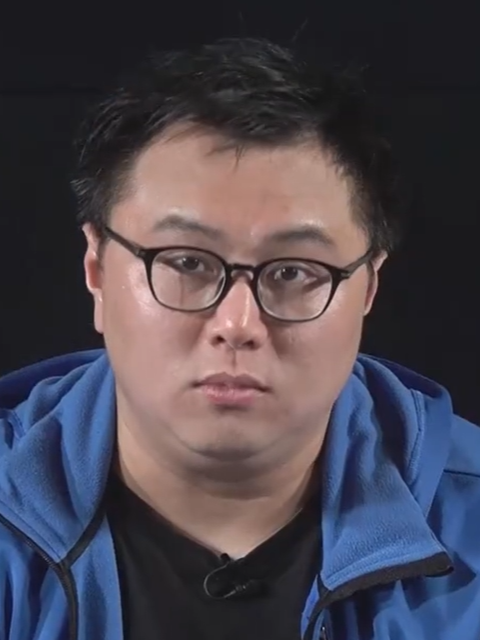
- Wong in the 2020 pro-democracy primaries

Member of the Yuen Long District Council
- In office 1 January 2020 – 4 May 2021
- Preceded by: Luk Chung-hung
- Constituency: Tin Heng

Personal details
- Born: 15 February 1991 (age 35) British Hong Kong
- Citizenship: Hong Kong
- Education: Hong Kong University of Science and Technology

Henry Wong Pak-yu (Chinese: 王百羽; born 15 February 1991) is a Hong Kong politician and social activist. He is the spokesman of the local community group Tin Shui Wai New Force and also a member of the Information Technology subsector in the Election Committee. In 2019, he won in the District Council election and became a member the Yuen Long District Council for Tin Heng.

== Biography ==
Wong graduated from the Hong Kong University of Science and Technology (HKUST) with a Bachelor of Engineering degree, majoring in Computer Science and Engineering. He started his career in the financial industry as an IT Support/Help Desk Engineer. Inspired by the Umbrella Revolution, Wong joined the Tin Shui Wai New Force at the end of 2014 and later became a spokesperson of the organisation.

Wong participated in the 2015 District Council election, running in Tin Heng against incumbent Luk Chung-hung of the pro-Beijing Hong Kong Federation of Trade Unions (FTU). He received 26.8% of the vote, losing the election to Luk. He also stood as a second candidate with Wong Chun-kit of the localist camp Youngspiration in the 2016 Legislative Council election. His ticket received 9,928 votes, ranking 14th place and was not elected. In the December Election Committee Subsector elections, Wong ran in the Information Technology subsector under the "IT Vision" banner. He was elected as one of the 1,200 electors who had the power to elect the Chief Executive in 2017. Wong nominated retired judge Woo Kwok-hing, but decided to cast a blank vote in the election to protest the undemocratic electoral system.

In 2019, Wong challenged Luk Chung-hung again in the 2019 District Council election within the Tin Heng constituency. Riding with the pro-democracy wave amid the anti-extradition protests, Wong defeated Luk with 61.2% of the votes and was elected to the Yuen Long District Council.

In July 2020, Wong ran in the pro-democracy primaries for the 2020 Legislative Council election in the District Council (Second) constituency. With 71,706 votes, he came in third after Kwong Chun-yu and Lester Shum, while surpassing James To, the longest-serving incumbent lawmaker. Wong was nominated as one of the four candidates in the general election.

On 22 November 2020, Wong, together with Kowloon City's district councillor Timothy Lee Hin-long, were arrested by commercial crime police. They were accused of making false documents to "cheat the government" out of nearly HK$5 million for election expenses in relation to the postponed 2020 Legislative Council elections. Moreover, a large collection of imitation firearms (8 rifles, 17 pistols, imitation ammunition and a wooden bow) was found at Wong's home; as a consequence, he was additionally charged with possession of imitation firearms.

On 6 January 2021, Wong was among 53 members of the pro-democratic camp who were arrested under the national security law, specifically its provision regarding alleged subversion. The group stood accused of the organisation of and participation in the primary elections of July 2020. Wong was released on bail on 7 January.

On 28 February 2021, Wong was charged, along with 46 others, for subversion. He was denied bail in September, with a judgement releasing in 11 October considering the argument of the prosecution that his active participation of international front, which is calling for sanctions against Hong Kong and Chinese government officials.

Political offices
Preceded by Luk Chung-hung	Member of Yuen Long District Council; Representative for Tin Heng; 2020–2021	Vacant
