= Luk Chung-hung =

Hong Kong politician (born 1978)

- 陸頌雄
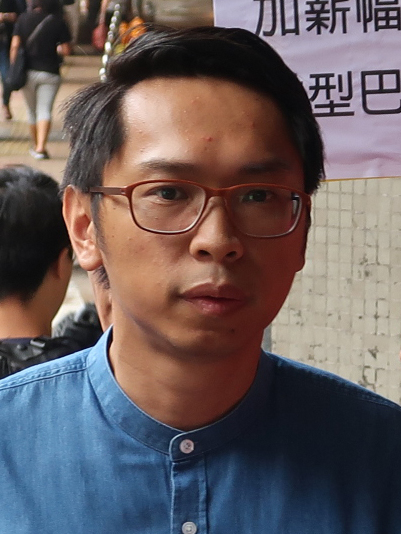

Member of the Legislative Council
- In office 1 January 2022 – 31 December 2025
- Preceded by: New constituency
- Constituency: Election Committee
- In office 1 October 2016 – 31 December 2021 Serving with Ho Kai-ming, Poon Siu-ping
- Preceded by: Tang Ka-piu
- Succeeded by: Kwok Wai-keung
- Constituency: Labour

Member of the Yuen Long District Council
- In office 1 January 2003 – 31 December 2019
- Preceded by: New constituency
- Succeeded by: Wong Pak-yu
- Constituency: Tin Heng

Personal details
- Born: September 21, 1978 (age 48) Hong Kong
- Party: Hong Kong Federation of Trade Unions
- Other political affiliations: Democratic Alliance for the Betterment and Progress of Hong Kong

Michael Luk Chung-hung (Chinese: 陸頌雄; born 21 September 1978) is a Hong Kong politician. He is a member of the Hong Kong Federation of Trade Unions (HKFTU) and the Democratic Alliance for the Betterment and Progress of Hong Kong (DAB). He was also member of the Yuen Long District Council since 2003 until 2019 for Tin Heng constituency and member of the Legislative Council of Hong Kong for Labour functional constituency elected in the 2016 Hong Kong Legislative Council election. He lost his district council seat in 2019 following a rout of pro-Beijing candidates amidst the 2019–20 Hong Kong protests. He lost his Legislative Council seat in 2025 election with only 23,282 votes, running fourth in place.

In March 2021, Luk claimed that the BBC "specializes in doing fake news to smear China and Hong Kong for its political goals."

In March 2021, Luk supported for cotton from Xinjiang in mainland China, after some companies had expressed concerns about human rights abuses, and said products from mainland China are also of quality.

In January 2022, Luk urged the public to stop focusing on an event where many government officials attended a large birthday party for Witman Hung Wai-man, and to instead focus on alleged mistakes by Cathay Pacific crew instead.

Political offices
| New constituency | Member of Yuen Long District Council; Representative for Tin Heng; 2003–2019 | Succeeded by Henry Wong Pak-yu |
Legislative Council of Hong Kong
| Preceded by Kwok Wai-keung; Tang Ka-piu | Member of Legislative Council; Representative for Labour; 2016–2021; Served alongside: Ho Kai-ming, Poon Siu-ping | Succeeded by Kwok Wai-keung |
| New constituency | Member of Legislative Council; Representative for Election Committee; 2022–present | Incumbent |
Order of precedence
| Preceded by Hui Chi-fung; Member of the Legislative Council | Hong Kong order of precedence Member of the Legislative Council | Succeeded by Lau Kwok-fan; Member of the Legislative Council |
