= Baggio Leung =

Hong Kong activist and politician

- 梁頌恆
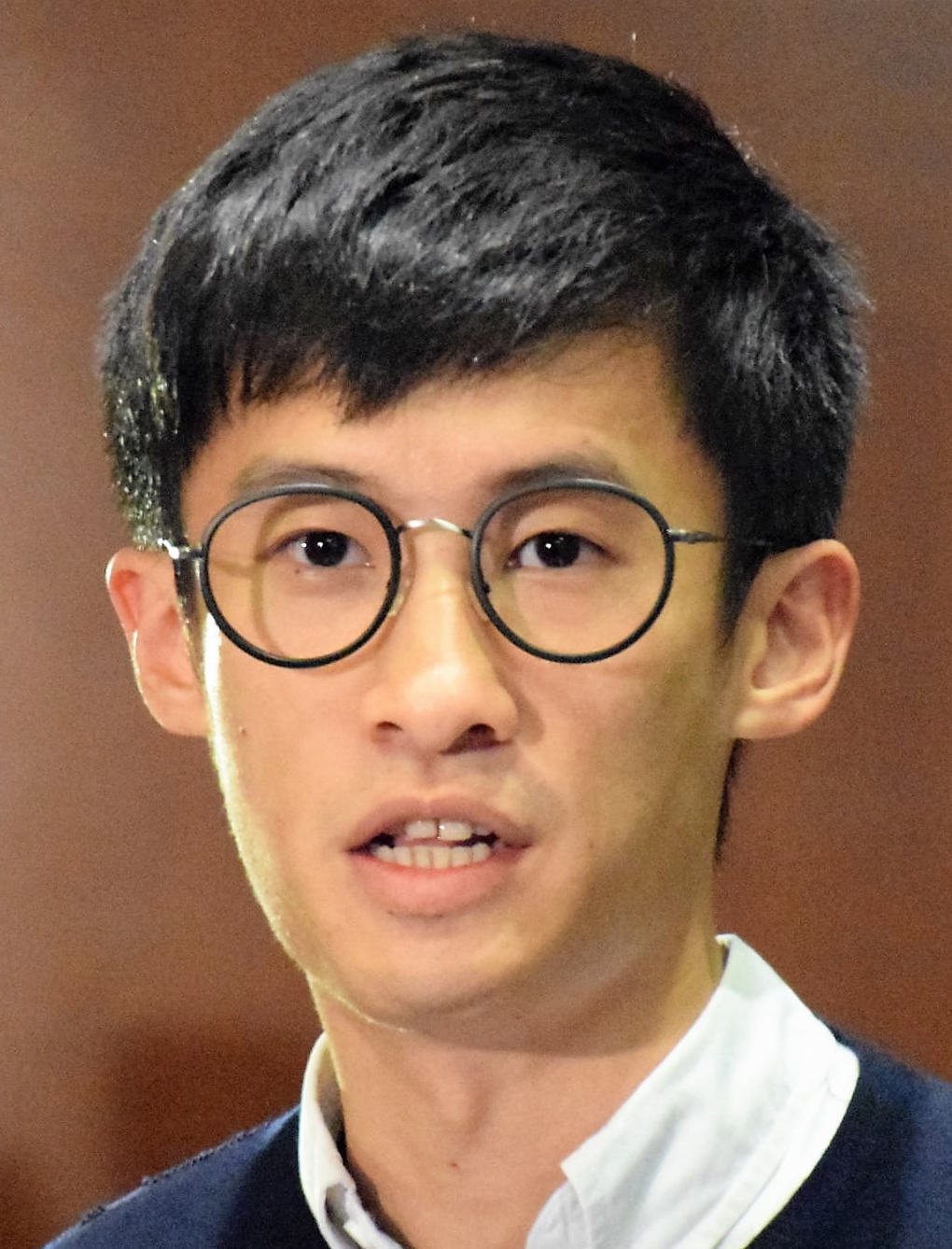
- Leung in October 2016

Convenor of Youngspiration
- Incumbent
- Assumed office 21 January 2015
- Preceded by: Position Established

Member of the Legislative Council
- In office 1 October 2016 – 15 November 2016 (Note: Leung never actually took the seat as member of the Legislative Council as his oath on 12 October 2016 was invalidated and his seat was vacated on 15 November 2016 according to the ruling of the Court of First Instance.)
- Preceded by: Gary Fan
- Succeeded by: Gary Fan
- Constituency: New Territories East

President of the City University of Hong Kong Students' Union
- In office 1 January 2007 – 31 December 2007

Personal details
- Born: Sixtus Leung Chung-hang; 7 August 1986 (age 40) British Hong Kong
- Party: Youngspiration (2015–2020); Hong Kong National Front (2018–present)
- Education: City University of Hong Kong

Baggio Leung
- Traditional Chinese: 梁頌恆
- Simplified Chinese: 梁颂恒
Transcriptions
Standard Mandarin
- Hanyu Pinyin: Liáng Sònghéng
Yue: Cantonese
- Yale Romanization: Lèuhng Juhng hàhng
- Jyutping: Loeng^{4} Zung^{6} hang^{4}

Sixtus "Baggio" Leung Chung-hang (Note: Leung is nicknamed "Baggio" as his favourite childhood footballer was Roberto Baggio.) (Chinese: 梁頌恆; born 7 August 1986) is a Hong Kong activist and politician. He is the convenor of Youngspiration, a localist political group in Hong Kong that leans towards Hong Kong independence, and is also leader and spokesperson of the pro-independence Hong Kong National Front. He was elected to the Legislative Council of Hong Kong as a member for New Territories East in the 2016 Hong Kong Legislative Council election. Triggered by his actions to make an independence political statement during the oath-taking ceremony, he faced a legal challenge from the government and was later stripped of his office by the court on 15 November 2016.

== Background ==
Leung graduated from the City University of Hong Kong and was the president of the City University of Hong Kong Students' Union in 2007. It was reported that he supported the government's appointment of Way Kuo to be the president of the City University of Hong Kong and developed a close relationship with the Chinese Liaison Office in Hong Kong. Leung later admitted that they have met but he did not agree with their stance. He became a digital marketer after his graduation.

In January 2015, Leung established Youngspiration with a group of like-minded people who participated in the 2014 Occupy protests, often dubbed the "Umbrella Movement". It stands on a localist platform, against the influx of Chinese immigrants and tourists. In the 2015 District Council election, Youngspiration fielded nine candidates, in which Leung himself stood in Kwun Lung against pro-Beijing Democratic Alliance for the Betterment and Progress of Hong Kong (DAB) Yeung Hoi-wing who succeeded veteran Ip Kwok-him. Leung lost the election by a margin of about 900 votes. Only one of the nine Youngspiration candidates was elected.

== Legislative Councillor and disqualification ==
In the 2016 Legislative Council election, Youngspiration formed an electoral alliance under the name of "ALLinHK" with other newly founded Umbrella groups. Leung planned to stand in the Hong Kong Island constituency but later stood in New Territories West. He withdrew his nomination at the last moment and led his own ticket in New Territories East as a backup plan right before Hong Kong Indigenous' Edward Leung was disqualified by the Electoral Affairs Commission (EAC) for his pro-independence stance. Baggio Leung was elected, receiving 37,997 votes.

On 12 October 2016 in the first meeting of the session, Leung and his party colleague Yau Wai-ching inserted their own words into the official script and had their oaths rejected. They were criticised for pronouncing China as "Jee-na", a term considered derogatory since the Second Sino-Japanese War, and Yau was mispronouncing "People's Republic of China" as "people's re-fucking of Jee-na". As a result, their qualification as legislators was challenged by the government in court. The National People's Congress Standing Committee (NPCSC) intervened in the court case by interpreting Article 104 of the Basic Law of Hong Kong to "clarify" the provision of the legislators to swear allegiance to Hong Kong as part of China when they take office, by insisting oath taking be conducted sincerely and accurately, and later stating that China would firmly oppose Hong Kong independence. On 15 November 2016, the court vacated the two legislators' seats on the grounds they did not take their oaths "faithfully and truthfully".

On 26 August 2017, the Court of Final Appeal of Hong Kong refused to appeal the case as they did not have a reasonably arguable case. Leung and Yau were found to have manifestly refused and wilfully omitted to take their oath – an act classed as declining and neglecting it.

In May 2020, Leung faced a court ruling where the Legislative Council Commission demanded a repayment of HK$930,000 (US$120,000). The commission claimed he mistakenly received the funds and salary intended for lawmakers. A bankruptcy order was asked to be petitioned against him. Speaking about the legal proceedings, Leung remarked on his preparedness and that "being declared bankrupt was minor compared to being jailed for life under Beijing’s new national security law for Hong Kong."

== Exile ==
On 11 December 2020, a group of exiled Hong Kong citizens reported that Leung had left the city and fled to the United States on 30 November and that he was seeking asylum.

Leung later confirmed this from Washington, D.C., and said he hoped to meet with advisers to President-elect Joe Biden to discuss sanctions on China over its "treatment of Hong Kong".

In July 2023, Leung was added to a "wanted list" by the government of Hong Kong, along with several other exiled activists.

== Notes ==
Party political offices
New title	Convenor of Youngspiration; 2015–present	Incumbent
Legislative Council of Hong Kong
Preceded by Gary Fan	Member of Legislative Council; Representative for New Territories East; 2016	Succeeded by Gary Fan
