= Youngspiration =

Former localist political party in Hong Kong

Youngspiration 青年新政
- Founded: 21 January 2015
- Membership: ▲ ~400
- Ideology: Hong Kong nationalism Localism (Hong Kong); Populism
- Regional affiliation: Localist camp
- Colours: Orange
- Legislative Council: 0 / 90
- District Councils: 0 / 470

Website
- https://web.archive.org/web/20171108030323/http://youngspiration.hk/

Youngspiration
- Chinese: 青年新政
- Literal meaning: Youth new policy
Transcriptions
Standard Mandarin
- Hanyu Pinyin: Qīngnián Xīnzhèng
Yue: Cantonese
- Yale Romanization: Chīng nìhn sān jing
- Jyutping: Cing^{1} nin^{4} san^{1} zing^{3}

Youngspiration was a localist political party in Hong Kong founded in 2015. It emerged after the 2014 Hong Kong protests (often dubbed as the "Umbrella Revolution") with an agenda of protection of Hong Kong people's interests and culture against the interference of the Chinese government and advocated the "Hong Kong nation's right to self-determination". The group wanted a self-determination referendum in 2020 with the results effective in 2047, when China's "one country, two systems" promise ends. As of 2016, the convenor of the group is Baggio Leung.

Youngspiration was part of the localist electoral alliance ALLinHK in the 2016 legislative election and won two seats in the direct elections. Baggio Leung and Yau Wai-ching, the two Youngspiration democratic elected legislators, triggered a controversy when they made pro-independence statements "Hong Kong is not China" during the oaths of office with insult words to China and were ejected from the Legislative Council by the court after the National People's Congress Standing Committee (NPCSC) interpreted the Article 104 of the Basic Law of Hong Kong, which specifically targeted the duo's conduct by "clarifying" the provision of the legislators to swear allegiance to Hong Kong as part of China when they take office.

== History ==
=== Founding and activism ===
Youngspiration was established in January 2015 by a group of young people who had participated in the 2014 Hong Kong protests. Its founding convenor, Baggio Leung, was the president of the City University of Hong Kong Students' Union in 2007. Due to its background, it was often labelled as one of the "umbrella organisations". It adopted the emerging localist ideology, claiming to safeguard Hong Kong people's interests, freedoms and culture against the influx of mainland Chinese immigrants and tourists as well as the Chinese government's growing encroachment on the territory. It supported the restriction of Chinese immigrants and the empowerment of the Hong Kong government to regulate and manage the one-way permit scheme.

In July 2015, Youngspiration organised a protest to demand deportation of an undocumented 12-year-old mainland boy Siu Yau-wai, who lived in Hong Kong for nine years without identification. Siu, whose parents are alive and well in mainland China, stayed with his grandparents after having overstayed his two-way permit nine years ago. Some called on the authorities to consider the case on a humanitarian basis and grant Siu permanent citizenship while Youngspiration worried that the case would open the floodgates to appeals from other illegal immigrants, asked for the boy to be repatriated. The boy and his grandmother were constantly harassed and eventually gave up and returned to his parents in mainland China.

=== 2015/16 elections ===
In the 2015 District Council election, Youngspiration fielded nine candidates, in which three of them ran against the pan-democratic Democratic Party. Physician Kwong Po-yin defeated the then-incumbent Chairman of the Kowloon City District Council Lau Wai Wing, becoming the only Youngspiration candidate elected as a member of the Kowloon City District Council, representing the Whampoa West constituency. Kwong later left Youngspiration in June 2016.

Youngspiration also called for a primary with the pan-democratic Civic Party for the 2016 New Territories East by-election after the incumbent ex-Civic legislator Ronny Tong resigned, despite drawing differences between the pan-democracy camp and themselves. They withdrew after meeting with the Civic Party and endorsed the candidacy of Edward Leung of the Hong Kong Indigenous, who ran under the localist banner for the first time.

In the 2016 Legislative Council election, Youngpsiration formed an electoral alliance named "ALLinHK" with five other Umbrella organisations, namely Kowloon East Community, Tin Shui Wai New Force, Cheung Sha Wan Community Establishment Power, Tsz Wan Shan Constructive Power and Tuen Mun Community. The alliance vowed to push forward the right to self-determination of the "Hong Kong nation". Convenor Baggio Leung, who stated to stand as Edward Leung's substitute right before the Electoral Affairs Commission invalidated Edward's nomination, and Yau Wai-ching were elected, the latter being the youngest female member of the Legislative Council.

=== Disqualification from Legislative Council ===
Youngspiration's two legislators Baggio Leung and Yau Wai-ching were under fire when they inserted their own words into the official script of the swearing-in at the first session of the Legislative Council. They pronounced China as "Chee-na", （Hong Kong Government Cantonese Romanisation uses the same "ch" letter combination to represent both aspirated chʼ and unaspirated ch, and omits the diacritics. English readers may find this spelling confusing and mispronounce the sounds.Yale romanization of Cantonese, on the other hand, uses different letters to represent these two sounds. The Yale Romanization for these two characters is "ji1 na5". To enable English readers to produce a pronunciation closest to the Cantonese, spelling it as "Jee-na" would be more appropriate.）the derogatory pronunciation used during the Second Sino-Japanese War, calling the "People's Republic of China" the "people's re-fucking of Chee-na". Their oaths were rejected by the secretary-general of the Legislative Council. Subsequently, their qualification as legislators was challenged by the government in court. The National People's Congress Standing Committee (NPCSC) intervened the court case by interpreting the Article 104 of the Basic Law of Hong Kong to "clarify" the provision of the legislators to swear allegiance to Hong Kong as part of China when they take office, stating that they would firmly oppose Hong Kong independence. As a consequence, the court vacated the two legislators' seats. Their seats in the Legislative Council were replaced by DAB's Vincent Cheng (Kowloon West) and Neo Democrats' Gary Fan (New Territories East) after the by-election which was held in March 2018.

== Performance in elections ==
=== Legislative Council elections ===
Election	Number of popular votes	% of popular votes	GC seats	FC seats	Total seats	+/−	Position
2016	63,904	2.93	2	0	2 / 70	2▲	8th▲

=== District Council elections ===
Election	Number of popular votes	% of popular votes	Total elected seats	+/−
2015	12,520	0.87	1 / 431	1▲

== See also ==
- Kowloon East Community
- Tin Shui Wai New Force
- Localism in Hong Kong
