= Tin Shui Wai New Force =

Tin Shui Wai New Force (Chinese: 天水圍民生關注平台) was a localist political group in Hong Kong established in late 2014 by a group of young people who had participated in the Umbrella Revolution. It claims to cater to the livelihood issues in Tin Shui Wai district. In the 2015 District Council elections, Wong Pak-yu, representing the group, ran in Tin Heng constituency against Beijing-loyalist Hong Kong Federation of Trade Unions (FTU) incumbent Luk Chung-hung but was defeated. In 2016, the group joined hands with other post-Umbrella organisations to run in the Legislative Council election.

On 22 August 2025, the Hong Kong government gazetted notices to strike off close to 300 groups including various defunct pro-democracy groups from the societies registry, unless they could provide proof of their existence within three months. Tin Shui Wai New Force was among the groups and is believed to be no longer operating. The group is believed to have been removed from the list of societies after the three months notification period ended in November.

== Performance in elections ==
=== Legislative Council elections ===
Election	Number of popular votes	% of popular votes	GC seats	FC seats	Total seats	+/−	Position
2016	Youngspiration ticket		0	0	0 / 70	–	–

=== District Council elections ===
Election	Number of popular votes	% of popular votes	Total elected seats	+/−
2015	1,317	0.09	0 / 431	0

== See also ==
- Youngspiration
- Kowloon East Community
- Localism in Hong Kong
- Sha Tin Community Network
