= Kowloon East Community =

Kowloon East Community 東九龍社區關注組
- Convenor: Chan Chak-to
- Founded: Late 2014
- Dissolved: 2020
- Ideology: Hong Kong localism
- Colours: Green

Website
- Official Facebook page

Kowloon East Community
- Traditional Chinese: 東九龍社區關注組
Transcriptions
Yue: Cantonese
- Yale Romanization: Dūng gáu lùhng séh kēui gwāan jyu jóu
- Jyutping: Dung^{1} gau^{2} lung^{4} se^{5} keoi^{1} gwaan^{1} zyu^{3} zou^{2}

Kowloon East Community is a localist political group formed in late 2014 in Hong Kong by a group of netizens on the online forum Hong Kong Golden Forum who were inspired by 2014 Occupy protests. It focuses on livelihood issues in Kwun Tong District and won a seat in the 2015 Hong Kong district council elections. The group was deregistered in 2020 by the police after it became defunct.

== Performance in elections ==
=== Legislative Council elections ===
Election	Number of popular votes	% of popular votes	GC seats	FC seats	Total seats	+/−	Position
2016	12,854	0.59	0	0	0 / 70	–	–

=== District Council elections ===
Election	Number of popular votes	% of popular votes	Total elected seats	+/−
2015	3,922	0.27	1 / 431	1▲

== See also ==
- Youngspiration
- Tin Shui Wai New Force
- Sha Tin Community Network
