= HKGolden =

Internet forum based in Hong Kong

Hong Kong Golden Forum
- Website type: Forum
- Owners: Alive! Media & Communications Limited
- Creator: Dr. Jim
- CEO: Joe Lam Cho-shun
- Website: forum.hkgolden.com
- Commercial: Yes
- Registration: ISP email

The HKGolden (Hong Kong Golden Forum; Chinese: 香港高登討論區) is an Internet forum for topics related to computer hardware and software among Internet users in Hong Kong in the early 2000s. HKGolden has become an Internet community. The forum is a part of HKGolden.com, a computer information portal named after the Golden Computer Centre – a shopping centre of computer products in Sham Shui Po, Kowloon, Hong Kong. Since 2006, it has become a popular general platform for Hong Kong netizens. It was the concentration platform of funny and satirical derivative works. However, due to the poor management of the administrators, many users have left since 2016.

Access to the website is blocked to users in Mainland China by the Great Firewall of China.

== History ==
In the late 1990s, due to the popularity of the Internet, competition drove stores online. In an effort to protect consumers, the traders' association of the Golden Computer Centre launched the website with information about computer hardware and software prices, thus increasing the transparency of the marketplace.

In the early 2000s, a discussion forum was launched to complement the website. It was originally open in structure and without topic demarcation, and destined for computing matters. Very soon, its topics became broader-based, the discussion area segregated into "computing" and "chill" areas, each with their own topics or "stations". On-line discussion groups formed. The community, formed by ordinary citizens as well as computer geeks, would be interested in all manner of local topics. In the course of discussions, slang would be widely employed. Neologisms would often develop, and these would quickly pass virally into colloquial usage. Users are called "Golden boys" (高登仔), and users call each other "brother" (巴打) and "sister" (絲打).

Topics are themed by hobby groups, and include 'Movies', 'Photography', 'Motoring', 'Music', 'Finance', 'Sport', 'Political', etc. Although the name "Hong Kong Golden Forum" applies to the whole, this name is now usually synonymous with the "Off-topic station" within the forum due to its runaway popularity. At one time, forum members formed themselves into registered cliques, the most prominent ones being "Big mouth" and "DIY". HKGolden has become an influential media from which topics and exclusive news are frequently being reported on magazine and newspaper. Many people believe that reporters, police and even government may be active in the forum to investigate popular culture and public opinion.

In 2003, the website was sold to Fevaworks by the owner. In July 2003, the database was severely corrupted following a hacking incident, and the website had to be closed for maintenance until 25 August of that year, when the forum was once again re-opened.

Since the incident, a number of changes were instigated:

- membership category simplified to 2 types – "ordinary" and "premium"
- ordinary members are allowed to create only 5 threads per day; no limit for premium members
- in exchange for extra privileges, premium members have to submit proofs of identity and address
- dismantling of the registered cliques
- membership is now free

On 2009, the forum leaked a six-minute detailed video involving teenage prostitution on a double-decker bus for HK$200 to raise money for designer handbag. This led to local police launching a criminal investigation.

In 2010, Westward Marukami Haruki released the online literary work Woods in Dongguan on HKGolden. Kind of Culture Publications released it as a print book. It was adapted to the film Due West: Our Sex Journey in 2012. Other early Hong Kong literature successes published on HKGolden included Siu Sing Lo's A Sweet Little Memoir (released in serialized format on HKGolden in 2010 and published by Steps Publications in hard copy the next year) and Cheung Sun's 18-Year-Old Nobi Nobita (also released in 2010 on HKGolden and published as a hard copy by Fung Lam Media in 2014).

In Hong Kong, it was reported that HKGolden was the most visited place for technology brand related discussions with 87,291 posts in a single discussion channel within three months. Twitter remained as second destination with 27,236 posts. The local Eyny Forum followed with 8,683 posts. Yahoo! HK forum was at fourth with 7,538 posts. As of 2019 March, HKGolden is the 12th top site in Hong Kong, according to Alexa.com.

== See also ==
- Hong Kong Discuss Forum
- Internet vigilantism
- Anonymous
- LIHKG Forum
