= List of Hong Kong national security cases in 2022 =

The list below shows cases concerning the National Security laws of Hong Kong in 2022, including arrests, charges, investigations and enforcement operations made or conducted under the national security laws.

The Law of the People's Republic of China on Safeguarding National Security in the Hong Kong Special Administrative Region (National Security Law, or NSL) was imposed by the National People's Congress of China and came into effect on 30 June 2020. A second national security legislation, the Safeguarding National Security Ordinance (National Security Ordinance, SNSO), was enacted by the Legislative Council of Hong Kong to implement Article 23 of Hong Kong's constitution, the Basic Law, and took effect on 23 March 2024. The police operations involving national security elements are conducted by the National Security Department of the Hong Kong Police Force (National Security Department, NSD) in spite of suspected crimes neither related to the NSL nor the national security ordinance.

As of 1 September 2026, a total of 415 individuals had been arrested on suspicion of acts and activities endangering national security since the national security law was enacted, some of whom have been sentenced to jail.

== Cases ==
=== Koo Sze-yiu (4 February 2022) ===
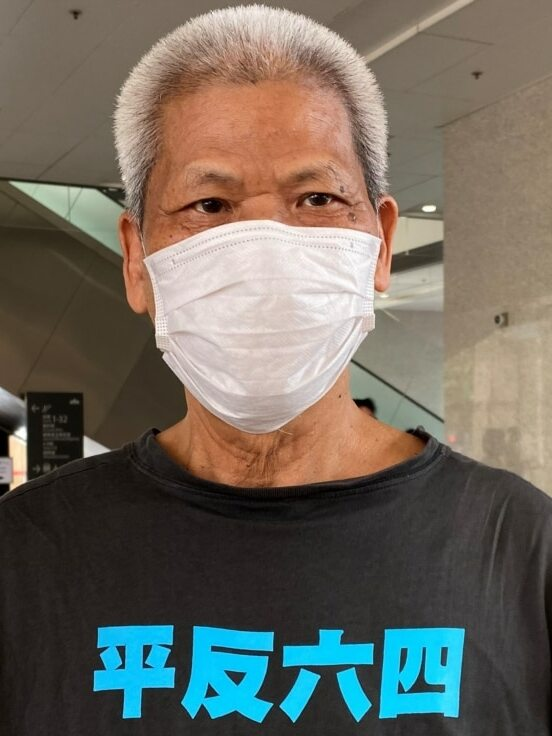
Koo in c. 2022

Koo Sze-yiu, 75-year-old veteran activist who had been jailed at least 11 times since 2000, was arrested by the NSD at his home in Sham Shui Po for inciting subversion on 4 February 2022, ahead of his planned protest against the Beijing Winter Olympics. Four more were brought to the police station to assist with the investigation: activists Lui Yuk-lin and Chan Yi-ming, former Democratic Party member Virginia Fung King-Man, and former vice-chairman of the Chinese Labour Party, Chan King-chung.

Koo was charged with attempting to commit a seditious act on the next day, with bail denied. He was found guilty of sedition charge and sentenced to nine months in prison on 12 July.

| Name | Age | Accused of | Status |
|---|---|---|---|
| Koo Sze-yiu | 75 | Inciting subversion | Found guilty jailed for 9 months for: Act with seditious intention |

=== Tommy Yuen (15 February 2022) ===
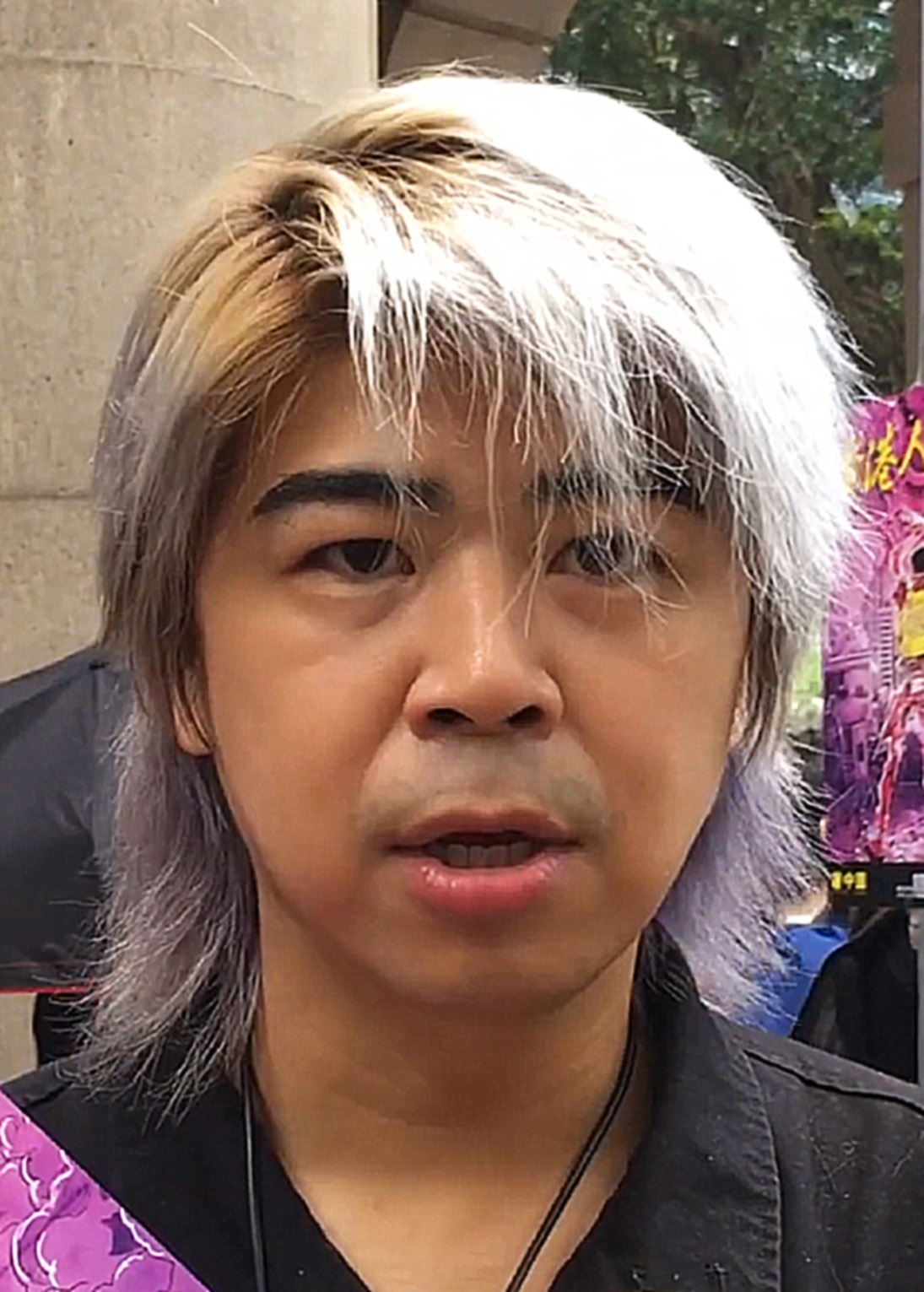
Tommy Yuen in 2019

On 15 February 2022, the NSD unit of the police arrested two men, aged 41 and 20, who were reported as singer and unemployed respectively, in Sha Tin and Tin Shui Wai. Among them, the 41-year-old man was charged with sedition and money laundering, while the 20-year-old man was arrested on suspicion of money laundering. After the police conducted a house search, they seized bank cards and records to prove the crime of money laundering. Police also froze about 140,000 Hong Kong dollars in assets. The 41-year-old man was later identified as pro-democracy singer, Tommy Yuen, and the other arrestee as his former brother-in-law, Wong Tin-ho. Yuen was accused of posting inflammatory behaviors on Facebook and Instagram, with an aim to incite hatred against the government and the judiciary, and stoking discontent among Hong Kong citizens.

On 17 February, Yuen was formally charged with one count of "doing an act or acts with seditious intention" under the colonial-era sedition law, and appeared in the West Kowloon Magistrates' Court in the afternoon. The two men were at this point not yet formally charged with money laundering. The charge alleged that between 26 September 2021 and 21 January 2022, he made statements on his Facebook and Instagram account with the seditious intent to inciting hatred or contempt against Hong Kong government. Yuen was charged on 7 June with "inciting hatred against the government" and "fraud". He was denied bail for a third time on 3 November 2022. At the court session on 2 February 2023, the prosecution applied for the fraud charge to be amended to "dealing with property known or believed to represent proceeds of an indictable offence"; Yuen did not apply for bail, and indicated through his lawyer that he intended to plead guilty to the sedition charge and to money-laundering. On 31 August, Yuen was sentenced to two years and two months in prison for sedition and money-laundering, which took into account his guilty plea.

| Name | Age | Accused of | Status |
|---|---|---|---|
| Tommy Yuen Man-on | 41 | Sedition | Pleaded guilty jailed for 2 years, 2 months for: Act with seditious intention; Fraud |
| Wong Tin-ho | 20 | Non NSL offence | Not charged |

=== Ascohesion Cheese Tea (24 February 2022) ===
Ascohesion Cheese Tea, a Mongkok bubble tea beverage shop which supported the pro-democracy movement, was targeted on 24 February 2022. One of the two owners was arrested at the shop, and the other in Tsuen Wan, by the NSD for seditious behavior after posting anti-vaccination messages online. Officers seized promotional stickers that contained slogans such as "reject digital surveillance" and "boycott LeaveHomeSafe." The shop has been posting anti-government and anti-police messages since its launch in October 2020, including a post in February 2022 which reads: "Omicron has already turned into a flu... countries around the world have already scrapped anti-epidemic mechanisms and also called on students not to take the jabs as no vaccines can prevent infection." Other posts claimed the government is insistent on launching a health code so that it can collect residents' personal information as "revenge" for the 2019 protest, and advised students to "pretend they are ill as a side effect of vaccination".

The duo was charged with "doing an act or acts with seditious intention" on the next day. Both were denied bail. After pleading guilty, Hau and Lam were jailed for 7 and 6 months.

| Name | Age | Accused of | Status |
|---|---|---|---|
| Hau Wing-yan | 21 | Sedition | Pleaded guilty jailed for 7 months |
| Lam Yuen-yi | 24 | Sedition | Pleaded guilty jailed for 6 months |

=== Martial club (20 March 2022) ===
A 59-year-old male combat coach and his 62-year-old female assistant of a martial club were arrested by NSD police on 20 March 2022 in a training unit in Tsim Sha Tsui for alleged "acts with seditious intention", and were detained for investigation. Posters allegedly "incited hate", electronic communication devices were allegedly used to distribute seditious messages, and weapons were found. Police also seized cash, mostly in foreign currency, to the amount of 380,000 Hong Kong dollars, and eight photos and posters that were said to have been in support of "anti-government protesters", including Chow Tsz-lok. The NSD said the duo were planning to "build an army", with the posts involved inciting others to use force to overturn the regime and inviting netizens to practise martial arts "in preparation for a future revolution and resisting the regime." The NSD was also discussing with the Department of Justice about adding charges under the NSL as the pair's alleged offences "far superseded seditious acts".

The pair were charged with acting with seditious intent, possessing offensive weapons with intent and possessing arms without a licence. They were denied bail pending trial.

On 22 and 23 June 2022, three men were arrested for sedition in relation to the martial arts club case; a "large number of weapons" including machetes, knives and swords was seized at their homes, as per a police announcement. The three were not brought to court for trial.

Denis Wong's sedition charge was upgraded to inciting subversion under the NSL on 5 September 2022.

The prosecutor, Vincent Lee Ting-wai, said that Wong's posts had incited others to learn how to use weapons, and said "he aimed at recruiting students with the ultimate purpose of overthrowing the government."

On 3 February 2023, Wong and Cheung pleaded guilty to inciting subversion and weapon-related charges, while Cheung was released on bail. On 24 February, Wong was sentenced to 5 years in prison, while Cheung was sentenced to 16 months in prison.

| Name / Surname | Age | Accused of | Status |
|---|---|---|---|
| Denis Wong Tak-keung | 59 | Sedition | Pleaded guilty jailed for 5 years for: Inciting subversion; Possessing offensive weapons; Possessing arms without licence |
| Iry Cheung Man-chee | 62 | Sedition | Pleaded guilty jailed for 1 years, 4 months for: Possessing offensive weapons; Possessing arms without licence |
| Chau | 39 | Sedition | Not charged |
| Tsang | 46 | Sedition | Not charged |
| Li | 51 | Sedition | Not charged |

=== Court listeners (6 April 2022) ===
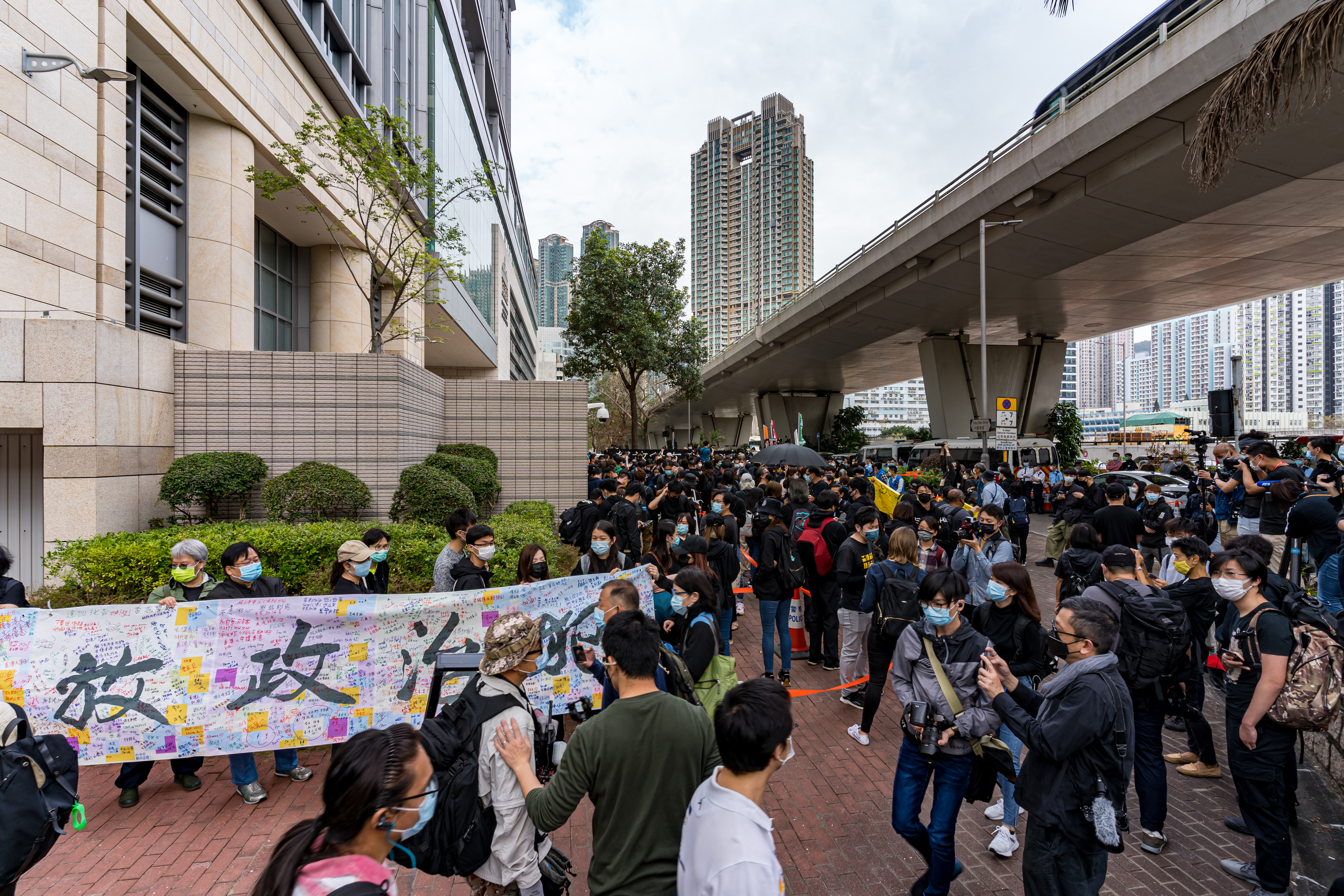
Democrats' supporters waiting outside court before pro-democracy primaries trial in 2021

On 6 April 2022, six were arrested under the sedition law on suspicion of causing nuisance during hearings seriously and affecting the solemnity of the judiciary at the High Court, West Kowloon Magistrates’ Courts and Eastern Magistrates’ Courts between December 2021 and January 2022, including a court hearing when activist Chow Hang-tung was found guilty of incitement over the 2021 commemoration of the Tiananmen massacre. Leo Tang Kin-wah, former vice-chairman of the opposition-leaning Confederation of Trade Unions, was reportedly among the arrested, as was Siu Wan (Siew Yun-long), a citizen journalist. The arrested further included pastor Garry Pang, who, as stated by the prosecution, also ran a YouTube channel on 2019 protest-related trials, and a female surnamed Chiu; the two were charged for alleged sedition and remanded in custody, while the four others were released on bail. Pang was additionally charged with performing "an act or acts of seditious intention" over his YouTube channel.

In early July 2022 Pang was denied bail at the High Court, for the third time according to local media, while Chiu was released after posting bail, vowing to report to a police station three times a week, and surrendering her travel documents. On 27 October, Pang and Chiu were sentenced to one year and three months jail respectively, with Pang having been found guilty also of the charge relating to the YouTube videos. On 31 January 2023, Chiu withdrew her bail application as stated by her lawyer at the High Court that day. She commenced her sentence the same day.

A 52-year-old male surnamed So had been arrested together with Tang and Siu. On 26 July, So was handed a suspended sentence after he had pleaded guilty to disrupting court cases; in doing so, the judge took "strong mitigating factors" into account.

Pang was sentenced to 1 year in prison for act with seditious intention and seditious words, while Chiu is jailed for 3 months for seditious words. So received a suspended sentence for contempt of court.

| Name | Age | Accused of | Status |
|---|---|---|---|
| Garry Pang Moon-yuen | 59 | Sedition | Found guilty jailed for 1 year |
| Chiu Mei-ying | 62 | Sedition | Found guilty jailed for 3 months |
| Walter So Yat-kai | 52 | Sedition | Pleaded guilty suspended sentence for: Contempt of court |
| Leo Tang Kin-wah | 32 | Sedition | Not charged |
| Siu Wan (Siew Yun-long) | 36 | Sedition | Not charged |
| Lee Wing-kam | 44 | Sedition | Not charged |

=== 612 Fund (10 May 2022) ===
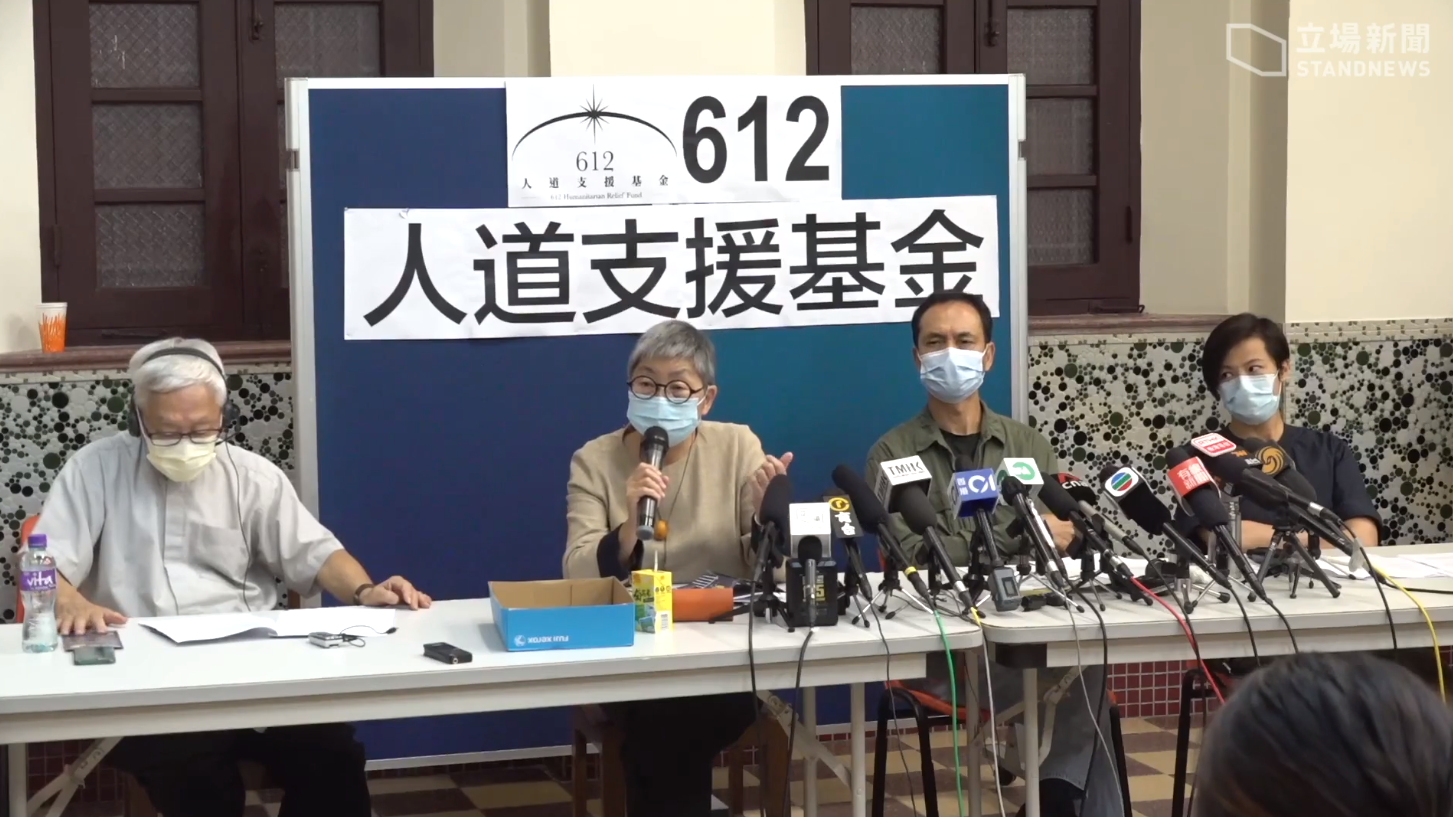
612 Humanitarian Fund confirmed on 18 August 2021 that it will end the operation

The 612 Humanitarian Relief Fund helped thousands of protesters pay for their legal and medical bills, offered financial relief, and provided loans for bail money for arrested protesters. It stopped giving out funds in September 2021 after the NSD demanded it hand over operational details including information about its donors and beneficiaries, and ceased its operations on 31 October 2021. Hui Po-keung, a cultural studies scholar who was one of the trustees of the fund, was arrested for "collusion with foreign forces" on 10 May 2022 at the airport when he was on his way to take up an academic post in Europe. Other trustees including former MP Margaret Ng, singer Denise Ho, and the retired bishop of Hong Kong Cardinal Joseph Zen, were arrested on 11 May, just hours after news of Hui arrested came. Former MP Cyd Ho, then serving a jail term, was arrested on 12 May. The Holy See expressed concern about the arrest of Cardinal Zen, who is one of the most senior Catholic clerics in Asia. Foreign countries also voiced out concern regarding the arrest. The office-bearers of the 612 Fund, including fund secretary Sze Shing-wai, were later charged with failing to register the fund as an organization with the police. All denied the charge and were not remanded awaiting trial for the court summon.

The lead prosecutor, Anthony Chau, said that the Societies Ordinance was enacted to protect national security and that requiring the Fund to register as a society did not infringe on freedom of association.

Sze was reportedly arrested at the airport on 5 November, also accused of collusion with foreign forces.

On 25 November, the five trustees were fined HK$4,000 (US$512) each, while Sze was fined HK$2,500 (US$320).

According to a police statement issued on 10 August 2023, four men and six women were arrested by national security police that day on suspicion of collusion with foreign forces, specifically with conspiring with the 612 Humanitarian Relief Fund to "accept donations from foreign organisations, and provide financial assistance to organisations that support overseas fugitives or advocate for imposing sanctions on Hong Kong", and inciting a riot. According to local sources, the arrested included activists Bobo Yip and Cheuk Kai-kai. Two further men were arrested in Tai Po on similar grounds on 29 August.

| Name | Age | Accused of | Status |
|---|---|---|---|
| Hui Po-keung | ? | Collusion | Found guilty fined for: Failing to register as an organization |
| Margaret Ng Ngoi-yee | 74 | Collusion | Found guilty fined for: Failing to register as an organization |
| Denise Ho Wan-see | 45 | Collusion | Found guilty fined for: Failing to register as an organization |
| Joseph Zen Ze-kiun | 90 | Collusion | Found guilty fined for: Failing to register as an organization |
| Cyd Ho Sau-lan | 67 | Collusion | Found guilty fined for: Failing to register as an organization |
| Sze Shing-wai | 37 | Collusion | Found guilty fined for: Failing to register as an organization |
| Bobo Yip Po-lam | | Collusion | Not charged |
| Cheuk Kai-kai | | Collusion | Not charged |
| Unknown | | Collusion | Not charged |
| Unknown | | Collusion | Not charged |
| Unknown | | Collusion | Not charged |
| Unknown | | Collusion | Not charged |
| Unknown | | Collusion | Not charged |
| Unknown | | Collusion | Not charged |
| Unknown | | Collusion | Not charged |
| Unknown | | Collusion | Not charged |
| Unknown | | Collusion | Not charged |
| Unknown | | Collusion | Not charged |

=== Tung Tau Estate explosives (23 May 2022) ===
On 23 May 2022, a 31-year-old man was arrested in a flat in Wong Tai Sin by the Cyber Security and Technology Crime Bureau of the Police Force, for allegedly inciting to cause grievous bodily harm, and making explosives. Police said on 24 May that they had become alerted through online messages by the suspect calling for attacks on police headquarters, and for intimidating messages targeting judges. A room in the flat had been converted to what police called a mini-laboratory; it seized about 20 kilograms of chemicals there. A storage room in San Po Kong was also raided by police, where about a further 10 kilograms of chemicals were found, which police said could have been used to make TATP and HMTD. His parents were also arrested by the following day. He was later brought to court and had bail denied.

On 25 June 2022, two males aged 27 and 29 were arrested by the NSD for the same bomb suspicion as the May arrests; the earlier arrests had prompted police to look into whether the celebration of the 25th anniversary of the handover on 1 July could be a target of possible attacks.

Cheung pleaded guilty to the charge of causing explosions with intent to endanger life, an alternative charge of terrorism activities under the NSL which he denied, and to three counts of making explosives. The judge condemned the "evil" plot involving explosions to target government officials and police officers. Cheung was sentenced to 14 years in prison.

| Name | Age | Accused of | Status |
|---|---|---|---|
| Cheung Lai-ming | 31 | Non NSL offence | Pleaded guilty jailed for 14 years for: Causing explosions with intent to endanger life; Making explosive |
| Unknown | 27 | Non NSL offence | Not charged |
| Unknown | 29 | Non NSL offence | Not charged |
| Unknown | 63 | Non NSL offence | Not charged (not arrested by NSD) |
| Unknown | 60 | Non NSL offence | Not charged (not arrested by NSD) |

=== Online posts (23 June 2022) ===
Two men were arrested on 23 June 2022 and charged the same day with "committing an act or acts with seditious intent". The case alleges that between 17 January 2021 and 13 June 2022, Chan Kwun-yuk shared photos and posters on Instagram intending to stir up disaffection with and disobedience to the Hong Kong and mainland governments, and to incite violence; while Chan Wai-lun was accused of publishing or continuing to display statements on the LIHKG discussion forum from 1 July 2021 to 23 June 2022, to incite violence, and to stir up disobedience to the law. NSL-designated judge Peter Law denied bail to the two on 24 June – in one case, on the grounds that the defendant may continue to engage in acts endangering national security; in the other, as the national security bail threshold could not be satisfied. This application of NSL bail conditions was in spite of the charge of sedition falling under pre-NSL legislation. The two were remanded for hearing. Both pleaded guilty to the charges, Chan Kwun-yuk was jailed for five months on 16 September while Chan Wai-lun was sentenced to 16 weeks in jail on 27 September.

| Name | Age | Accused of | Status |
|---|---|---|---|
| Chan Kwun-yuk | 28 | Sedition | Pleaded guilty jailed for 5 months |
| Chan Wai-lun | 30 | Sedition | Pleaded guilty jailed for 16 weeks |

=== Weapon seizure (26 June 2022) ===
Two men aged 31 and 53 were arrested on 26 June 2022 on suspicion of acting with seditious intention, possession of an imitation firearm and offensive weapon, and possession of an apparatus for radiocommunications without licence. Chen, the 53-year-old man, was charged with seditious intent, possession of offensive weapons, and possession of apparatus for radiocommunications without license, and brought to court on 28 June. Chen pleaded guilty to seditious intent and radio-related charges, and the prosecution withdrew a third charge, of possession of offensive weapons, as part of a plea bargain. He was sentenced to 4 months in prison on 15 September.

| Name | Age | Accused of | Status |
|---|---|---|---|
| Chen Raymond | 53 | Non NSL offence | Pleaded guilty jailed for 4 months for: Act with seditious intention; Possession of apparatus for radiocommunications without license |
| Unknown | 31 | Non NSL offence | Not charged |

=== Online posts (1 August 2022) ===
Two men, both reportedly civil servants aged 34 and 36, were arrested on 1 August 2022 by the NSD under the sedition law on suspicion of publishing social media posts that were said to have promoted "feelings of ill-will and enmity between different classes of the population of Hong Kong and incite the use of violence". Media reported that the suspects made "anti-government" posts on platforms including Facebook and discussion forum LIHKG, and shared posts that promoted Hong Kong independence. Police said the 36-year-old was also suspected of voyeurism and "publication of images originating from commission of voyeurism", after officers from the national security unit found he had taken indecent photos of an individual and shared them on social platforms. The 34-year-old was charged with seditious intent on 3 August, and remanded in custody. He was sentenced to six months in prison on 25 October.

| Name | Age | Accused of | Status |
|---|---|---|---|
| Luk Ting-fung | 34 | Sedition | Pleaded guilty jailed for 6 months |
| Unknown | 36 | Sedition | Not charged |

=== Civil Servants Secrets (9 August 2022) ===
Two government workers were arrested on 9 August 2022 on suspicion of seditious intention by publishing posts on social media group to "disseminate seditious messages that promote feelings of ill-will and enmity between different classes of the population of Hong Kong". Media reported the arrestees were the managers of the Facebook page "Civil Servants Secrets", which was closed down after the arrest. The police also probed five others and arrested two of those for fraud.

On the day of the arrest, the Civil Servants Secrets Facebook page, which acted as a platform for anonymous submissions, became inaccessible. Other "secrets" pages closed down in the following days, including those for parents, medical workers, and universities.

| Name | Age | Accused of | Status |
|---|---|---|---|
| Unknown | 28 | Sedition | Not charged |
| Unknown | 29 | Sedition | Not charged |
| Unknown | ? | Non NSL offence | Not charged |
| Unknown | ? | Non NSL offence | Not charged |

=== Queen's funeral (19 September 2022) ===
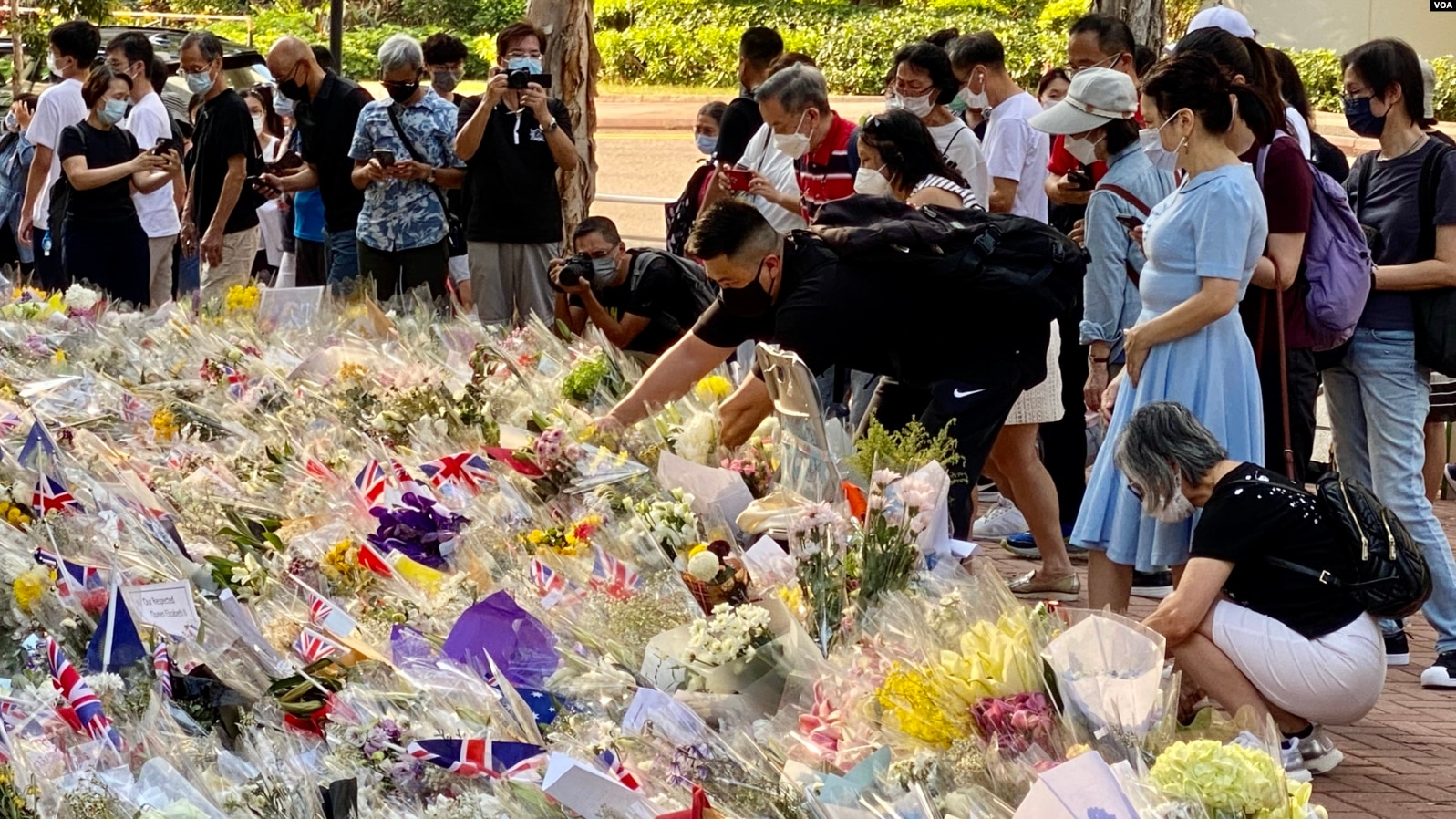
Floral tributes placed outside the British consuluate in Hong Kong

Thousands in Hong Kong paid tribute to Elizabeth II, the late Queen of the United Kingdom after her death on 8 September 2022, with queues seen outside the Consulate General of the United Kingdom every day until the funeral on 19 September. Later that night, according to police and local media, a harmonica player was arrested after playing several songs, including the British national anthem and Glory to Hong Kong, for committing "seditious acts".

| Surname | Age | Accused of | Status |
|---|---|---|---|
| Pang | 43 | Sedition | Not charged |

=== Online posts (27 September 2022) ===
Two men were arrested on 27 September 2022, suspected of publishing posts on social platforms to "disseminate seditious messages that promote feelings of ill-will and enmity between different classes of the population of Hong Kong and incite the use of violence". Media reported the men published content related to Hong Kong independence and included "one nation, one Hong Kong", "Liberate Hong Kong, revolution of our times".

On 29 September, they were each charged with one count of "doing an act or acts with seditious intention". In the case of Chui, the 18-year-old, this included pro-independence posts on LIHKG and Discord, while for Choi, it included posting pro-independence posts on LIHKG. Both were remanded in custody. The court was told that Choi called for the "execution" of "rogue" and "Nazist" judges and welcomed the United States to initiate a bombing attack on police and military premises in the city. Chui was further charged with insulting the national anthem by publishing altered lyrics and desecrating the national flag, for a total of four charges.

On 23 November, Chui pleaded guilty to all four charges, and was sentenced to a training centre on 13 December. On 16 December, Choi was sentenced to 8 months in prison. On 19 July 2023, Chui was granted bail pending appeal after posting a cash bail of 20,000 Hong Kong dollars, on conditions including a ban on leaving the city.

| Name | Age | Accused of | Status |
|---|---|---|---|
| Chui Hoi-chun | 18 | Sedition | Pleaded guilty detention |
| Choi Chun-nok | 29 | Sedition | Pleaded guilty jailed for 8 months |

=== Solidarity with Beijing Sitong Bridge protest (24 October 2022) ===
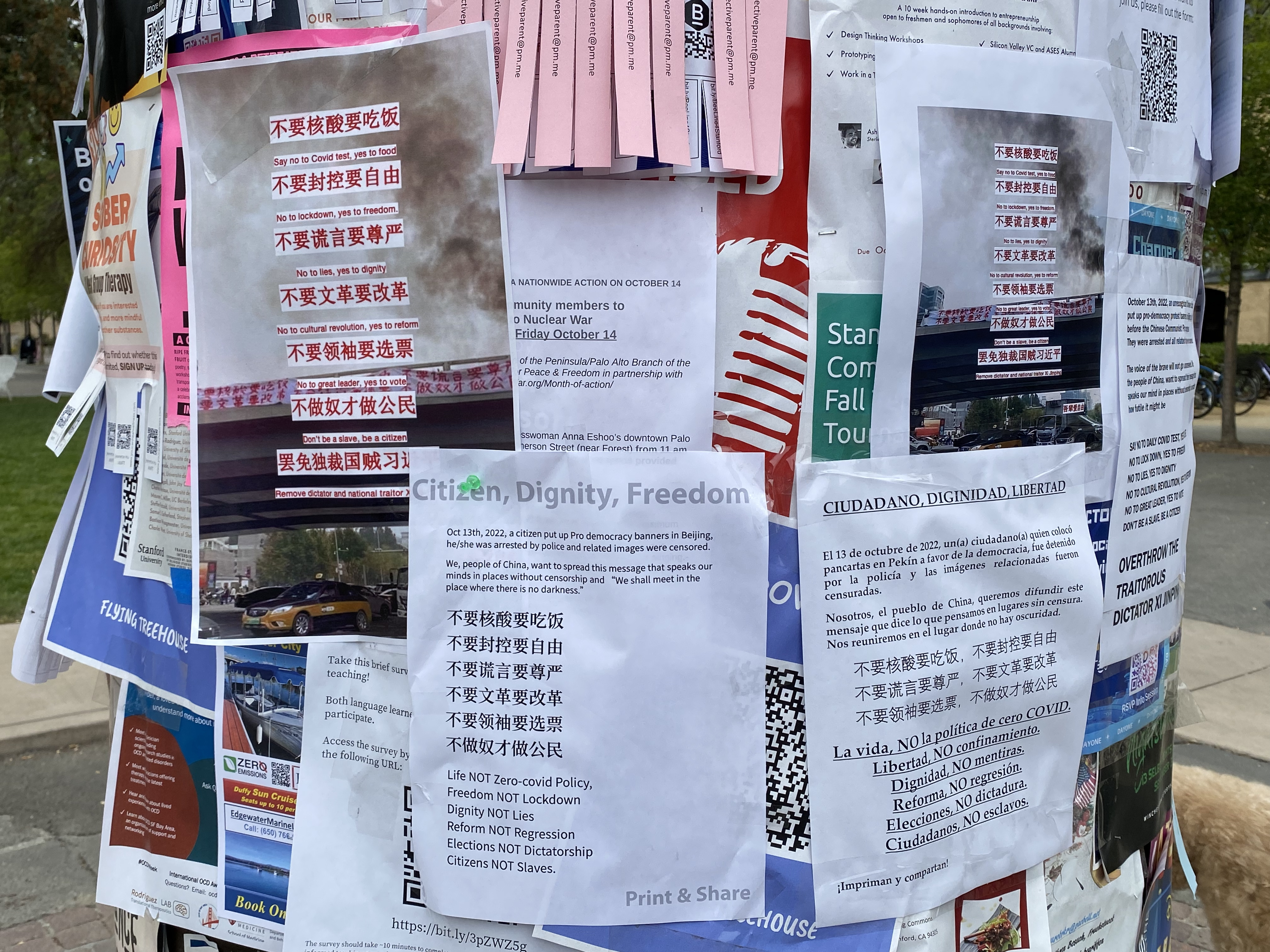
Anti-CCP posters at Stanford University, one of which showed the protest at Sitong Bridge

A male engineer from mainland China, aged 27, was arrested on 24 October 2022 in Tseung Kwan O for seditious intent, according to police. A week earlier, police had received a report from the security unit of the Legislative Council about three posters found on a noticeboard on the LegCo premises. Police stated that the posters had related to mainland policies to contain the COVID-19 pandemic and could have provoked hatred or contempt against CCP General Secretary Xi Jinping, without elaborating.

| Surname | Age | Accused of | Status |
|---|---|---|---|
| Shi | 27 | Sedition | Not charged |

=== Arson attack (24 October 2022) ===
On 24 October 2022, the NSD arrested 22-year-old Cheung Ho-yeung in Yuen Long on five charges: terrorism, arson, conspiracy to commit arson, conspiracy to defraud, and money laundering. He was accused of committing arson at a Tsuen Wan COVID-19 testing station in May 2021, planning to carry out an arson attack on a COVID-19 testing centre, and defrauding a bank. The man was reported by local media to be a member of anti-government group Black Bloc and suspected of providing financial support to the group Returning Valiant.

Six others were arrested in October 2022 connection with the offences, including a 20-year-old man and a 52-year-old woman, for conspiracy to commit arson over the attempted arson attack. The remaining two men and two women, aged between 36 and 43, were suspected of conspiring to defraud a bank while applying for a loan and successfully obtained around HK$4.7 million. A further man, aged 47, was arrested on 4 April 2023 in relation to the case, according to a police statement from that evening. Cheung was later charged on 20 April 2023 and subsequently denied bail by court; the seven named alleged co-conspirators were also charged under the NSL, in a separate case of Returning Valiant. On 12 May, on request from the prosecution, the NSL case of Cheung was moved to the High Court. On 16 November, the suspected defrauding cases of Cheung and three other defendants were transferred to the District Court. On 28 December, Cheung was sentenced to 6 years in prison with other members of Returning Valiant.

| Name | Age | Accused of | Status |
|---|---|---|---|
| Cheung Ho-yeung | 22 | Terrorist activities and non NSL offences | See Returning Valiant |
| Unknown | 20 | Non NSL offence | Not charged |
| Unknown | 52 | Non NSL offence | Not charged |
| Unknown | 36 | Non NSL offence | Not charged |
| Unknown | 43 | Non NSL offence | Not charged |
| Unknown | ? | Non NSL offence | Not charged |
| Unknown | ? | Non NSL offence | Not charged |
| Unknown | 47 | Non NSL offence | Not charged |

=== Hong Kong Independence Party (1 November 2022) ===
Joseph John (also known as Wong Kin-chung), a 40-year-old man of Portuguese nationality, was arrested by the NSD on 1 November 2022. Police alleged he was linked to an organization and had been posting seditious material on multiple occasions, launching crowdfunding campaigns to fund a military force, and urging the international community to send troops to Hong Kong on the website and four social media accounts of the Hong Kong Independence Party from 9 October to 1 November 2022, of which he was president. John was reportedly arrested after arriving in Hong Kong to tend to an ill family member. He was then charged with act with sedition intention on 3 November and had his bail application denied by court. The charge was upgraded to inciting secession in March 2023; later that month at the District Court, he was denied bail again.

After having been convicted in February 2024 of conspiring to incite others to commit secession between 1 July 2020 and 1 November 2022, he was sentenced to five years in jail on 11 April. The district court judge ruled that John had "demonised China" with his posts. His guilty plea reduced his sentence, for which a starting point had been set at 78 months, but the categorization of his offence as "serious" meant that the usual one-third jail term discount did not apply.

| Name | Age | Accused of | Status |
|---|---|---|---|
| Joseph John (Note: First dual national sentenced under the NSL) | 40 | Sedition | Pleaded guilty jailed for 5 years for: Inciting secession |

=== Online posts (3 November 2022) ===
Five were arrested by non-NSD police officers in May 2022 over messages in Telegram, accused of developing weapons and plotting to kill police officers. They were subsequently charged with conspiracy to cause grievous bodily harm and other offences. On 3 November, months after four had been remanded in custody, three of those each faced a new charge of seditious act, making this a national security case. Apart from one that was found not guilty, the four defendants pleaded guilty and were sentenced to 16 to 38 months in prison on 29 February 2024.

| Name | Age | Accused of | Status |
|---|---|---|---|
| Chan Sze-nok | 36 | Non NSL offence | Pleaded guilty jailed for 3 years, 2 months for: Act with seditious intention; Conspiracy to cause grievous bodily harm; Possession of arms with intent to endanger life |
| Lee Ho-yuen | 18 | Non NSL offence | Pleaded guilty jailed for 2 years, 5 months for: Conspiracy to act with seditious intention; Conspiracy to cause grievous bodily harm |
| Wong Yu-lo | 36 | Non NSL offence | Pleaded guilty jailed for 2 years for: Conspiracy to act with seditious intention; Conspiracy to cause grievous bodily harm; Possession of dangerous drugs; Possession of arms without licence |
| Choi Kai-min | 19 | Non NSL offence | Pleaded guilty jailed for 1 year, 4 months for: Conspiracy to cause grievous bodily harm |
| Cheung Pui-shin | 16 | Non NSL offence | Acquitted for: Conspiracy to cause grievous bodily harm |

=== Online posts (21 November 2022) ===
A 42-year-old man named Wong Chung-kit was arrested on 21 November 2022, suspected of publishing seditious messages, including thanking the South Korean government for recognising the "Hong Kong national anthem". He also allegedly shared a video of a recent South Korean Rugby Sevens game, when Glory to Hong Kong was played as Hong Kong's national anthem instead of the Chinese national anthem.

On 23 November, Wong was charged for doing an act or acts with seditious intention through social media posts on Facebook, Instagram and Twitter, between January 2021 and November 2022, and denied bail. On 5 January 2023, Wong was sentenced to eight months in prison. According to the judge, the posts had advocated for Hong Kong independence, encouraged others to use violence – in particular with reference to the 1 July police stabbing – , and encouraged others to counter anti-COVID-19 pandemic efforts by avoiding vaccination, not using the LeaveHomeSafe app, and not wearing a mask. The sentenced included a one-third deduction for his having pleaded guilty.

| Name | Age | Accused of | Status |
|---|---|---|---|
| Wong Chun-kit | 42 | Sedition | Pleaded guilty jailed for 8 months |

=== Online posts (12 December 2022) ===
A man aged 49 was arrested in Aberdeen for sedition and doxxing after allegedly publishing social media posts which "insulted" the Chinese national anthem and disclosing the personal data of police officers and their family members without consent.

| Name | Age | Accused of | Status |
|---|---|---|---|
| Unknown | 49 | Sedition and non NSL offences | Not charged |
