= List of Hong Kong national security cases in 2023 =

The list below shows cases concerning the National Security laws of Hong Kong in 2023, including arrests, charges, investigations and enforcement operations made or conducted under the national security laws.

The Law of the People's Republic of China on Safeguarding National Security in the Hong Kong Special Administrative Region (National Security Law, or NSL) was imposed by the National People's Congress of China and came into effect on 30 June 2020. A second national security legislation, the Safeguarding National Security Ordinance (National Security Ordinance, SNSO), was enacted by the Legislative Council of Hong Kong to implement Article 23 of Hong Kong's constitution, the Basic Law, and took effect on 23 March 2024. The police operations involving national security elements are conducted by the National Security Department of the Hong Kong Police Force (National Security Department, NSD) in spite of suspected crimes neither related to the NSL nor the national security ordinance.

As of 1 September 2026, a total of 415 individuals had been arrested on suspicion of acts and activities endangering national security since the national security law was enacted, some of whom have been sentenced to jail.

== Cases ==
=== Zeng Yuxuan (1 January 2023) ===
Zheng Yuxuan, a mainland Chinese postgraduate law student aged 22 at the time, was arrested in Causeway Bay on 1 January 2023 after placing candles, flowers, and pictures with allegedly "seditious" words paying, according to local media, tribute to Leung Kin-fai who stabbed a policeman in 2021. She was later released on police bail, until she was arrested again in June for sedition over the tribute. The charge was withdrawn on 12 September. She was jailed the same day for six months after having pleaded guilty to another charge under the sedition law, which arose from a large banner having been found at her living place after her arrest, reportedly having been ordered from the United States for her intended one-person protest to commemorate the 34th anniversary of the 1989 Tiananmen Square massacre. She was deported from Hong Kong to mainland China in October after having completed her sentence.

The prosecution was represented by Sr Public Prosecutor.

Name	Age	Accused of	Status
Zeng Yuxuan	23	Sedition	Pleaded guilty, 6-month jail for: Act with seditious intention

=== Online posts (5 January 2023) ===
On 5 January 2023, Wong Ho-cheong, a former council member of the now-dissolved student union at Chinese University, was arrested by national security police for alleged sedition over his social media posts, some of which called for Hong Kong independence. In March 2023 he was sentenced to five months in prison.

Name	Age	Accused of	Status
Wong Ho-cheong	24	Sedition	Pleaded guilty jail for 8 months

=== Lunar New Year fair (17 January 2023) ===
Six people were arrested by the NSD on 17 January 2023 over the production, publishing and sale of a "seditious" book on the 2019 protests. Officers from the NSD and Customs also raided a Lunar New Year fair at Ginza Plaza in Mongkok. Alan Keung, nicknamed "Pastor Keung", founder of independent news outlet Free HK Media, was among those arrested, according to local reports.

The police said the six, aged 18 to 62, were "members of an anti-government organisation", accusing them of producing and publishing a "seditious book about a series of riots that occurred in Hong Kong from June 2019 to February 2020". The police also claimed the content of the book reportedly sold at Shame On You Grocery Store "advocates for Hong Kong independence", and "incites others to overthrow the central authorities and Hong Kong’s government". Police also said that other products sold at the same stall "glorified violence or opposed the government".

Three of the six were later charged with conspiracy to do an act or acts with seditious intention, and had their bail denied by court. On 20 March, Lee, Keung and Chan were sentenced to 5 months, 8 months and 10 months in prison, respectively. Keung would later be wanted by the NSD after leaving Hong Kong.

Name	Age	Accused of	Status
Alex Lee Lung-yin	52	Sedition	Pleaded guilty jail for 5 months
Alan Keung Ka-wai	31	Sedition	Pleaded guilty jail for 8 months
Cannis Chan Sheung-yan	48	Sedition	Pleaded guilty jail for 10 months
Unknown	18	Sedition	Not charged
Unknown	62	Sedition	Not charged
Unknown	?	Sedition	Not charged

=== Online posts (8 March 2023) ===
A 23-year-old woman named Yuen Ching-ting was arrested by the NSD on 8 March 2023 in Sau Mau Ping on suspicion of inciting secession by publishing online posts. In June 2023 the court heard that of the 22 allegedly secessionist posts that Yuen had made on Facebook and Instagram between September 2018 and March 2023, only two had been made in the city. Yuen was studying in Japan and had returned to Hong Kong to renew her Hong Kong identity card. On 15 June, Yuen was formally charged with act with seditious intention. She was released on bail on 16 June. On 3 November, she was sentenced to 2 months in prison after pleading guilty.

The arrest, confirmed by a Japanese professor, has raised concern in Japan and Hong Kong as the "first national security case applying extraterritorial jurisdiction".

Name	Age	Accused of	Status
Yuen Ching-ting (Note: Considered to be the first national security case applying extraterritorial jurisdiction)	23	Inciting subversion	Pleaded guilty jail for 2 months for: Act with seditious intention

=== Elizabeth Tang (9 March 2023) ===
On 9 March 2023, Elizabeth Tang, general secretary of the International Domestic Workers Federation and former chief executive of pro-democracy Confederation of Trade Unions, was arrested by the NSD after visiting her imprisoned husband, former opposition lawmaker Lee Cheuk-yan, at Stanley Prison. The NSD said the 65-year-old was arrested for suspected collusion with a foreign country or external elements to endanger national security.

South China Morning Post reported Tang was the director of Asia Monitor Resource Centre, and suspected by another state-owned media Ta Kung Pao of receiving donations from groups in the United States, Germany and Norway since 1994 to support labour movements in Asia. The centre in 2021 dismissed Ta Kung Pao's report as a "false accusation" and stressed the centre was "independent of any local or international organisations”. Reports said Tang had left for Britain in 2021 when the centre announced dissolution over "intensified" pressure.

On 11 March, the NSD arrested Marilyn Tang, the younger sister of Elizabeth Tang, and Frederick Ho, younger brother of opposition veteran Albert Ho on suspicion of conspiracy to pervert the course of justice, after Elizabeth Tang was released on police bail. Media reports said the duo were detained for questioning after officers suspected they had taken evidence related to allegations that Elizabeth Tang violated the NSL. They were released on bail. On 21 December, after having pleaded guilty to perverting the course of public justice, Tang was sentenced to six months in prison.

Name	Age	Accused of	Status
Marilyn Tang Yin-lee	63	Non NSL offences	Pleaded guilty jail for 2 months for: Perverting the course of public justice
Elizabeth Tang Yin-ngor	65	Collusion	Not charged
Frederick Ho Chun-ki	65	Non NSL offences	Not charged

=== Import of publication (14 March 2023) ===
Two males aged 38 and 50 were arrested on 13 March 2023 under the sedition law, according to police and local media reports. Police said the publications were capable of "incited hatred or contempt" against the Chinese and Hong Kong governments and the judiciary and "were also capable of inciting others to use violence or disobey the law". The 38-year-old Kurt Leung was then charged with one count of "import of seditious publications". According to a summary of facts read out at the sentencing of Leung, he had signed for the delivery of children's books about sheep and wolves that had led to sedition convictions in a high-profile trial in 2022. In addition, the parcel had also included three books based on the same narrative. In 2021, at the arrests that led to the 2022 trial, police had warned parents to destroy copies of the books, while a senior national security police official had said it "should not pose a problem" to merely possess those publications; police said later that the possession of seditious publications was "a serious crime". Leung was sentenced in October 2023 to four months in prison, with the judge taking into account his guilty plea and his conclusion that Leung had not requested the import of the books.

Name	Age	Accused of	Status
Kurt Leung	38	Sedition	Pleaded guilty jail for 4 months
Unknown	50	Sedition	Not charged

=== Online posts (28 March 2023) ===
The NSD arrested a 48-year-old woman over "acts with seditious intention" on 28 March 2023, related to "seditious" content on different social media platforms that "incited hatred towards the Hong Kong and central governments, included slogans, promoted Hong Kong independence, incited violent protest, and insulted China’s national flag and anthem". Local media reported that the content on Twitter included "Liberate Hong Kong, revolution of our times", pro-independence chants, and an image of the Black Bauhinia flag. She was remanded in custody after being denied bail. On 27 April, she was sentenced for four months after pleading guilty.

Name	Age	Accused of	Status
Law Oi-wa	48	Sedition	Pleaded guilty jail for 4 months

=== Ninety-two Chims (6 June 2023) ===
Six people have been arrested by the NSD on 6 June 2023 for allegedly conspiring to forge signatures, reportedly of a protester, on documents, two of whom were also suspected of repeatedly publishing posts on social media with a "seditious intention" to bring "hatred against the government, advocated Hong Kong independence and incited the use of violence". Chinese state media Wen Wei Po and Sing Tao Daily said the group of six includes two "prison visitors", who often paid visit to jailed protesters, two relatives and two members of Ninety-two Chim, a group behind bomb plots. Two women, aged 33 and 44, were not charged and released. The police again arrested two on 15 June for preventing the course of justice, including one woman who had been released on bail after being detained on 6 June for forgery and sedition. The police said she "allegedly attempted to pervert the course of justice by attempting to influence other defendants of the 'conspiracy to forgery' case through the 30-year-old man" after released on bail, and was charged with perverting the course of public justice and conspiracy to forgery. In the forgery case, three men have also been charged.

A total of 8 individuals were charged with anti-terrorism offences, the law cited by an earlier case against the Dragon Slaying Brigade.

Name	Age	Accused of	Status
Unknown	64, female	Sedition and non NSL offences	Charged: Perverting the course of public justice; Conspiracy to forgery
Unknown	33	Sedition and non NSL offences	Charged?: Conspiracy to forgery
Unknown	?	Non NSL offences	Charged?: Conspiracy to forgery
Unknown	?	Non NSL offences	Charged?: Conspiracy to forgery
Unknown	33, female	Non NSL offences	Not charged
Unknown	44, female	Non NSL offences	Not charged
Unknown	30	Non NSL offences	Not charged?

=== Online posts (26 June 2023) ===
A 63-year-old man, whose name was given by local media as Danny Kong, was arrested by the NSD on 26 June 2023 in Tsim Sha Tsui on suspicion of repeatedly publishing content online, alleged by police to be "seditious messages", that incited the overthrowing of the Central government as well as hatred towards the Central and Hong Kong authorities, among other allegations related to the posts. Police seized electronic devices that it believed to have been used to make the posts. On 27 July, he was sentenced to three months in prison.

Name	Age	Accused of	Status
Danny Kong Tat-kuen	63	Sedition	Pleaded guilty jail for 3 months

=== Mee App (5 July 2023) ===
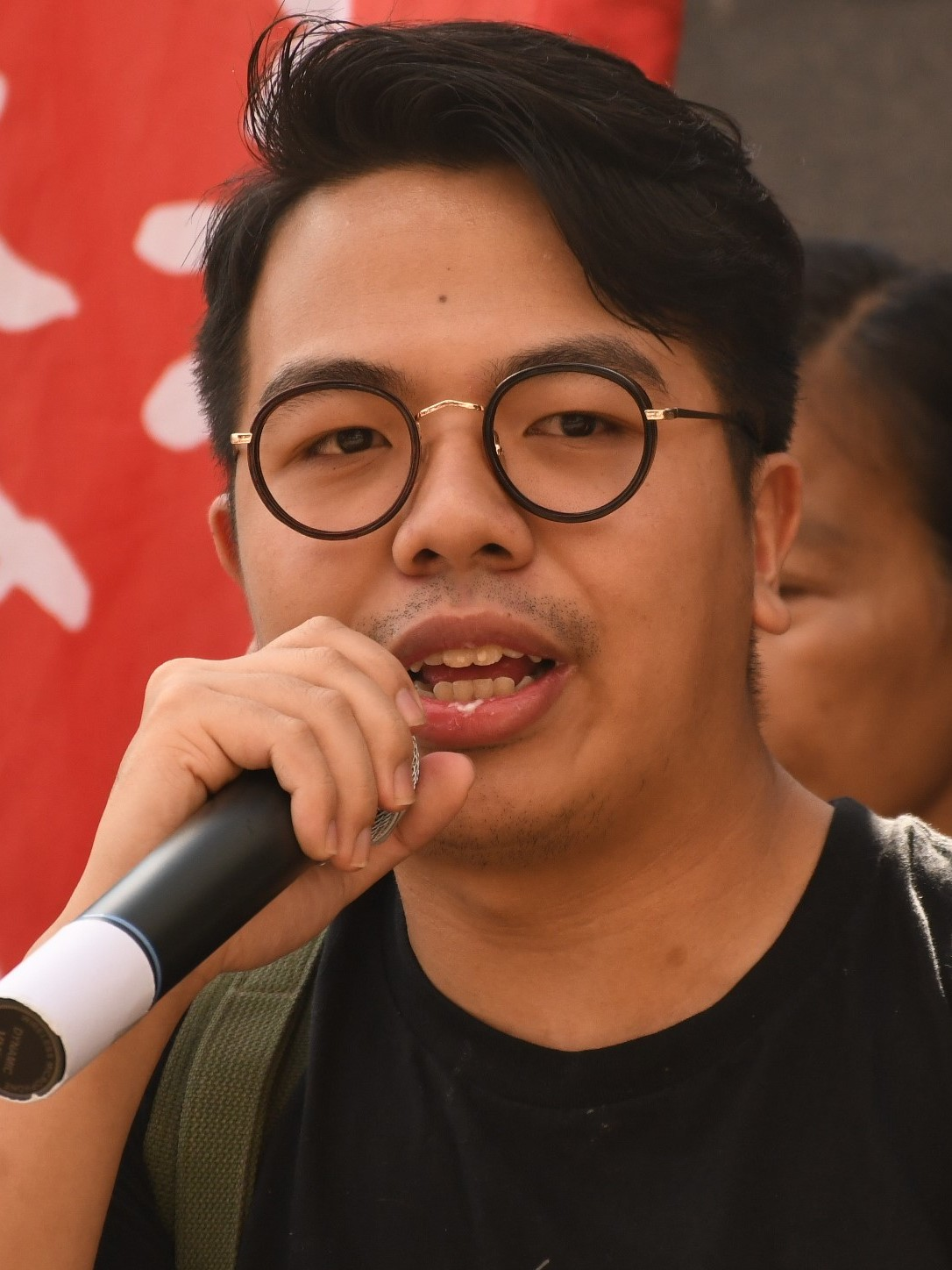
Ivan Lam

Four men aged 26 to 28 were arrested in a police raid in Kwai Chung on 5 July 2023 for, as per a police statement, alleged "conspiracy to collude with a foreign country or with external elements to endanger national security" and "conspiracy to doing acts with seditious intent", as well as for publishing "seditious" material online to provoke hatred against the Hong Kong and central government authorities and promote Hong Kong independence. Police believed the group had received funding from operating companies, social media platforms and mobile applications to support self-exiled activists who themselves, according to police, continued to endanger national security through their activities.

A fifth person was arrested on similar charges on the morning of 6 July at Hong Kong International Airport. The first four arrested were released on bail on 7 July according to police, who also said that they had to report back to police in early August.

Local media reported that the five were members of the defunct activist group Demosisto, and are connected with the mobile app "Mee". Created in 2020, Mee, whose full name translates as Punish Mee as a tongue-in-cheek reference to its purpose, mapped out the locations of "yellow businesses", including pro-democracy restaurants, shops and service providers, and provided discounts and information about the stores. The app vanished from online platforms and app stores after the arrests. Citing unnamed sources, media said the app was allegedly used to raise funds and provide financial aid to eight wanted activists overseas for whose capture authorities had offered bounties days earlier.

On 13 July, national security police raided the home of a further former Demosisto member but he was not arrested. Two additional persons, former Demosisto executives Lily Wong Lei-lei and Chan Kok-hin, were arrested on 27 July, bringing the total number to seven. The two were suspected of having connections with four of the people arrested on 5 July. They were released on bail on 29 July.

Name	Age	Accused of	Status
Ivan Lam Long-yin	28	Collusion, Sedition	Not charged
William Liu Wai-lim	30	Collusion, Sedition	Not charged
Li Kai-ching	?	Collusion, Sedition	Not charged
Arnold Chung Chin-ku	?	Collusion, Sedition	Not charged
Calvin Chu Yan-ho	24	Collusion, Sedition	Not charged
Lily Wong Lei-lei	29	Collusion, Sedition	Not charged
Chan Kok-hin	29	Collusion, Sedition	Not charged

=== Online posts (18 September 2023) ===
A 46-year-old male clerk surnamed Chow was arrested on 18 September 2023 in Hung Hom by national security police, according to a police statement, which said that he was charged the next day with one count of "doing an act or acts with seditious intention". He was arrested for posting messages online that called for sanctions against Hong Kong government officials and inciting the use of violence, a separate police statement said. He was jailed on 23 November for four months after having pleaded guilty.

Name	Age	Accused of	Status
Chow Man-wai	46	Sedition	Pleaded guilty jail for 4 months

=== Online posts (17 October 2023) ===
A 57-year-old male was arrested on 17 October 2023 in Tuen Mun by national security police, according to a police statement, and charged the next day with one count of "doing an act or acts with seditious intention", and later one count of "Possessing seditious publication". According to another police statement, he had posted content between April and October 2023 provoking hatred towards the Beijing and Hong Kong governments, having advocated "independence of Hong Kong", demanded sanctions against government officials, and incited the use of violence. He was denied bail. On 14 December, he was sentenced to 5 months in jail after pleading guilty.

Name	Age	Accused of	Status
Au Kin-wai	57	Sedition	Pleaded guilty jail for 5 months

=== Shirt with "seditious wording" (27 November 2023) ===
A 26-year-old male surnamed Chu was arrested on 27 November 2023 at Hong Kong International Airport near a boarding gate over allegedly wearing a shirt which was reported to police as having "seditious wording". According to local reports, at a court session on 4 January 2024, it was said that an airport security guard had spotted Chu's shirt bearing the slogan "Liberate Hong Kong, revolution of our times". Police also found three flags bearing the slogan on him, as well as an identity card of another person. Chu was charged on 29 November with "doing an act or acts with seditious intention", "possessing seditious publications", and carrying the mentioned identity card. He was denied bail. At the 4 January 2024 court session, Chu pleaded guilty to the two sedition charges while the identity card charged was dropped. Chu was sentenced on 10 January to three months in jail.

Name	Age	Accused of	Status
Chu Kai-pong	26	Sedition	Pleaded guilty jail for 3 months

=== Koo Sze-yiu (8 December 2023) ===
Koo Sze-yiu was arrested on 8 December 2023 before leaving home for a protest against the District Council elections, whose rules had undergone major changes since the previous edition. Koo was suspected of attempting or preparing an act with seditious intention. He was sentenced on 16 January 2024 to nine months jail, as had been the case in 2022 with the same charge.

Name	Age	Accused of	Status
Koo Sze-yiu	77	Sedition	Found guilty jail for 9 months

=== Activists' subscribers (14 December 2023) ===
As bounties were placed on five overseas activists on 14 December, four arrests were also announced for "providing financial assistance for secession" as the national security police accused them, aged 29 to 68, of funding Nathan Law and Ted Hui through their online subscription channels, with the fees ranging between HK$10,000 and HK$120,000. Police further revealed channels of the duo had a total of 179 subscribers.

Name	Age	Accused of	Status
Unknown	29	Financing secession	Not charged
Unknown	68	Financing secession	Not charged
Unknown	?	Financing secession	Not charged
Unknown	?	Financing secession	Not charged
