= List of Hong Kong national security cases =

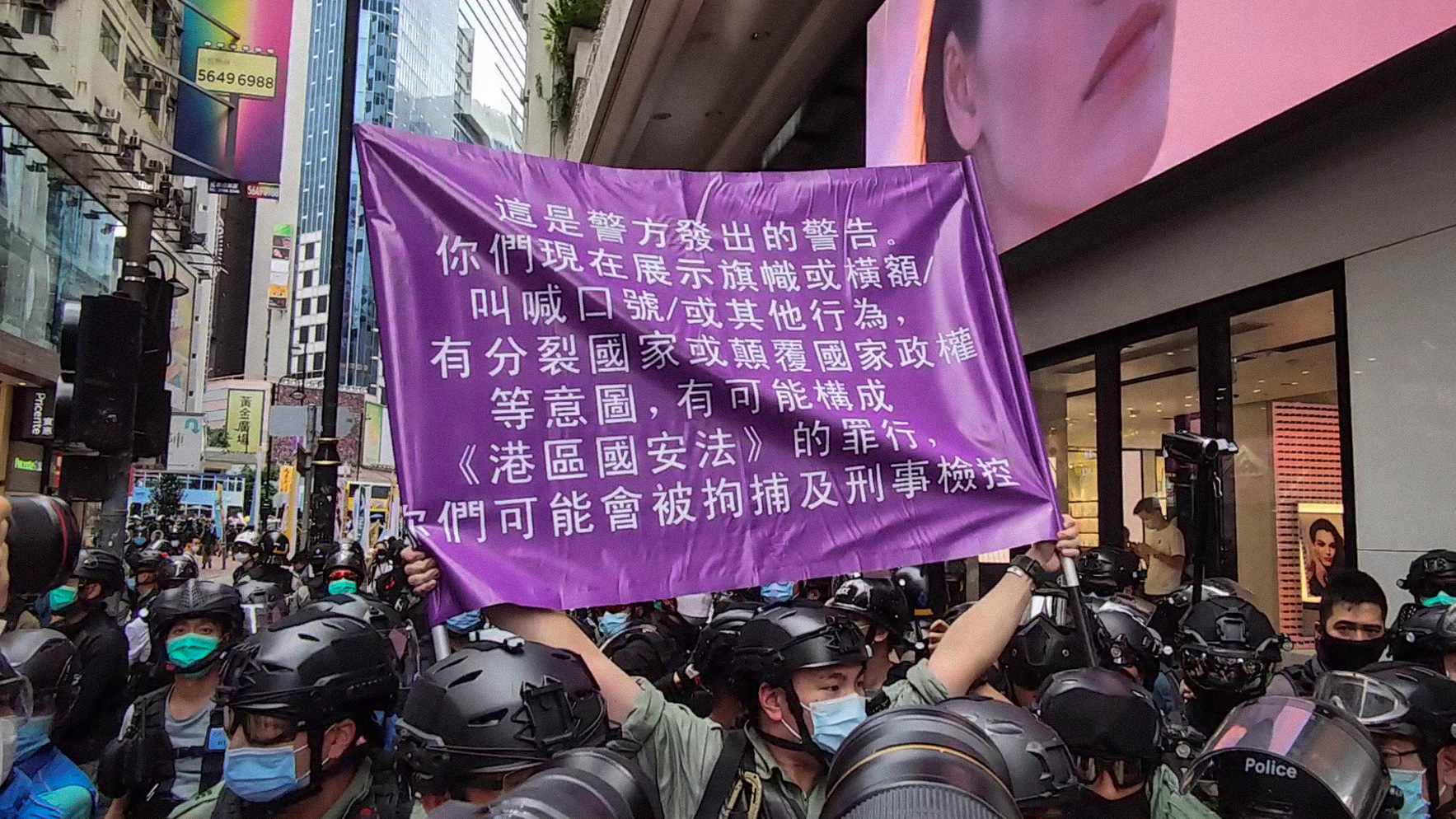
Police using a flag in purple to warn protesters of breaching the NSL

The list below shows cases concerning the National Security of Hong Kong, including arrests, charges, investigations and enforcement operations made or conducted under the national security laws.

The Law of the People's Republic of China on Safeguarding National Security in the Hong Kong Special Administrative Region (National Security Law, or NSL) was imposed by the National People's Congress of China and came into effect on 30 June 2020. A second national security legislation, the Safeguarding National Security Ordinance (National Security Ordinance, SNSO), was enacted by the Legislative Council of Hong Kong to implement Article 23 of Hong Kong's constitution, the Basic Law, and took effect on 23 March 2024. The police operations involving national security elements are conducted by the National Security Department of the Hong Kong Police Force (National Security Department, NSD) in spite of suspected crimes neither related to the NSL nor the national security ordinance.

As of 1 September 2026, a total of 415 individuals had been arrested on suspicion of acts and activities endangering national security since the national security law was enacted, some of whom have been sentenced to jail.

== Background ==
=== National Security offences ===
Offences listed in the NSL and the SNSO which are therefore considered "offence endangering national security" include:

	Category	Offences	Maximum sentence
NSL	Secession	Plans or participates secession	Life imprisonment
NSL	Secession	Incites or assists in secession	10 years
NSL	Subversion	Plans or participates in subversion	Life imprisonment
NSL	Subversion	Incites or assists in subversion	10 years
NSL	Terrorist Activities	Plans or participates terrorist activities	Life imprisonment
NSL	Terrorist Activities	Organises or takes charge of terrorist organisation	Life imprisonment
NSL	Terrorist Activities	Provides support or prepare for terrorist activity	10 years
NSL	Terrorist Activities	Advocates terrorism or incites terrorist activity	10 years
NSL	Collusion	Steals or unlawfully provides State secrets for foreigner	Life imprisonment
NSL	Collusion	Requests foreigners or receives support from foreigner to endanger national security	Life imprisonment
SNSO (Note: The Crimes Ordinance, first enacted in November 1971 during British colonial rule, involves crimes of "treason" and "other offences against the Crown", which were not used after 1967 riots but until the NSL came into effect, of which "sedition" was most commonly involved. Despite not listed under the NSL, the Hong Kong Court of Final Appeal ruled in December 2021 that the aforementioned crimes under the Crimes Ordinance are offences endangering National Security, and that the stringent bail threshold may be applied to these crimes. According to the Interpretation and General Clauses Ordinance, "any reference in any provision to Her Majesty, the Crown, the British Government or the Secretary of State (or to similar names, terms or expressions) [...] shall be construed as a reference to the Government of the Hong Kong Special Administrative Region." These provisions were later rewritten with increase of maximum penalty and criminal scope and became part of the Safeguarding National Security Ordinance.)	Treason	Treason	Life imprisonment
SNSO	Treason	Publicly manifests intention to commit offence of treason	14 years
SNSO	Treason	Fails to disclose of commission of treason by others	14 years
SNSO	Treason	Provides unlawful drilling	10 years
SNSO	Insurrection	Insurrection	Life imprisonment
SNSO	Mutiny	Incites members of Chinese armed force to mutiny	Life imprisonment
SNSO	Mutiny	Assists members of Chinese armed force to abandon duties or absent without leave	10 years
SNSO	Disaffection	Incites disaffection of public officers or personnel of Chinese offices	10 years
SNSO	Disaffection	Possesses documents of incitement nature	3 years
SNSO	Sedition	Act with seditious intention	10 years
SNSO	State Secrets	Unlawful acquires of state secrets	7 years
SNSO	State Secrets	Unlawful possesses of state secrets	5 years
SNSO	State Secrets	Unlawful discloses of state secrets	10 years
SNSO	Espionage	Espionage	20 years
SNSO	Espionage	Enters prohibited places	2 years
SNSO	Espionage	Obstructs in vicinity of prohibited places	2 years
SNSO	Espionage	Participates in or supports external intelligence organizations, or accepts advantages offered	14 years
SNSO	Sabotage	Damages or weakens a public infrastructure	Life imprisonment
SNSO	Sabotage	Endangers national security related to electronic systems	20 years
SNSO	External interference	External interference	14 years
SNSO	Prohibited organizations	Participates in activities of prohibited organizations	14 years
SNSO	Prohibited organizations	Allows meetings of prohibited organizations to be held on premises	7 years
SNSO	Prohibited organizations	Incites to become members of prohibited organizations	7 years
SNSO	Prohibited organizations	Procures aid for prohibited organizations	7 years
SNSO	Absconder-related	Makes available or deals with funds to absconder	7 years
SNSO	Absconder-related	Leases immoveable property to or from absconder	7 years
SNSO	Absconder-related	Establish or invest in partnership with absconder	7 years
SNSO	Investigation-related	Prejudices investigation of national security offences	7 years
SNSO	Investigation-related	Unlawful discloses personal data of persons handling national security cases	10 years
SNSO	Investigation-related	Unlawful harasses persons handling national security cases	10 years

In addition to the crimes listed above, the Article 47 of the NSL and section 115 of the SNSO permits the Hong Kong Chief Executive to "issue a certificate to certify whether an act or matter involves national security", and the Article 43 of the NSL empowers the Chief Executive to enact additional rules for applying measures when the Hong Kong Police Force is handling cases concerning offence endangering national security.

Under the Implementation Rules for Article 43, multiple offences are listed, including contravening order to freeze property, or disclose offence-related properties, or remove electronic message on the electronic platform, or furnish information, or produce material, etc. The only case charged under the Implementation Rules for Article 43 is against the Hong Kong Alliance for failing to provide information under section 3(3)(b) of Schedule 5 of the Implementation Rules.

=== Judicial procedures and controversies ===
According to criminal procedure in Hong Kong, Hong Kong Police must decide whether to charge, to grant bail, or to unconditionally release the arrested individual. Defendants facing charges would be taken to court where they can submit bail application to judges. Nevertheless, under the Article 42 of the NSL, "[no] bail shall be granted to a criminal suspect or defendant unless the judge has sufficient grounds for believing that the criminal suspect or defendant will not continue to commit acts endangering national security". Hence majority of defendants were denied bail under the unprecedented strict threshold, while the minority with bail granted were required to follow a long list of requirements.

Under the Article 44, "[t]he Chief Executive shall designate a number of judges [...] to handle cases concerning offence endangering national security." The complete list of designated judges is not made available to the public as the government believes such revelation poses security threats to the designated judges. However, from open court sessions, a list of designated national security law judges has been produced.

Under the Article 46, "the Secretary for Justice may issue a certificate directing that the case shall be tried without a jury", instead "be tried in the Court of First Instance without a jury by a panel of three judges." Four cases were or are tried without a jury in High Court as of January 2023: trial of Tong Ying-kit, Hong Kong 47, Apple Daily, Hong Kong Alliance.

== Lists of cases and warrants ==
- List of Hong Kong national security warrants
- List of Hong Kong national security cases in 2020
- List of Hong Kong national security cases in 2021
- List of Hong Kong national security cases in 2022
- List of Hong Kong national security cases in 2023
- List of Hong Kong national security cases in 2024
- List of Hong Kong national security cases in 2025
- List of Hong Kong national security cases in 2026

== Other notable cases ==
=== Paul Harris (1 March 2022) ===
Paul Harris, ex-chairman of the Hong Kong Bar Association, whose pro-democracy stance had attracted criticism from Chinese and Hong Kong authorities as well as attacks by state-backed media during his year-long term, met the national security police on 1 March 2022 to assist with an investigation, and was asked to explain acts that had allegedly violated the NSL. According to HK01, the meeting was related to NGO Hong Kong Human Rights Monitor, of which Harris is the founding chairperson. Harris was not arrested and left Hong Kong for his home country of the United Kingdom just hours after the meeting. In June 2024, Harris stated that in the 2022 interview, police had called passages from his book which referred to the 2019 protests "seditious" and were saying that they were considering charging him for sedition, but that he was free to leave Hong Kong "at this moment".

=== Hong Kong Watch (14 March 2022) ===
Logo of Hong Kong Watch

Hong Kong Watch, a UK-based human rights organisation, was accused by the NSD of colluding with foreign forces, and threatened Benedict Rogers, founder of the NGO, could face imprisonment. The NSD said in the letter that acts, including "lobbying foreign countries to impose sanctions" and "seriously disrupting the formulation and implementation of laws" by the Hong Kong and Chinese Government, constitute collusion offence. Since mid-February Hong Kong Watch's website has not been accessible in Hong Kong without using a VPN. This was the first time a foreign advocacy group was confirming being formally accused of breaching the NSL. Foreign Secretary of the UK Liz Truss said in a statement the "unjustifiable action" was "clearly an attempt to silence those who stand up for human rights in Hong Kong".

=== HKCTU (31 March 2022) ===
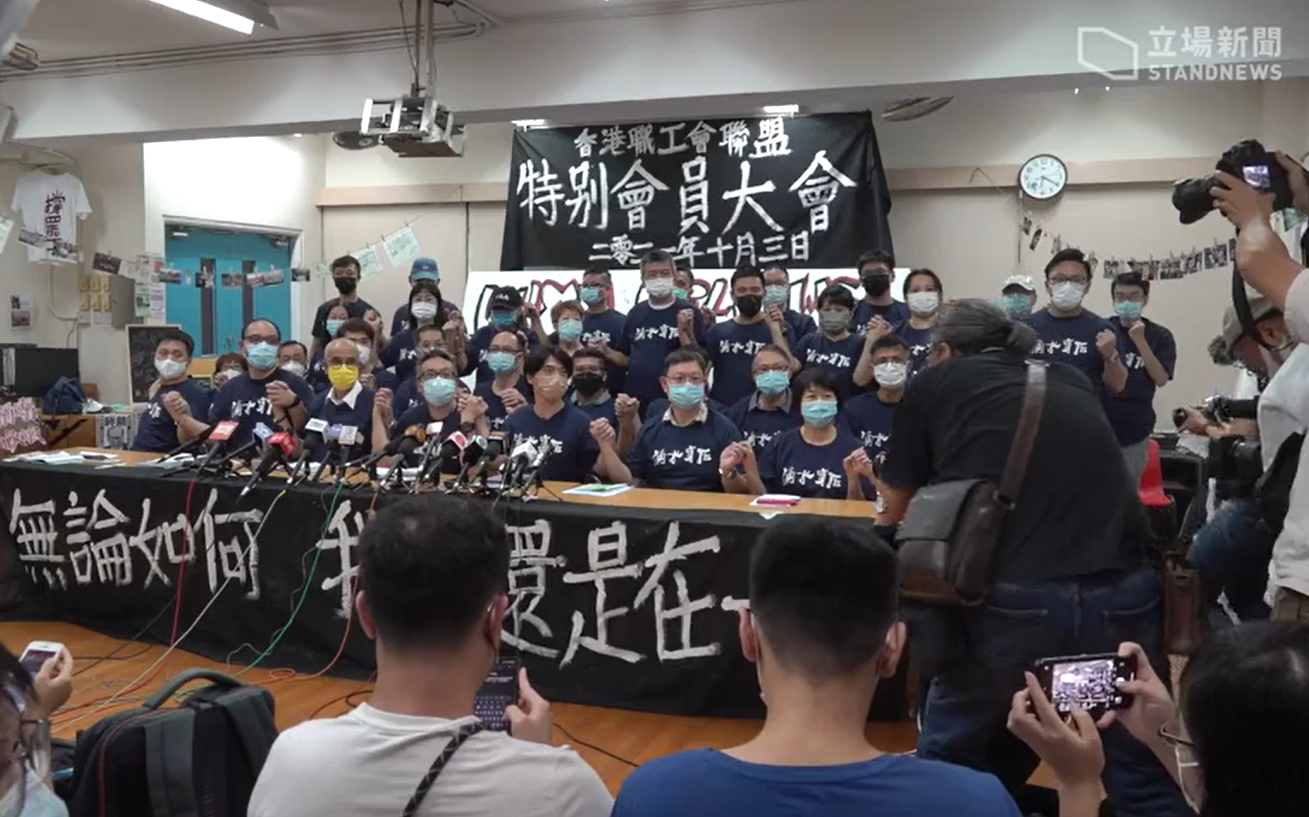
HKCTU members voted to disband the union on 3 October 2021.

The Hong Kong Confederation of Trade Unions (HKCTU), a pro-democracy union coalition disbanded in October 2021, was raided and four former leaders were brought in for questioning by the NSD, including Lee Cheuk-yan, former MP imprisoned for illegal assembly. Media reports said the union had allegedly refused to comply with a police request for information based on the Societies Ordinance. They said the force had applied for warrants to search premises related to the organisation. Three were later charged under the Societies Ordinance and got a fine of HKD$8,000.

On 22 March, four former members of HKCTU, including ex-chairman Joe Wong, ex-vice-chairman Leo Tang, and former committee members Denny To and Shek Pui-yin, were taken by the NSD to assist an investigation. The police reportedly confiscated their phones and computers, while the four were released hours later. Tang only revealed the probe was related to the national security law.

Joe Wong and Denny To later filed an application to the police on 11 April to host a Labour Day rally, but was scrapped two week later after Wong was said to have taken away for four hours. To claimed Wong was not arrested but had experienced an "emotional meltdown" and was under tremendous pressure, and cited the national security law for not being able to reveal more information. Security Secretary Chris Tang did not clarify whether the NSD had spoken to Wong, but saying cancellation is responsible if the organisers were incapable of ensuring the safety of the public event.

=== Handover anniversary (1 July 2022) ===
Amid the anniversary of the Hong Kong handover and the planned visit by Xi Jinping on this occasion, the NSD arrested nine people in the week before 1 July. The political sensitivity was unprecedentedly high before the day. The NSD met several pro-democracy groups, including the League of Social Democrats (LSD) on 28 June, which then announced not to hold any protest on 1 July, the first time in 25 years since Hong Kong was placed under Chinese rule. Nevertheless, the NSD still searched the homes of Raphael Wong, chairman of LSD, and six other LSD members were watched and followed by the NSD. Secretary-general Avery Ng wrote on 29 June that he was "imprisoned", without giving further details but stating later that he was not under house arrest. The Hong Kong Public Opinion Research Institute delayed their announcement of polling result on the level of support rate of the government, which they said was "in response to suggestions from relevant government department(s) after their risk assessment". Local newspaper Ming Pao reported that the department in question was the NSD.

=== Banning of mobile game (10 June 2025) ===
On 10 June 2025, the National Security Police declared the Taiwan-based mobile game Reversed Front: Bonfire involved in seditious elements, thus under the power authorised by Schedule 4 of the Implementation Rules for NSL Article 43, imposed disabling action against the mobile game and the developer. And any providing financial or material support to the developer would be regarded as intent to fund acts of secession or subversion of state power.

== Calls for sanctions ==
=== Prosecutors ===
The US Congressional-Executive Commission on China (CECC) has, in July 2022 and March 2023, called on the US government to sanction prosecutors and team members who represent the Hong Kong government in national security cases, including:

1. Alice Chan Shook-man
2. Crystal Chan Wing-sum
3. Anthony Chau Tin-hang
4. Ivan Cheung Cheuk-kan
5. Cherry Chong Man-yan
6. Derek Lai Kim-wah
7. Wilson Lam Yi Yeung
8. Edward Lau Wan-cheung
9. Vincent Lee Ting-wai
10. Andy Lo Tin-wai
11. Karen Ng Ka-yuet
12. Laura Ng Shuk-kuen
13. William Siu Kai-yip
14. Jennifer Tsui Sin-chi
15. Maggie Yang Mei-kei

The list is not exhaustive, as other prosecutors were involved with cases.

=== Judges ===
In May 2023, the CECC called on the US government to sanction 29 Hong Kong national security judges known to be involved in cases. The report met with prompt and strong condemnation from Hong Kong authorities, which accused it of making "slandering remarks and despicable threats" against the city's judges. The Hong Kong Bar Association expressed "grave concerns" about the calls for sanctions against the judges, which it deemed to be effectively an attempt to interfere with judicial independence. On 3 November 2023, two days after a bipartisan group of US lawmakers had introduced a bill to have such sanctions implemented, the Hong Kong government slammed the move as "despicable" intimidation. The move was also condemned by all LegCo parliamentarians. In November 2023, pro-Beijing scholar Lau Siu-kai said that "significant national security cases" may be transferred to mainland China – provided for in Article 55 of the National Security Law – should the proposed sanctions materialise; later the same month, Secretary for Justice Paul Lam said that such a transfer would be "exceptional" and ultimately a decision made by the central government.

In its annual report submitted to the U.S. Congress by the United States–China Economic and Security Review Commission on 14 November 2023, a recommendation was made to sanction judges of the city's Court of Final Appeal, including foreign citizens. The Hong Kong government "firmly rejected" the report.

=== Hong Kong Sanctions Act ===
In November 2023, a bipartisan group of US lawmakers introduced the Hong Kong Sanctions Act, naming 49 judges, prosecutors, and government officials who the lawmakers deemed "accountable for human rights violations" and should be sanctioned by the US government. Figures who were newly called for being sanctioned, compared to the previous two CECC reports, included Paul Lam Ting-kwok, Sonny Au Chi-kwong, Raymond Siu Chak-yee, judge Amy Chan Wai-Mun, prosecutor Jonathan Man Tak-ho, and private lawyer Memi Ng.

== See also ==
- Hong Kong Basic Law Article 23
- HKSAR v Lai Chee Ying
- Macau national security law
- National People's Congress decision on Hong Kong national security legislation
- National Security Law of the People's Republic of China
- National Security (Legislative Provisions) Bill 2003
