= Leticia Wong =

Hong Kong activist (born 1992)

- 黃文萱
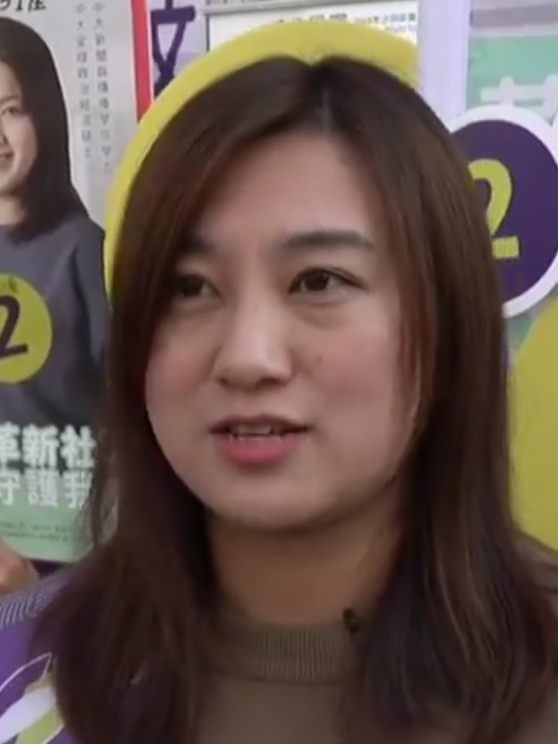
- Wong campaigning for the 2019 Hong Kong local elections
- Born: 18 October 1992 (age 33); City One, Sha Tin, Hong Kong
- Education: Chinese University of Hong Kong
- Occupations: Activist; Journalist; Politician
- Years active: 2017–present
- Organization: Hunters Bookstore
- Title: Councillor for Sha Tin District Council
- Term: 2019–2021
- Political party: Civic Party

Leticia Wong Man-huen (Chinese: 黃文萱; Wade–Giles: Wong^{4} Man^{4} Hyun^{1}; born 18 October 1992) is a Hong Kong activist and former politician. After working as a politics reporter for Sing Tao Daily, in 2019 she was elected to the Sha Tin District Council as a candidate from the Civic Party. Wong resigned as a councillor following the imposition of oath-taking requirements in 2021, and subsequently opened an independent bookshop in Sham Shui Po.

== Early life and education ==
Wong was born in 1992 in City One, a housing estate in Sha Tin in the New Territories of Hong Kong, where she was raised. After attending Pui Ching Primary School and Heep Yunn School, Wong began studying for a bachelor's degree in journalism and communication from the Chinese University of Hong Kong.

While at university, Wong was a badminton player, placing second at the Hong Kong Intermediate Women's Doubles and Mixed Doubles Championship. She also founded the social enterprise group The Leftovers (豐剩; Fung^{1} Zing^{6}), which subsequently won the Most Socially Responsible Award at the 2012 Hong Kong Social Enterprise Challenge Championship.

After graduating from university, Wong worked for two years as a political reporter for Sing Tao Daily, reporting on Hong Kong elections. She concurrently studied for a master's degree in global political economy at the Chinese University of Hong Kong.

== Activism ==
=== District Councillor (2019–2021) ===
In 2019, Wong stood as a candidate for the Civic Party for the Sha Tin District Council, representing City One. In a surprise, she defeated the incumbent Wong Ka-wing, of the New People's Party, with 5122 votes. She became the first woman to represent City One in the district council.

Following the passing of Public Offices (Candidacy and Taking Up Offices) (Miscellaneous Amendments) Ordinance 2021, which imposed oath-taking requirements on district councillors, including swearing to uphold the Hong Kong Basic Law and pledge allegiance to the Hong Kong Special Administration Region, Wong announced that she did not intend to take the oath, indicating that she would resign. On 1 June 2021, she was among 260 lawmakers who declined to take the oath and formally resigned from the district councils, with her resignation taking effect on 4 June.

=== Hunters Bookstore (2021–present) ===
In 2022, Wong founded an independent bookshop, Hunters Bookstore, at 110 Ki Lung Street in Sham Sui Po. The shop was named after Hunter × Hunter, Wong's favourite anime series. In 2024, the bookshop received press attention after selling candles reading "35/5", which was seen to be a reference to the 35th anniversary of the Tiananmen Square protests and massacre. In 2025, Wong hosted a talk at Hunters, with participants including politician Margaret Ng and comic book artist Zunzi, which was criticised by elements of the pro-Beijing media due to the talk's perceived anti-China bias. Wong is also the editor of Hunters' magazine, Status Quo, which features interviews with prominent figures, such as pro-democracy musician Denise Ho, and reports on Hong Kong society and culture, such as the closure on Stand News.

On 24 June 2026, Wong was arrested by Hong Kong Police Force, alongside her husband, on suspicion of violating the Safeguarding National Security Ordinance. Wong was accused of selling "seditious publications", including books that "indicated hatred against the Hong Kong government, judiciary, and law enforcement agencies", as well receiving funds from "foreign political organisations". Evidence cited by the police included a copy of The Troublemaker, a biography of dissident Jimmy Lai, being found in the bookshop.

The Committee to Protect Journalists called on Hong Kong authorities to immediately release Wong following her arrest. On 26 June, after two days of detention at Sham Shui Po police station, Wong was released on bail pending further investigation, and was ordered to return to the station on 24 June.

on 7 July 2026, two weeks after her arrest, Wong reopened Hunters Bookstore.

== See also ==
- Book censorship in Hong Kong
- List of Hong Kong national security cases
