= List of Hong Kong national security cases in 2024 =

The list below shows cases concerning the National Security laws of Hong Kong in 2024, including arrests, charges, investigations and enforcement operations made or conducted under the national security laws.

The Law of the People's Republic of China on Safeguarding National Security in the Hong Kong Special Administrative Region (National Security Law, or NSL) was imposed by the National People's Congress of China and came into effect on 30 June 2020. A second national security legislation, the Safeguarding National Security Ordinance (National Security Ordinance, SNSO), was enacted by the Legislative Council of Hong Kong to implement Article 23 of Hong Kong's constitution, the Basic Law, and took effect on 23 March 2024. The police operations involving national security elements are conducted by the National Security Department of the Hong Kong Police Force (National Security Department, NSD) in spite of suspected crimes neither related to the NSL nor the national security ordinance.

As of 1 September 2026, a total of 415 individuals had been arrested on suspicion of acts and activities endangering national security since the national security law was enacted, some of whom have been sentenced to jail.

== Cases ==
=== Online posts (18 January 2024) ===
A 35-year-old male surnamed Tsang was arrested on 18 January 2024 in Sha Tin by national security police, and charged with sedition over posts he had made on the LIHKG forum which were alleged to have incited hatred towards the Hong Kong and central government. His home was searched the following day. On 22 March, Tsang pleaded guilty to having made what local media reported as 36 messages of "seditious" nature. He was sentenced to 5 months in prison on 10 April.

Name	Age	Accused of	Status
Tsang Kwok-hei	35	Sedition	Pleaded guilty jail for 5 months

=== Social media posts ahead of Tiananmen anniversary (May/June 2024) ===
On 28 May 2024, the police arrested five women and a man, for allegedly making posts on social media that "incited hatred" against the government. The arrested included Chow Hang-tung, who was remanded in custody for her subversion case, as well as her mother. They were accused of anonymously posting on a social media page since April 2024, using an upcoming sensitive date to incite hatred towards the central government, the HKSAR government, and judicial institutions. They are also accused of encouraging netizens to organize or participate in illegal activities. The arrests were the first under the Safeguarding National Security Ordinance. Media noted that the arrests were ahead of the anniversary of the 4 June 1989 crackdown on protesters around Tiananmen Square in Beijing. Two further arrests related to the case followed on 29 May and 3 June; the former arrest, of a woman surnamed Poon, was also on suspicion of violation of the Beijing-imposed national security law through funding activists including UK-based Nathan Law.

Name	Age	Accused of	Status
Chow Hang-tung	38	Sedition	Not charged (see Hong Kong Alliance)
Chow Lau Wah-chun	65	Sedition	Not charged
Lau Ka-yee	?	Sedition	Not charged
Katrina Chan Kim-kam	37	Sedition	Not charged
Lee Ying-chi	?	Sedition	Not charged
Kwan Chun-pong	?	Sedition	Not charged
?	?	Sedition	Not charged
Poon Yau-chui	53	Sedition, Financing secession	Not charged
?	?	?	Not charged

=== Tiananmen anniversary (4 June 2024) ===
Alexandra Wong in 2016

According to local media, Alexandra Wong was arrested on 4 June 2024, the anniversary of Tiananmen crackdown for sedition by chanting slogans that afternoon. It was believed she was not charged. Three others were also arrested but not on national security grounds.

Name	Age	Accused of	Status
Alexandra Wong	68	Sedition	Not charged

=== T-shirt with banned slogan and mask (12 June 2024) ===
On 12 June 2024, Chu Kai-pong, a male c. 27 years old, was intercepted in Shek Mun by police and charged with "doing with a seditious intention an act or acts that had a seditious intention", failing to show proof of identity to police, and loitering with intent. He had worn a T-shirt with the slogan "Liberate Hong Kong, revolution of our times", and a yellow mask with the letters "FDNOL", the shorthand for the slogan "Five demands, not one less". He was denied bail under the Safeguarding National Security Ordinance on 14 June. Having pleaded guilty to one count of sedition on 16 September, he was sentenced to 14 months in jail on 19 September after a magistrate ruled that Chu had intended to disrupt the peace and stir up hatred against the Hong Kong government. The jail term included seven months discount for the guilty plea of Chu. The starting point of 21 months for the sentence included three months as a deterrent for his earlier sedition offence.

Name	Age	Accused of	Status
Chu Kai-pong (Note: First to be charged and sentenced under the Safeguarding National Security Ordinance)	c. 27	Sedition	Pleaded guilty jail for 14 months

=== Online posts (June 2024) ===
A 58-year-old male surnamed Au was charged with sedition under the Safeguarding National Security Ordinance and taken into custody on 21 June 2024, with no precise arrest date having been made public by police, over 200-odd social media posts in the form of statements and images on YouTube, Facebook and X (Twitter) between 23 March and 19 June. The posts reportedly involved the Cultural Revolution-era words "revolution is no crime, to rebel is justified", and called for the Chinese Communist Party to be dissolved and for CCP General Secretary Xi Jinping and Hong Kong Chief Executive John Lee to step down. On 19 September, Au was sentenced to 14 months in jail. The sentence included a one-third discount from the starting point of 21 months on account of Au's guilty plea. That starting point had included three months as a deterrent for an earlier similar offence of Au.

Name	Age	Accused of	Status
Au Kin-wai	c. 58	Sedition	Pleaded guilty jail for 14 months

=== Graffiti on back of bus seats (23 June 2024) ===
A 29-year-old male surnamed Chung was arrested in Tseung Kwan O on 23 June 2024, per a police statement released on 25 June, for "doing with a seditious intention an act or acts that had a seditious intention", and for "destroying or damaging property". His charges, which were under the Safeguarding National Security Ordinance, related to allegedly having scrawled words on the back of seats of different public buses in March and April 2024. On 19 September he was sentenced to 10 months in prison for three counts of the sedition charges, while the two property damage charges were dropped. The sentence included a one-third reduction for Chung's guilty plea.

Name	Age	Accused of	Status
Chung Man-kit	29	Sedition	Pleaded guilty jail for 10 months

=== Fake suicide note (30 August 2024) ===
A 41-year-old male and a 28-year-old female were arrested on 30 August 2024 over allegations of "seditious intentions" under the Safeguarding National Security Ordinance. They were believed by national security police to be behind a fake suicide note that had been widely shared online, in which an apparent suicide of a Hong Kong academic days earlier was linked to the developments in Hong Kong since the 2019 protests.

Name	Age	Accused of	Status
Unknown	41	Sedition	Not charged
Unknown (female)	28	Sedition	Not charged

=== Online posts (12 November 2024) ===
A 57-year-old male surnamed Chow was arrested on 12 November 2024 in Hung Hom under the Safeguarding National Security Ordinance. National security police accused him of "repeatedly publishing online posts with seditious intentions". On 8 April 2025 Chow pleaded guilty to one count of "knowingly publishing publications that had a seditious intention", specifically to having published seditious comments on various social media between March and November 2024. His sentence of one year included a one-third discount for his timely guilty plea. His sentencing had previously been adjourned in February pending a ruling by the Court of Final Appeal in a case of Tam Tak-chi.

Name	Age	Accused of	Status
Chow Kim-ho	57	Sedition	Pleaded guilty jail for 12 months

=== Graffiti (December 2024) ===
In December, a 53-year-old man surnamed Lee was arrested after a technician had discovered slogans written in a lift and alerted police, who identified Lee as the perpetrator through reviewing CCTV footage. Other slogans, which had been written since May 2024, had been discovered earlier by police. The slogans referred to Taiwan independence, ridiculed CCP General Secretary Xi Jinping, and spoke in highly negative terms about the Chinese Communist Party and the Hong Kong government. On 1 April 2025, Lee was sentenced to 10 months jail for sedition and criminal damage after having pleaded guilty. On 8 April, the judge Victor So removed four days from the sentence, saying that there had been a miscalculation.

Name	Age	Accused of	Status
Ernest Lee	53	Sedition	Pleaded guilty jail for nearly 10 months: Act with seditious intention; Criminal damage (Non-NSL offence)
