= List of Hong Kong national security cases in 2026 =

The list below shows cases concerning the National Security laws of Hong Kong in 2026, including arrests, charges, investigations and enforcement operations made or conducted under the national security laws.

The Law of the People's Republic of China on Safeguarding National Security in the Hong Kong Special Administrative Region (National Security Law, or NSL) was imposed by the National People's Congress of China and came into effect on 30 June 2020. A second national security legislation, the Safeguarding National Security Ordinance (National Security Ordinance, SNSO), was enacted by the Legislative Council of Hong Kong to implement Article 23 of Hong Kong's constitution, the Basic Law, and took effect on 23 March 2024. The police operations involving national security elements are conducted by the National Security Department of the Hong Kong Police Force (National Security Department, NSD) in spite of suspected crimes neither related to the NSL nor the national security ordinance.

As of 1 September 2026, a total of 415 individuals had been arrested on suspicion of acts and activities endangering national security since the national security law was enacted, some of whom have been sentenced to jail.

== Cases ==
=== Flyers with anti-government content (21 April 2026) ===
On 21 April 2026, an approximately 55-year-old male construction worker surnamed Wong was arrested by national security police, as only transpired later. On 21 May, he was brought to court and pleaded guilty to two counts of "doing with a seditious intention an act or acts that had a seditious intention", an offence under the National Security Ordinance. Specifically, he was alleged to have, on two separate occasions in October 2024 and December 2025, thrown flyers from an apartment in On Tat Estate. The flyer on the second of these occasions called for a boycott of the legislative election that month. His case was adjourned to 9 June.

| Name | Age | Accused of | Status |
|---|---|---|---|
| Raymond Wong | 55 | Sedition | |

=== Bookstores (24 June 2026) ===
On 24 June 2026, 33-year-old Leticia Wong and a 32-year-old man were arrested on suspicion of sedition. Police allege they displayed and sold "seditious" books that promoted hatred toward Hong Kong authorities, the judiciary, and law enforcement, and that they received funding from foreign political organizations. Leticia Wong was a former pro-democracy district councillor and the co-founder of Hunter Bookstore, and she was also accusedwith money laundering.

Two more bookstores Have a Nice Stay and Greenfield Bookstore were raided by the police in July, where five were arrested.

| Name | Age | Accused of | Status |
|---|---|---|---|
| Leticia Wong | 33 | Sedition | |
| Unknown | 32 | Sedition | |
| Unknown | | Sedition | |
| Unknown | | Sedition | |
| Unknown | | Sedition | |
| Unknown | | Sedition | |
| Unknown | | Sedition | |

=== Alleged sedition (9 July 2026) ===
A 52-year-old man, Law Yiu-fai, was arrested in Eastern District on 9 July 2026 for alleged sedition through repeated social media posts, and charged on 7 October with "knowingly publishing publications that had a seditious intention", an offence under the National Security Ordinance. Prior to the police statement from 9 October, the arrest had not been known.

| Name | Age | Accused of | Status |
|---|---|---|---|
| Law Yiu-fai | 52 | Sedition | |

=== Alleged sedition (21 August 2026) ===
A 45-year-old woman was arrested in the early morning of 21 August 2026 at the West Kowloon Law Courts Building. According to a police statement, she was suspected of acting with seditious intention, disorder in public places, and obstructing police. The woman was reported to have queued up for a place in the public gallery, to hear the verdict for Lee Cheuk-yan, Chow Hang-tung and the Hong Kong Alliance that was on trial at the same time as the two former lead figures.

| Name | Age | Accused of | Status |
|---|---|---|---|
| Unknown (female) | 45 | Sedition | Not charged |

=== Prince Edward attack anniversary (31 August 2026) ===
Three people, two men and one woman, were re-arrested by the national security police on 3 September 2026 after first having been arrested on 31 August. As per a police statement issued on 5 September, they were suspected of having spread "false information" through "holding bouquets and shouting seditions slogans" outside Prince Edward station at the anniversary of the attack on 31 August. Local news reported that two of the arrested were former pro-democracy district councillor Virginia Fung and activist Chan Kwun-yuk. Three more individuals were arrested between 27 and 28 September over the same offence. Two more arrests were made on 30 September: independent journalist Tang Ho-wing (known as "Boomhead") and – as per local news outlets – activist Lee Ying-chi.

| Name | Age | Accused of | Status |
|---|---|---|---|
| Chan Kwun-yuk | ? | Sedition | Not charged |
| Virginia Fung King-man | ? | Sedition | Not charged |
| Tam | ? | Sedition | Not charged |
| | ? | Sedition | Not charged |
| | ? | Sedition | Not charged |
| | ? | Sedition | Not charged |
| Tang Ho-wing | ? | Sedition | Not charged |
| Lee Ying-chi | ? | Sedition | Not charged |

=== Displaying seditious publication (7 September 2026) ===
A 61-year-old woman surnamed Yang appeared at the West Kowloon Magistrates' Courts on 7 September 2026 for the first mention of her case. She was charged with displaying publications with a seditious intention, specifically the display of such materials in her flat in Tin Shui Wai, including on her door, her living room window, and in the corridor. The judge adjourned the case to 21 September to allow for her psychiatric condition to be assessed, as she had given repetitive answers not pertaining to his questions. She was remanded at a psychiatric centre. On 16 October, Yang was sentenced to three months in a psychiatric hospital, as had been recommended by a psychiatric report.

| Name | Age | Accused of | Status |
|---|---|---|---|
| Yang Chau-kei | 61 | Sedition | Found guilty 3-month hospital order for: Sedition |

=== Alleged sedition parallel to selling insurance (6 October 2026) ===
On 6 October 2026, national security police arrested a man and a woman, both aged 38, in Kowloon on suspicion of violating the National Security Ordinance, according to a police statement issued two days later. The two were accused of sedition, specifically by having "stoked hatred against the constitutional order of the city" through "various" social media pages, and that insurance products had been sold for profit through these activities. Local media reported the identity of the male as Wong Ka-ho, a former member of localist groups. The two were granted bail pending investigation.

| Name | Age | Accused of | Status |
|---|---|---|---|
| Wong Ka-ho | 38 | Sedition | |
| Unknown (female) | 38 | Sedition | |
