= HKSAR v Tong Ying Kit =

2021 Hong Kong national security case

- Judiciary of Hong Kong
- Court: Court of First Instance
- Full case name: HKSAR v Tong Ying Kit
- Decided: 27 July 2021
- Citation: HCCC 280/2020; [2021] HKCFI 2200
- Transcript: HKSAR v Tong Ying Kit [2021] HKCFI 2200

Case history
- Subsequent actions: Sentencing: HKSAR v Tong Ying Kit HKSAR v Tong Ying Kit [2021] HKCFI 2239; No merits appeal pursued
- Related actions: HKSAR v Tong Ying Kit [2020] HKCFI 2133; Tong Ying Kit v Secretary for Justice [2021] HKCFI 1397 ; [2021] HKCA 912

Court membership
- Judges sitting: Esther Toh; Anthea Pang Po-kam; Wilson Chan Ka-shun

Case opinions
- Decision by: Toh, Pang and Chan JJ

Keywords
- National security; incitement to secession; terrorist activities; political slogan; jury trial

HKSAR v Tong Ying Kit [2021] HKCFI 2200 was the first trial and conviction under the Hong Kong National Security Law (NSL). Reuters described the verdict as a landmark case with long-term implications for the application of the law and Hong Kong's common-law system. Tong Ying-kit was convicted by a three-judge panel of the Court of First Instance of incitement to secession and terrorist activities arising from his conduct on 1 July 2020, when he rode a motorcycle through Wan Chai while displaying a flag bearing the slogan "Liberate Hong Kong, revolution of our times" and ultimately collided with a group of police officers.

The court held that the slogan was not required to have one exclusive meaning. The question was whether, viewed as a whole and in the particular circumstances in which Tong displayed it, the slogan was capable of inciting secession. It found that Tong understood it to carry a secessionist meaning and intended both to communicate that meaning and to incite others to separate Hong Kong from the People's Republic of China (PRC). On the terrorism count, the court found that Tong's driving involved serious violence against persons and dangerous activities seriously jeopardising public safety or security, caused grave harm to society, and was carried out with a view to intimidating the public in pursuit of a political agenda.

The case was tried without a jury after the Secretary for Justice issued a certificate under Article 46 of the NSL. Tong unsuccessfully challenged the certificate to the Court of Appeal, which treated its issuance as a prosecutorial decision subject only to limited judicial review.

On 30 July 2021, Tong was sentenced to six and a half years' imprisonment for incitement to secession and eight years for terrorist activities. The sentences were made partly concurrent, producing a total term of nine years. He was also disqualified from driving for ten years. Although his lawyers initially announced an appeal, no merits appeal was ultimately pursued.

== Background ==
The NSL came into force in Hong Kong on 30 June 2020. The following day, protests were held on Hong Kong Island against the legislation. Tong, then aged 23 (he was 24 by the time of sentencing), rode a motorcycle through Wan Chai with a black flag mounted behind him bearing the words "光復香港 時代革命" and their English translation, "LIBERATE HONG KONG REVOLUTION OF OUR TIMES". Police formed several checklines and directed him to stop. At the final checkline at the junction of Jaffe Road and O'Brien Road, Tong's motorcycle collided with police officers, injuring three of them. The officers were briefly hospitalized, but were found to have suffered no injuries more serious than a thumb dislocation. Tong was then arrested at the scene.

On 2 July, the Hong Kong government issued a statement saying that the slogan "nowadays connotes 'Hong Kong independence'", separating Hong Kong from the PRC, altering Hong Kong's legal status, or subverting state power. Lawyers interviewed by the South China Morning Post stressed at the time that the government's interpretation was not itself legally binding and that criminal liability would ultimately be a matter for the courts. Tong was charged on 3 July with terrorist activities and incitement to secession, becoming the first person charged under the NSL.

== Charges and trial arrangements ==
Tong faced two NSL counts and one alternative offence under local law. Count 1 charged incitement to secession contrary to Articles 20 and 21 of the NSL. The prosecution alleged that by displaying the slogan Tong had incited others to organise, plan, commit or participate in acts aimed at separating Hong Kong from the PRC or unlawfully altering Hong Kong's legal status.

Count 2 charged terrorist activities under Article 24. It alleged that, with a view to coercing the Central People's Government or HKSAR Government, or intimidating the public in order to pursue a political agenda, Tong had committed acts causing or intended to cause grave harm to society by engaging in serious violence against persons or dangerous activities seriously jeopardising public safety or security. Count 3, added before trial as an alternative to Count 2, charged causing grievous bodily harm by dangerous driving under section 36A of the Road Traffic Ordinance.

On 5 February 2021, Secretary for Justice Teresa Cheng issued a certificate under Article 46 of the NSL directing that the case be tried without a jury. The certificate cited the protection of the personal safety of jurors and their families and a real risk that the due administration of justice might otherwise be impaired. The case was therefore tried by Esther Toh, Anthea Pang and Wilson Chan JJ, all designated national security judges. The trial began on 23 June 2021 and lasted 15 hearing days, concluding on 20 July. Tong pleaded not guilty to all three counts.

== Pre-trial proceedings ==
=== Bail and habeas corpus ===
Tong was refused bail at his first court appearance on 6 July 2020 and was remanded in custody pending trial. He subsequently sought a writ of habeas corpus, in proceedings described by the South China Morning Post as the first test of how Hong Kong courts would reconcile common-law rights with the newly imposed NSL. In Tong Ying Kit v HKSAR [2020] HKCFI 2133, the Court of First Instance dismissed the application, holding that the proper route to challenge the magistrate's refusal of bail was a review under section 9J of the Criminal Procedure Ordinance rather than habeas corpus.

The Court of First Instance also took a relatively narrow view of the restriction in Article 42(2). In February 2021, the Court of Final Appeal expressly considered that reasoning in HKSAR v Lai Chee Ying [2021] HKCFA 3. It held that the approach in Tong had fallen into error by treating Article 42(2) as having little practical impact on the ordinary bail regime, whereas the provision created a distinct and more stringent threshold.

=== Non-jury trial challenge ===
Tong challenged Cheng's Article 46 certificate by judicial review. In Tong Ying Kit v Secretary for Justice [2021] HKCFI 1397, Alex Lee J refused leave to apply for judicial review on 20 May 2021. Tong's case proceeded on the premise that, once an indictment had been preferred in the Court of First Instance, he possessed a constitutional right under Article 86 of the Basic Law to trial by jury. The court rejected that contention and held that an accused could receive a fair trial before judges without a jury. Contemporary reporting noted that the use of Article 46 was a significant departure from the ordinary mode of criminal trial in the Court of First Instance.

Before the NSL was enacted, the Hong Kong Bar Association had warned that excluding a jury for an offence capable of attracting more than seven years' imprisonment would be "a significant departure from previous criminal procedure". Reporting on Tong's Article 46 certificate later noted the association's concern that the Secretary for Justice could remove jury trial without residual discretion being left to the court.

The Court of Appeal dismissed Tong's appeal on 22 June 2021 in Tong Ying Kit v Secretary for Justice [2021] HKCA 912. Poon CJHC held that, even assuming that Article 86 entrenched a right to jury trial in the Court of First Instance, the Secretary for Justice's decision to issue an Article 46 certificate was a prosecutorial decision protected by Article 63 of the Basic Law. It was therefore not amenable to conventional judicial review and could be challenged only on the limited grounds applicable to prosecutorial decisions, such as dishonesty, bad faith or exceptional circumstances. Lam VP added that the NSL expressly created trial before three judges as an alternative mode for NSL prosecutions and, where inconsistent local procedural law existed, the NSL prevailed.

=== Expert evidence on the slogan ===
Before trial, the prosecution sought to call historian Professor Lau Chi-pang as an expert concerning the origin, development and meaning of "Liberate Hong Kong, revolution of our times". The defence opposed parts of his report. In HKSAR v Tong Ying Kit [2021] HKCFI 946, the three-judge panel admitted the sections dealing with the historical origin and development of the slogan, holding that they could assist the court in determining its meaning in context.

The court excluded the portions in which Lau sought to give opinions on the meaning of statutory expressions in Articles 20 and 24 of the NSL, including "secession", "altering by unlawful means the legal status" of Hong Kong and "political agenda". It held that interpreting ordinary words in legislation was the function of the court rather than an expert witness.

=== Alternative dangerous-driving count ===
On 7 June 2021, the court allowed the prosecution to add the dangerous-driving charge as an alternative to Count 2. Tong argued that a three-judge panel constituted under Article 46 lacked jurisdiction over a non-NSL offence. The court rejected the argument because the alternative count arose from the same conduct as the two NSL offences and the proceedings as a whole remained criminal proceedings "concerning offences endangering national security".

The panel further held that Article 46 did not require separate tribunals of fact to try NSL and non-NSL charges properly joined in a single indictment. Requiring the terrorism count to be tried by three judges while reserving its alternative dangerous-driving count for a jury or the District Court would, in its view, be contrary to the interests of justice.

== Trial ==
=== Prosecution case ===
The prosecution case had two principal components. For Count 1, it sought to prove that the slogan on Tong's flag was capable, in the circumstances, of conveying a secessionist message and inciting others to separate Hong Kong from the PRC, and that Tong intended that result. For Count 2, it relied on Tong's route through several police checklines and the eventual collision to contend that he had engaged in serious violence or dangerous activities causing grave harm to society in order to intimidate the public and pursue a political agenda.

The court heard evidence from police officers at four checklines along Tong's route, civilians who witnessed the collision, a forensic scientist and expert witnesses concerning the slogan. CCTV and other video footage formed an important part of the evidence concerning Tong's driving.

=== Driving evidence ===
Police witnesses testified that Tong ignored repeated directions to stop at several checklines. At the final checkline at Jaffe Road and O'Brien Road, he passed a stationary car and collided with officers. The defence disputed the prosecution's characterisation of the collision as deliberate. Clive Grossman SC suggested that Tong had lost control after being struck or distracted by a police shield, which the officer concerned denied throwing the shield at him.

A government forensic scientist testified that video footage showed Tong's brake light activating shortly before the collision. Under questioning requested by the defence, he said the apparent timing was consistent with a rider perceiving a danger and making an emergency stop. The defence relied on that evidence to argue that Tong treated the officers as obstacles to be avoided rather than targets. The prosecution, by contrast, argued that Tong's route and repeated refusal to stop showed deliberate conduct directed at the police.

=== Meaning of the slogan ===
A substantial part of the trial concerned the meaning of "Liberate Hong Kong, revolution of our times". Lau, the prosecution expert, traced the slogan to the 2016 New Territories East by-election campaign of Edward Leung and associated it with an objective of separating Hong Kong from the PRC.

The defence called political scientist Eliza Lee Wing-yee and journalism scholar Francis Lee Lap-fung. Their evidence was that the slogan was open and ambiguous and had acquired multiple meanings during the 2019–2020 Hong Kong protests, including expressions of a desire for freedom, democracy or political change not necessarily amounting to independence. Francis Lee testified that it was wrong to assume that the slogan had only one meaning, while acknowledging that it was capable of being understood in a pro-independence sense.

The court ultimately considered that the dispute did not require it to identify a single, universal meaning for the slogan. It framed the question as whether, when the slogan was viewed as a whole and in the circumstances in which Tong displayed it, it was capable of carrying a secessionist meaning and inciting others to commit secession.

=== Defence case and closing submissions ===
At the close of the prosecution case, Grossman made a no-case submission on all three counts. The court ruled that Tong had a case to answer on each count. Tong elected not to testify. He called Eliza Lee Wing-yee and Francis Lee Lap-fung as expert witnesses on the slogan and a factual witness who said Tong had planned to meet friends for lunch that day.

In closing, the defence argued that Tong's conduct did not amount to terrorism and had never endangered Hong Kong society in the sense required by Article 24. It maintained that the collision was accidental and that the slogan's ambiguity prevented the court from inferring the necessary secessionist intention merely from its display. The prosecution argued that Tong's driving was a deliberate challenge to police and that he intended to intimidate the public while advancing a pro-independence political agenda.

== Judgment ==
=== Incitement to secession ===
The court approached incitement according to common-law principles. It held that an incitement could be addressed to the public at large and that the allegedly inciting words had to be considered as a whole, in their surrounding circumstances, by reference to their natural and reasonable effect.

On the slogan itself, the panel did not decide whether it had one meaning or several. It considered that the defence experts' analysis of whether everyone understood the slogan in the same way did not answer the legal question before it, and noted that all three experts accepted that the slogan was at least capable of carrying the secessionist meaning advanced by Lau. The court therefore found it unnecessary to resolve the differences between the experts' approaches. Having regard to the natural and reasonable effect of Tong's display and the particular circumstances of 1 July 2020, it concluded that the slogan was capable of carrying the meaning of separating Hong Kong from the PRC and was capable of inciting others to commit secession.

The court further found that Tong had deliberately chosen the date, place and manner of his conduct to attract public attention, was aware of the newly enacted NSL, and understood the slogan to bear a meaning of Hong Kong independence. It inferred that he intended to communicate that secessionist meaning to others and to incite them to separate Hong Kong from the PRC. Because the court found the "separating the HKSAR from the PRC" limb of Count 1 established, it did not determine the alternative allegation that Tong had incited others to alter Hong Kong's legal status by unlawful means.

=== Terrorist activities ===
Article 24 required the prosecution to prove prohibited conduct causing or intended to cause grave harm to society, together with the requisite purpose of coercing specified governments or organisations or intimidating the public in order to pursue a political agenda.

In assessing the collision, the court accepted the evidence of forensic scientist Dr Tsang Cheuk-nam. Working backwards from the frame in which Tong's brake light illuminated and using a typical reaction time of 0.9 seconds, Tsang identified the probable point at which Tong perceived the danger and decided to brake. The court concluded from that evidence that once Tong chose to overtake the stationary car through the gap, the collision was inevitable because by the time he reacted the motorcycle had already reached the group of officers. It consequently found it unnecessary to determine the disputed allegation that an officer had deliberately thrown his shield at Tong, because the collision would have occurred even without intervention by an object.

More generally, the court found that Tong had deliberately failed to stop at several police checklines, creating danger to police officers, pedestrians and other road users. It held that the collision itself involved serious violence against persons and that "serious violence" referred to the nature of the act rather than requiring proof that the victims had suffered legally serious bodily injuries.

For "grave harm to the society", the judges held that harm under Article 24 was not restricted to physical injury. They characterised Tong's repeated passage through police checklines as a deliberate and serious challenge to the police as a symbol of law and order and concluded that it was capable of causing public fear of a breakdown in public safety and security.

The court also found that Tong intended to draw attention to a political agenda of separating Hong Kong from the PRC and that his conduct was intended to intimidate the public in pursuit of that agenda. Because the "intimidating the public" limb was established, the court did not decide whether Tong had also acted with a view to coercing the Central People's Government or the HKSAR Government. It expressed reservations as to whether the coercion limb had been made out on the facts and as to part of the prosecution's proposed construction of that limb.

=== Verdict ===
The court summarised its findings at paragraph 171. It was satisfied that the flag was capable of inciting secession, that Tong understood and intended to communicate a secessionist meaning, and that he intended to incite others. It also found that his driving amounted to serious violence and/or dangerous activities seriously jeopardising public safety or security, caused grave harm to society, and was carried out with a view to intimidating the public in order to pursue a political agenda.

Tong was accordingly convicted on Counts 1 and 2 on 27 July 2021. Since Count 3 had been pleaded only as an alternative to terrorism, the court did not determine it. The verdict was widely reported as the first conviction under the NSL.

== Sentencing ==
Mitigation was heard on 29 July and sentence was passed the following day in HKSAR v Tong Ying Kit [2021] HKCFI 2239. Grossman submitted that Tong's conduct was at the lower end of the relevant statutory bands, that the collision had not been a deliberate attack intended to inflict serious injury, and that the two offences arose from the same facts and should attract concurrent sentences. He also relied on Tong's personal background, expressed remorse and family circumstances.

For incitement to secession, the court held that the offence was of a "serious nature" under Article 21, placing it in the statutory range of five to ten years. It nevertheless regarded the case as not the worst of its kind because Tong acted alone and the slogan conveyed a general call for separation without an elaborate plan. It adopted a starting point of six and a half years.

For terrorist activities, the court concluded that although the injuries suffered by the officers were not minor, they did not amount to "serious bodily injuries" for the higher Article 24 sentencing tier. The applicable range was therefore three to ten years. It treated the secessionist nature of Tong's political agenda as adding criminality to Count 2. The court expressly rejected a double-counting concern: the secessionist meaning of the slogan was the basis of Count 1 and was not treated as an aggravating factor for that offence, whereas Article 24 could be committed in pursuit of a political agenda that was secessionist or otherwise, making the secessionist character an additional feature of Count 2. It adopted a starting point of eight years.

The court declined to reduce the terms for Tong's expressed remorse because he had pleaded not guilty, and held that his previous good character and family circumstances did not mitigate the serious offences. It imposed six and a half years on Count 1 and eight years on Count 2. Two and a half years of the terrorism sentence were ordered to run consecutively to the secession sentence and the balance concurrently, producing an aggregate sentence of nine years. A ten-year driving disqualification was imposed concurrently with the prison sentence. Applying SJ v Hung Ling Kwok, the court said a disqualification running concurrently with imprisonment should extend beyond the prison term so that it would have practical effect after release, without assuming early release for good conduct.

== Appeal and subsequent proceedings ==
Immediately after sentencing, Grossman said that Tong intended to appeal both conviction and sentence. By January 2022, however, Grossman said that Tong had decided not to pursue an appeal, reportedly by writing a letter from prison.. Lai and Kellogg later wrote that Tong had decided not to file one. Grossman said he had not been told why Tong changed course.

At the criminal trial, Grossman and Lawrence Lau were assigned by the director of legal aid, while Chan Pik-kei acted pro bono. In July 2022, Tong was ordered to pay more than HK$1.38 million in costs arising from unsuccessful collateral legal proceedings, including his habeas corpus application and challenge to the non-jury certificate.

In August 2024, while serving his sentence, Tong was among the first graduates of the Correctional Services Department's Ethics College at Pak Sha Wan Correctional Institution. At the graduation ceremony, he said that he regretted his conduct in 2020, had been misled by biased commentary and false information, and hoped to make amends by contributing to society.

== Reactions ==
The verdict and sentence were criticised by human-rights groups. Amnesty International said that the nine-year sentence confirmed its concerns that the NSL would be used to imprison government critics, and argued that Tong should not have faced a national-security offence carrying the possibility of life imprisonment.

The Hong Kong government defended enforcement of the NSL. After sentencing, Secretary for Security Tang Ping-keung said the government would study the judgment before deciding any further action and highlighted the court's finding that the slogan was capable of carrying a meaning of Hong Kong independence or separation from China.

The European Union also criticised the conviction. EU foreign-policy spokesperson Nabila Massrali said the NSL was being used to stifle political pluralism and the exercise of human rights and political freedoms in Hong Kong, and called for an end to the targeting of people defending democratic rights and freedoms.

Thomas E. Kellogg and Eric Yan-ho Lai criticised the verdict in an October 2021 briefing paper for Georgetown University Law Center's Center for Asian Law, arguing that the court had not adequately engaged with freedom of expression and that its approach to terrorism was broader than international and comparative standards. The same authors later published a 2022 Hong Kong Law Journal article that likewise criticised the verdict's rights analysis, arguing that Article 24 was vague and overbroad and that the court had applied it in a manner departing from international and comparative counter-terrorism standards.

Carole J. Petersen separately criticised the judgment in an October 2021 ASIL Insights article. She argued that the first NSL conviction raised questions about whether the courts were giving adequate effect to the International Covenant on Civil and Political Rights and said the court's analysis could have significant repercussions for other defendants prosecuted under the law.

The Clooney Foundation for Justice's TrialWatch initiative, which monitored the proceedings, gave the trial a grade of D in December 2021. Its expert reviewer, Indian senior advocate Rebecca Mammen John, criticised aspects of the tribunal's independence, the application of the principle of legality and the treatment of freedom of expression. She also criticised the court's treatment of "grave harm" as extending beyond physical injury to a serious challenge to the police as a symbol of law and order.

== Significance ==
As the first completed trial and first conviction under the NSL, HKSAR v Tong Ying Kit required the Court of First Instance to construe and apply incitement to secession under Articles 20 and 21 and terrorist activities under Article 24. It also determined whether Tong's display of "Liberate Hong Kong, revolution of our times" was capable, in its particular context, of inciting secession. The slogan holding was expressly tied to the natural and reasonable effect of Tong's display and "the particular circumstances of this case".

The trial produced the first construction of "terrorist activities" under Article 24. The court held that "causing or intended to cause grave harm to the society" was a distinct element that the prosecution was required to prove, and that "harm" bore its ordinary meaning and was not confined to physical injury. It further held that "serious violence against a person or persons" referred to the nature of the act rather than the injuries it caused, so that whether serious bodily injury resulted was relevant to sentence rather than liability. On the facts, the court held that a blatant and serious challenge to the police force, as a symbol of law and order, was capable of causing grave harm to society by instilling fear among law-abiding members of the public.

Because the court found that Tong had acted with a view to intimidating the public in order to pursue a political agenda, it did not determine whether the alternative "coercion" limb of Article 24 had been established. It nevertheless expressed reservations both about whether coercion had been proved on the facts and about the prosecution's submission that the coercive purpose specified in Article 24 was independent of the requirement that the conduct be undertaken in pursuit of a political agenda.

The judicial review application on the decision made under Article 46 produced a separate appellate ruling on the reviewability of certificates directing trial without a jury. The Court of Appeal held that the Secretary for Justice's decision to issue such a certificate was a prosecutorial decision not subject to ordinary judicial-review scrutiny, although the limited grounds applicable to prosecutorial decisions, including bad faith or dishonesty, remained available.

Tong's subsequent decision not to pursue a merits appeal left the Court of First Instance's interpretation of the substantive NSL offences undisturbed. Lai and Kellogg noted that this meant the judgment remained available as precedent in subsequent national-security proceedings.

== See also ==
- 2020 Hong Kong national security law
- Liberate Hong Kong, revolution of our times
- List of Hong Kong national security cases
- 2019–2020 Hong Kong protests
