= List of Hong Kong national security cases in 2025 =

The list below shows cases concerning the National Security laws of Hong Kong in 2025, including arrests, charges, investigations and enforcement operations made or conducted under the national security laws.

The Law of the People's Republic of China on Safeguarding National Security in the Hong Kong Special Administrative Region (National Security Law, or NSL) was imposed by the National People's Congress of China and came into effect on 30 June 2020. A second national security legislation, the Safeguarding National Security Ordinance (National Security Ordinance, SNSO), was enacted by the Legislative Council of Hong Kong to implement Article 23 of Hong Kong's constitution, the Basic Law, and took effect on 23 March 2024. The police operations involving national security elements are conducted by the National Security Department of the Hong Kong Police Force (National Security Department, NSD) in spite of suspected crimes neither related to the NSL nor the national security ordinance.

As of 1 September 2026, a total of 415 individuals had been arrested on suspicion of acts and activities endangering national security since the national security law was enacted, some of whom have been sentenced to jail.

== Cases ==
=== Online posts (21 January 2025) ===
A 36-year-old male surnamed Li was arrested on 21 January 2025 in Eastern District, and charged under the National Security Ordinance with sedition over posts he had made on Facebook which were alleged to have incited hatred, contempt or disaffection against Hong Kong. He was to appear in court the following day.

| Name | Age | Accused of | Status |
|---|---|---|---|
| Li Chun-kit | 36 | Sedition | Remanded |

=== Online posts (28 April 2025) ===
A 22-year-old male surnamed Chan was arrested on 28 April 2025 in Kowloon, and charged under the National Security Ordinance with sedition over posts he had made on Instagram and X (formerly Twitter) in the period from June 2024 to April 2025 which were alleged to have incited hatred, contempt or disaffection against Hong Kong. On 30 April, Chan was charged with one count of publishing posts with content deemed to be of "seditious intent". On 9 July, on request of the prosecution, the charge was upgraded to inciting subversion.

| Name | Age | Accused of | Status |
|---|---|---|---|
| Chan Ho-hin | 22 | Inciting subversion | Remanded |

=== Relatives of Anna Kwok (30 April 2025) ===
According to a press release issued two days later, on 30 April 2025 police arrested a 68-year-old male and a 35-year-old male in Tseung Kwan O on suspicion of breaching the National Security Ordinance. Local media reported on 2 May, based on unnamed sources, that the two men were the father and brother of Anna Kwok, a US-based activist on whom Hong Kong authorities had previously set a bounty. According to local media, the brother was later released on police bail pending further investigation. The elder Kwok, who was accused of trying to withdraw funds totalling 88,609 Hong Kong dollars, was granted bail on 20 May in High Court, his bail conditions including a cash in bail and surety to the amount of 400,000 HKD in total, and surrendering travel documents. On 26 February 2026, he was sentenced to eight months in jail after having been found guilty of the offence earlier that month.

| Name | Age | Accused of | Status |
|---|---|---|---|
| Kwok Yin-sang | 68 | Collusion | Found guilty, 8-month jail for: Handling an absconder's financial assets |
| Kwok Hoi-shing | 35 | | |

=== Joshua Wong and Nathan Law (6 June 2025) ===
On 6 June 2025, Joshua Wong was arrested in prison over a second national security charge, besides the one for which he was jailed in 2024. He was brought to court the same day. The case was adjourned to 8 August, on which day it was transferred to the High Court.

| Name | Age | Accused of | Status |
|---|---|---|---|
| Joshua Wong Chi-fung | 28 | Collusion | Remanded |

=== Hong Kong Democratic Independence Union (9 July 2025) ===
On 9 July 2025, four males aged from 15 to 47 were arrested for being a member of the Taiwan-based subversive group Hong Kong Democratic Independence Union. On 31 October, the youngest defendant, by then aged 16, pleaded guilty to conspiring to commit secession; according to a statement in court by his barrister, he had been additionally arrested in March. The youngest defendant was sentenced to three years and a half in prison on 15 December.

| Name | Age | Accused of | Status |
|---|---|---|---|
| Unknown | 15 | Inciting secession | Pleaded guilty, 42-month jail for: Inciting secession |
| Unknown | | Subversion | Remanded |
| Unknown | | Subversion | Remanded |
| Unknown | 47 | Subversion | Remanded |

=== Promotional video for "Hong Kong Parliament" (19 July 2025) ===
A 19-year-old female surnamed Lan was arrested by police on 19 July 2025, and charged on 26 August with sedition under the National Security Ordinance, for having allegedly produced two videos for "Hong Kong Parliament" between March and May 2025, and for having advertised for the election of the group previously declared subversive by police. Her bail application was rejected and her case adjourned until 31 October, when she pleaded guilty to one count of sedition. On 13 November 2025, Lan was sentenced to one year in prison for sedition.

| Name | Age | Accused of | Status |
|---|---|---|---|
| Bettie Lan Fei | 19 | Sedition | Pleaded guilty, 12-month jail for: Act with seditious intention |

=== Seditious graffiti (21 July 2025) ===
On 21 July 2025, an 18-year-old man surnamed Leung was arrested by police, on suspicion of having written "seditious words" in a male toilet in China Hong Kong City on three occasions, and to three counts of criminal damage. Leung pleaded guilty to the latter charge, but not to the sedition charge. On 22 July 2026 he was convicted of sedition and remanded. On 12 August he was sentenced to an 18-month probation.

| Name | Age | Accused of | Status |
|---|---|---|---|
| Leung Kai-lok | 18 | Sedition | 18-month probation for: Act with seditious intention |

=== Online posts (November 2025) ===
On 18 November 2025, superintendent Chan On-ming of the police force's National Security Department told reporters that a 68-year-old male had been arrested for alleged sedition, and been charged under the National Security Ordinance. The man had allegedly been making posts inciting hatred against the police on his social media account since September 2024. Additionally, he was alleged to have incited people not to vote or to cast blank votes in the upcoming legislative election. After appearing in court on 20 November, he remained in custody for investigation.

| Name | Age | Accused of | Status |
|---|---|---|---|
| Lam Chung-ming | 68 | Sedition | Remanded |

=== Wang Fuk Court fire ===
==== Miles Kwan (29 November 2025) ====
On 29 November, according to persons familiar with the matter and local media citing unnamed sources, national security police detained a person who was part of a group that had launched an online petition demanding, among other points, government accountability after a deadly blaze tore through an apartment complex in the district of Tai Po days earlier. Police did not immediately reply to a media request for comment. The South China Morning Post reported that the person in question was 24-year-old university student Miles Kwan. On 1 December, Kwan was seen leaving a police station in a taxi. He did not speak to reporters as he left.

| Name | Age | Accused of | Status |
|---|---|---|---|
| Miles Kwan | 24 | Sedition | Not charged |

==== Online comments (3 December 2025) ====
On 3 December, national security police reportedly apprehended a 26-year-old male surnamed Chan for acting with "seditious intention". According to local media, he was the same person as the one behind a YouTube account which had shared at least two livestreams about victims of the Wang Fuk Court fire, with at least one featuring remarks which were considered highly offensive to the victims.

| Name | Age | Accused of | Status |
|---|---|---|---|
| Chan | 26 | Sedition | Not charged |

==== Alleged prejudicing of a national security case and online comments (6 December 2025) ====
On 6 December, police arrested a 71-year-old male named Wong Kwok-ngon, better known by his pen name Wong On-yin, in Sheung Shui for alleged "prejudicing of investigation of offences endangering national security" and "doing an act that has a seditious intention with a seditious intention", according to a press release. It was the first national security detention under the first mentioned alleged offence. His arrest came days after he had been taken in by police and released. Wong was charged with one count of obstructing a national security investigation by disclosing details of a police interview and questions asked during a national security probe, therefore tipping off other potential suspects; and one count of comments inciting hatred against the Hong Kong and central governments regarding the Wang Fuk Court fire. He was denied bail and remained in detention in April 2026, when he was scheduled to stand trial in October 2026.

| Name | Age | Accused of | Status |
|---|---|---|---|
| Wong On-yin | 71 | Obstruction of investigation, Sedition | Remanded |

=== Online comments (29 November 2025) ===
On 29 November, police arrested a 61-year-old male surnamed Chong. According to a charge sheet presented in court on 8 January 2026, he was accused of having published posts on Facebook with "seditious intentions", provoking hatred, contempt or disaffection against China and authorities in Hong Kong, between March 2024 and the day of his arrest. He was remanded in custody on 8 January 2026. On 14 April 2026 he was sentenced to 12 months in jail, after a six-month discount for a guilty plea. He had been charged with sedition under Article 23, based on 53 posts he had made on Facebook, using a public profile, between March 2024 and November 2025. The posts had included comments supporting Hong Kong and Taiwan independence, and such that called for ending the rule of the Chinese Communist Party.

| Name | Age | Accused of | Status |
|---|---|---|---|
| Raymond Chong Wai-man | 61 | Sedition | Pleaded guilty, 12-month jail for: Sedition |

=== Illegal weapons training (11 and 12 December 2025) ===
On 11 December 2025, nine males were arrested by national security for alleged subversion, specifically for allegedly having conducted "illegal drilling", a crime as per a provision in the national security ordinance, between 2021 and December 2025. Six of the men were encountered by police in an industrial building in San Po Kong during the raid, where one was providing training to the other five at the time. A female was arrested the next day in relation to the same case and under the same provision. Two of the males, surnamed Pang and Lee, were charged with subversion and denied bail on 15 December, while the female was released on bail, along with other arrestees. Three further people were charged with the subversion offence on 14 May 2026, one of whom was additionally charged with the non-NSL offence of allegedly possessing child pornography, while another was additionally charged with allegedly possessing explosives and radio communications apparatus without a licence.

| Name | Age | Accused of | Status |
|---|---|---|---|
| Gallian Pang | 24 | Subversion | |
| Lee Chun-sum | 25 | Subversion | |
| Wong Kit-lun | 20 | Subversion | |
| Tang Ngai-pok | 23 | Subversion | |
| Chan Hiu-chun | 23 | Subversion | |
