= Koo Sze-yiu =

Hong Kong activist (1949–2026)

- 古思堯
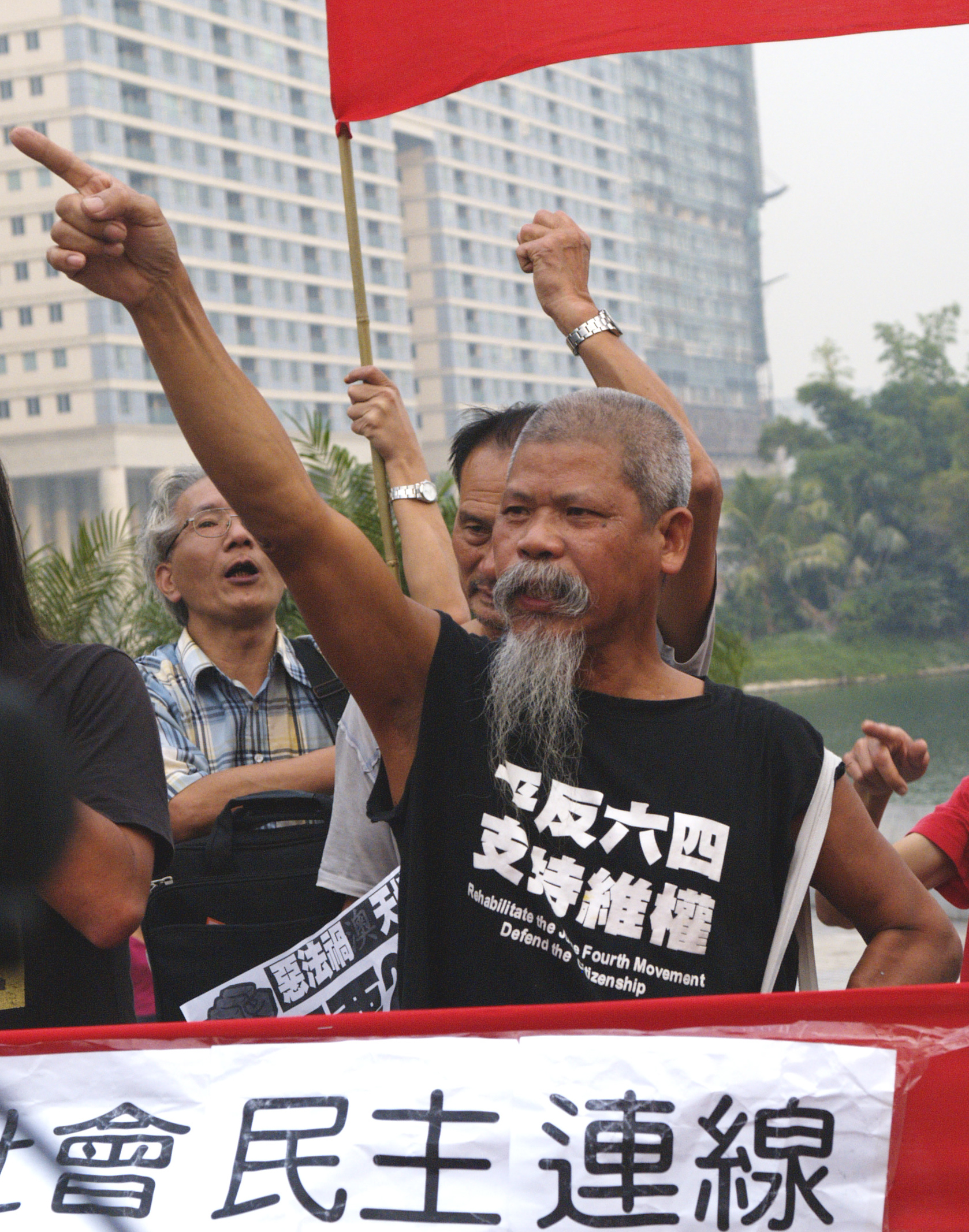
- Koo in 2008 opposing Macau national security legislation
- Born: 5 April 1946; Shiqi, Zhongshan, China
- Died: 8 April 2026 (aged 80); Hong Kong
- Known for: Multiple convictions over anti-communism protests
- Political party: Macau Federation of Trade Unions (until 1980s)
- Movement: Baodiao movement Maoism (until 1989)

Koo Sze-yiu
- Traditional Chinese: 古思堯
- Simplified Chinese: 古思尧
Transcriptions
Standard Mandarin
- Hanyu Pinyin: Gǔ Sīyáo
Yue: Cantonese
- Jyutping: Gu^{2} Si^{1} Yiu^{4}

Koo Sze-yiu (Chinese: 古思堯; Jyutping: Gu^{2} Si^{1} Yiu^{4}; 5 April 1946 (Note: The birth year of Koo was legally and officially documented as 1946, and this version has been widely adopted by media, Hong Kong Judiciary, as well as his close friends and family on his personal obituary; however, Koo once claimed that he was born in 1949 during an unofficial YouTube interview, while the veracity of such claim would be unverifiable.)–8 April 2026), also known by his nickname "Long Beard" (長鬚), was a Hong Kong anti-communist activist. He was most famous for carrying handmade coffins and burning flags at protests, and having been jailed 14 times over his protests.

== Early life ==
Koo was born in 5 April 1946 in Shiqi, a subdistrict of Zhongshan, China. His father was executed by communist firing squad after accused of being a rightist. Koo then moved to Macau, then a Portuguese colony, and studied in a left-wing school before working as an apprentice in a shipyard. He claimed to have been a Maoist in his early years, joining the leftists to storm the Macau Government office and clashed with the police in the 12-3 incident in 1966. He was a core member of the Macau Federation of Trade Unions. In the 1970s, he denounced the rigged selection of the union leader, and was forced to flee to Hong Kong after what he described as "betrayal" by colleagues. Koo turned against the Chinese Communist Party after the 1989 Tiananmen Square crackdown on student activists demanding democracy in the People's Republic of China, and urged the ending of the one-party dictatorship.

== Activism ==
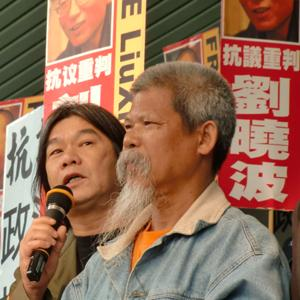
"Long Hair" and "Long Beard" – Leung Kwok-hung with Koo in 2010

After 1989, Koo became committed to Hong Kong's social movements, showing up in different protests, including 1 July marches, and continued after the handover of Hong Kong in 1997. Koo was always seen protesting with Leung Kwok-hung, an ex-MP known as "Long Hair" (長毛) who was also a left-wing activist, and best known for carrying a handmade coffin to protests to show his disapproval of Beijing.

As part of the Baodiao movement, he landed on the Senkaku Islands, or Diaoyutai Islands, on 15 August 2012. He and others were arrested by Japan, and released two days later after Beijing's intervention. At a televised press conference after arriving back in Hong Kong, Koo swore at a man behind him, telling him to "move over, diu nei lou mou ('fuck your mother!')" (企開啲啦，屌你老母), which surprised audiences and became a local meme.

Following the imposition of the national security law in 2020, Koo said he disagreed with violent clashes and the Hong Kong independence movement, but admitted only radical acts could be effective as both the PRC and Hong Kong Governments no longer tolerate peaceful protests. Koo also called on youngsters not to give up even if jailed for marches and assemblies, saying the authorities should take the blame.

=== Convictions and jail ===
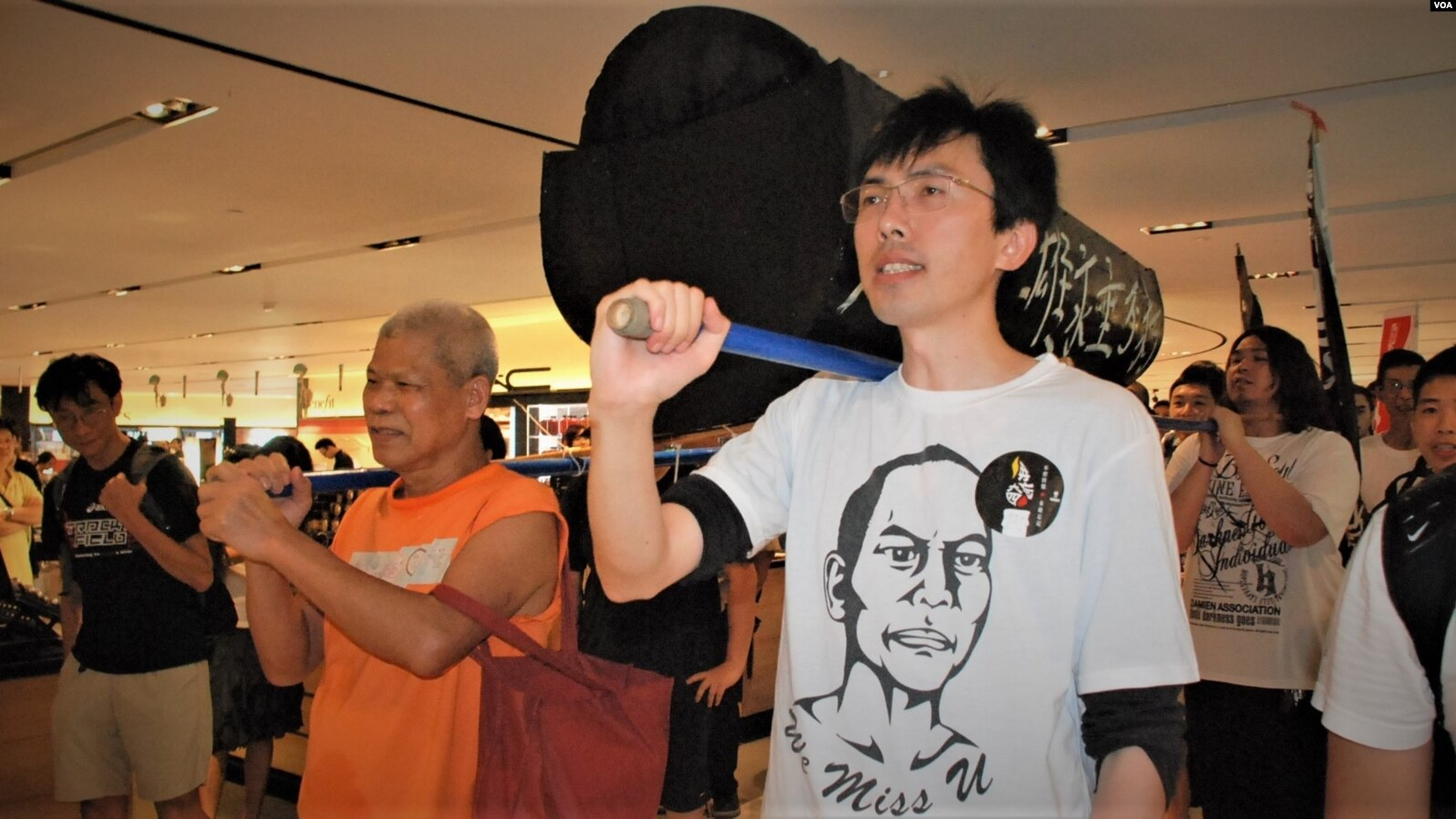
Koo (left) and Avery Ng with the famous mock coffin in 2013

Koo was jailed at least twelve times over different offences.

In 1998, Koo, along with Tsang Kin-shing, Leung Kwok-hung, and Lau Shan-ching, was fined HK$3,000 for disorder in public spaces over burning mock coffins during the visit by Jiang Zemin, paramount leader of China. In 2000, Koo was jailed 14 days over two protests during Legislative Council proceedings.

In 2001, Koo was fined HK$3,000 for graffiti on a Hong Kong emblem during a protest. In December 2008, Koo was accused of attacking guards of the Legislative Council during protests against the public offering of Link REIT, a real estate investment trust, and was jailed for seven days after choosing not to pay the HK$2,000 fine.

Between 2012 and 2018, Koo was jailed for his multiple burnings and desecrating of the PRC and Hong Kong flags. On 18 February 2013, Koo was jailed for nine months for desecrating the national and Hong Kong flags in protest at human rights abuses in the People's Republic of China and the alleged murder of Li Wangyang. The jail term was reduced to 4.5 months on appeal.

In April 2013, he was given a four-month suspended sentence, reduced to two months on appeal, over an attempt to burn the national flag at the Hong Kong Liaison Office. In 2016, Koo was sentenced to 6 weeks’ imprisonment for having burnt the Hong Kong flag during the annual 1 July March in 2015; he celebrated his fifth jail sentence near the court.

On 27 March 2018, Koo was jailed for the sixth time, after desecrating the PRC and Hong Kong flags during a candlelight vigil in memory of Nobel Peace Prize winner Liu Xiaobo in 2017, and during the Chinese National Day protest in 2017, and the New Year march in 2018. He was sent to jail for six months before chanting "all hail democracy", "all hail human rights", and "say no to the Chinese Community Party".

On 25 June 2019, Koo was jailed for six weeks after desecrating the Hong Kong flag by writing "Shameful Hong Kong Government" in protest against disqualifying Lau Siu-lai's MP seat, amounting to his seventh jail sentence.

On 28 January 2021, Koo received his tenth jail sentence of four months after desecrating the PRC flag by writing "white terror" and "fascist horror" and flying it upside down, to voice out support with 15 democrats charged with illegal assembly. He vowed in court to breach the National Security Law imposed upon Hong Kong by the PRC.

On 14 April 2021, just days after finishing his earlier jail term, Koo was jailed for five months over illegal assemblies with Joshua Wong on 5 October 2019, the day the Prohibition on Face Covering Regulation was enacted.

Koo was again arrested on 4 February 2022, reportedly under the security law for suspected incitement of subversion, before his planned demonstration outside the Hong Kong Liaison Office to protest the PRC's Winter Olympics and call attention to political activists behind bars. Koo was charged with attempting to commit a seditious act over a one-metre long coffin and a white flag with language including "down with the Chinese Communist Party" and "end one-party rule" found at his home, and was denied bail. He was jailed for 9 months after the judge found him guilty.

On 18 December 2023, Koo was fined HK$6,000 for breaching fire safety regulations. The Hong Kong Fire Services Department had not informed him of their removal of his belongings from the open areas in an industrial building. Local media reported that he had been in hospital at the time of the removal.

On 16 February 2024, Koo was sentenced to nine months in prison for "attempting or preparing to do an act with a seditious intention", after he was found guilty of planning a protest against the 2023 District Council elections. He was released in September 2024.

== Personal life and death ==
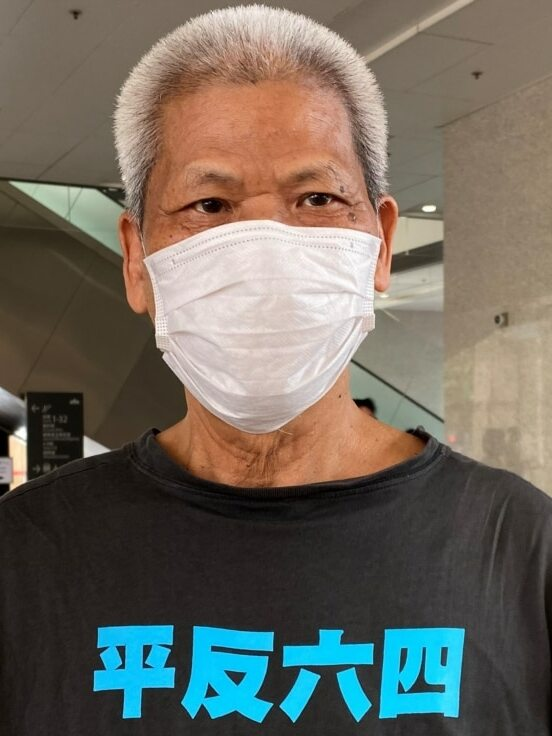
Koo outside of a court in 2022

Koo's wife and daughter lived in mainland China, and visited Koo in 2012.

Koo said in 2020 he was diagnosed with end-stage colorectal cancer. After his final release from jail in 2024, Koo stayed in the hospital for a few months. He was again sent to hospital in February 2026, and died there on 8 April 2026 after his kidney failure worsened.

== See also ==
- Hong Kong 1 July marches
