= Safeguarding National Security Ordinance =

Legislation of Hong Kong

Legislative Council of Hong Kong
- Long title: An Ordinance to improve the law for safeguarding national security in the Hong Kong Special Administrative Region of the People’s Republic of China; and to provide for related matters.
- Citation: Ordinance No. 6 of 2024 (Instrument A305)
- Territorial extent: Hong Kong; Worldwide (extra-territorial for some offences)
- Passed: 19 March 2024
- Signed by: John Lee Ka-chiu
- Signed: 22 March 2024
- Effective: 23 March 2024
- White paper: Public Consultation on Basic Law Article 23 Legislation

Legislative history
- Introduced by: Secretary for Security; Chris Tang
- Introduced: 8 March 2024
- First reading: 8 March 2024
- Second reading: 19 March 2024
- Third reading: 19 March 2024
- Voting summary: 89 voted for; None voted against
- Committee report: Report of the Bills Committee on Safeguarding National Security Bill

Summary
- To comprehensively address the national security risks at present and those that may emerge in the future in Hong Kong and to fully implement the constitutional duties and obligations as stipulated under Article 23 of the Basic Law, the 5.28 Decision and the 2020 Hong Kong National Security Law
- Status: In force

Safeguarding National Security Ordinance
- Traditional Chinese: 維護國家安全條例
- Simplified Chinese: 维护国家安全条例
Transcriptions
Standard Mandarin
- Hanyu Pinyin: Wéihù Guójiā Ānquán Tiáolì
Yue: Cantonese
- Jyutping: wai4 wu6 gwok3 gaa1 on1 cyun4 tiu4 lai6

The Safeguarding National Security Ordinance (Chinese: 維護國家安全條例) is a local law of Hong Kong. It was introduced by the Government of Hong Kong on 8 March 2024, passed by the Legislative Council on 19 March 2024, and took effect on 23 March 2024. The ordinance was enacted to implement Article 23 of the Hong Kong Basic Law.

On national security grounds, the ordinance gives new powers to the government to investigate external interference, theft of state secrets, insurrection, and treason, with penalties up to life imprisonment for those found guilty of certain crimes specified by the law. It is the second national security legislation implemented in the city, the first being the central government-implemented Law of the People's Republic of China on Safeguarding National Security in the Hong Kong Special Administrative Region. Foreign media and governments expressed concern of the "sweeping" and "tough" clauses, which some considered to be more far-reaching than and go beyond the central government's one, that could further reduce the space for dissident views and erode autonomy of Hong Kong.

Instead of the usual six-month period, the authorities took 50 days from the launch of a public consultation to writing it into law, due to a sense of urgency underscored by Hong Kong and Beijing authorities. Critics said the bill was rushed through in a fast-track process without meaningful discussions.

== Background ==
=== Article 23 ===
Article 23 of the Hong Kong Basic Law (BL 23) states:

The Hong Kong Special Administrative Region shall enact laws on its own to prohibit any act of treason, secession, sedition, subversion against the PRC government, or theft of state secrets, to prohibit foreign political organisations or bodies from conducting political activities in the Region, and to prohibit political organisations or bodies of the Region from establishing ties with foreign political organisations or bodies.

An attempt at enacting legislation to satisfy the requirements in Article 23 was made in 2003 but was shelved indefinitely after hundreds of thousands of protestors demonstrated against it, resulting in the pro-Beijing Liberal Party opposing the bill and the subsequent lack of a majority to pass the bill in the Legislative Council.

Xi Jinping's accession to General Secretary of the Chinese Communist Party, the top position in November 2012, marked a more hard-line authoritarian approach, most notably with repression in Xinjiang. The anxiety that Hong Kongers may similarly be brought to heel became an important element in the protests of 2014 and 2019–2020. In 2014, Xi introduced a holistic security concept that placed emphasis on Chinese national security.

While Beijing imposed a national security law on Hong Kong in 2020 in the aftermath of massive protests, it does not cover all BL 23 offences, and Article 7 of that law requires Hong Kong to "complete, as early as possible, legislation for safeguarding national security as stipulated in the Basic Law of the Hong Kong Special Administrative Region".

=== Carrie Lam administration ===
After the national security law was imposed, Chief Executive Carrie Lam pledged to conduct as much preparatory work as possible but noted that the administration might not be able to complete the legislation by the end of its current term. In March 2021, the Chinese Communist Party initiated electoral overhaul that plans to ensure only "patriots" may run for office and exclude political opposition. Six months later, Security Secretary Chris Tang said the time had never been so "ripe" to relaunch the bill as the public had witnessed "lawlessness" and acts "endangering national security" in the 2019 protest. Tang also said the bill would focus on countering state-level spying activities, and expressed his confidence that the Article 23 bill will not meet as much resistance as in 2003.

Following the election that saw pro-government members capturing nearly all seats, the new legislature convened the first session in January 2022, during which Carrie Lam confirmed "local legislation" will be drafted that meets Article 23 to outlaw new national security crimes. Tang revealed that the government aims to launch a public consultation by the end of the term of the current administration in late June, and table the draft to the parliament in the second half of the year. However, no significant progress was made, and Carrie Lam announced her intention to stand down without seeking re-election three months later. John Lee, the Chief Secretary, was subsequently endorsed by Xi Jinping's administration to be her successor.

=== John Lee administration ===
Unveiling his manifesto in April 2022, John Lee pledged to enact the Article 23 bill to fulfil the constitutional responsibility of legislation as part of improving governance. After being elected as the Chief Executive by the 1,461-member committee, he said the legislative agenda would be pushed forward "at the right time" and rejected prioritising political reform. His first Policy Address in October did not mention a timeframe for the Article 23 bill.

In July 2023, six months after the post-pandemic reopening of Hong Kong, Lee confirmed the schedule had been formulated and Article 23 bill would be enacted no later than 2024. The government submitted the annual legislative programme to the Legislative Council on 12 January 2024, showing that the "Safeguarding National Security Bill" was slated to be introduced within the 2024 legislative session. Media sources claimed the government's target was to finish all legislative work before the summer recess of the parliament.

== Consultation ==
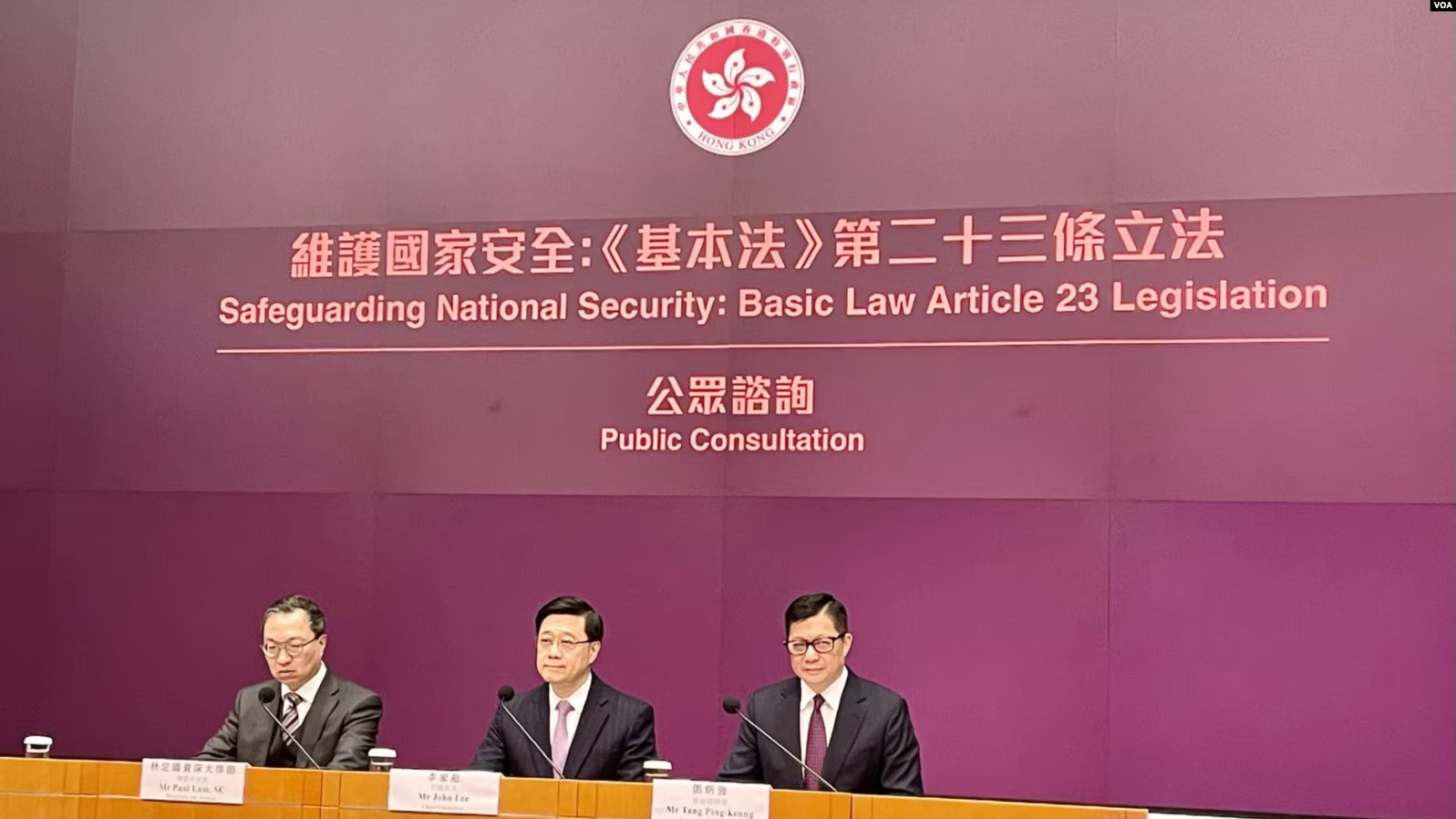
Consultation announced in a press conference joined by, from left to right, justice secretary Paul Lam, John Lee, security secretary Chris Tang

The Government commenced the public consultation for the proposed legislation on 30 January 2024, lasting for four weeks until 28 February. During the last attempt in 2003, the consultation period was three months. John Lee defended the time period as appropriate and stated that the community has reached a consensus on the legislation of Article 23 which should be enacted as soon as possible. Regina Ip, who failed to push for the 2003 bill as Security Secretary, said the long consultation had provoked many negative reports.

BBC reported that much of the public was muted on the legislation, with some dedicated the situation to the chilling effect after the 2020 national security law. Ip, now the convenor of the Executive Council, said other issues such as solid waste charging gathered more public attention.

Describing that the legislative agenda received majority support from the public, the authorities received 13,147 submissions with 98.64% support. Amongst the 0.71% that objected, over 10 were from overseas anti-China organisations or absconders as the authorities claimed.

On 5 March the Legislative Council announced a joint meeting of the Article 23 subcommittee and two panels would be held tomorrow, prompting MPs who were attending the annual Two Sessions congress meeting in Beijing to rush back to Hong Kong, while John Lee also ended his Beijing trip a day earlier than expected. Sources quoted by the media said the "unusual" arrangement was made as the government intended to enact the legislation by National Security Education Day on 15 April.

== Provisions ==
=== Criminal offences ===
National Security offences in Hong Kong
Law on Safeguarding National Security	Safeguarding National Security Ordinance	Pre-existing ordinances
Secession	Treason	Crimes Ordinance
Subversion	Insurrection	Crimes Ordinance
Collusion with external elements	Incitement to Mutiny, Disaffection	Crimes Ordinance
Terrorist Activities	Sedition	Crimes Ordinance
	Acquisition, Possession, Disclosure of state secrets	Official Secret Ordinance
	Espionage	
Sabotage
External interference
	Participation in organizations endangering security	Societies Ordinance

Bold items indicates life imprisonment as maximum penalty.

The bill includes five areas of national security crimes: treason, insurrection and incitement to mutiny, theft of state secrets and espionage, sabotage, and external interference. Treason, insurrection and sabotage, targeting acts that endanger the sovereignty of China and collusion with foreign forces in damaging public infrastructure may face up to life imprisonment. Some offences carry higher penalties if defendants colluded with an external force, such as providing unlawful drilling.

Penalty for sedition, the colonial-era offence criticised as a catch-all offence, is proposed to increase to a maximum 10-year imprisonment, up from the current 2-year. It also includes the new intention to cause hatred amongst different classes of residents of Hong Kong and China. The bill also specifies that public disorder or violence is not the threshold for conviction, a day after the Court of Appeal delivered a similar judgement. Officials also explained the public will need a "reasonable defence" to keep Apple Daily and other seditious publications at home, which carries a maximum penalty of three years.

In accordance with Article 23, foreign political bodies are covered in the bill as well. The Secretary for Security is empowered to prohibit operations of an organisation accused of external interference with bodies including foreign governments and political parties, as well as international organisations, on the basis of national security, if such organisations communicated with external force intended to cause interference. The bill also proposes criminalising making false statements implied to obscure an intent to cause interference with an external force, or to cause "mental pressure". Interfering with government, court, legislative, or electoral affairs by "improper means" through collaboration with external forces comes with a maximum sentence of 14 years in prison. Concerns arose before consultation whether international advocacy groups such as Greenpeace and Amnesty International could be banned in Hong Kong.

A person charged under three types of state secrets offences, i.e., unlawful acquisition, unlawful possession and unlawful disclosure, may invoke the defence that they had made "a specified disclosure", where the purpose of the disclosure is to reveal a threat to public order, safety, or health; that the government is not functioning lawfully; and where the "public interest served by making the disclosure manifestly outweighs the public interest served by not making the disclosure". Such provisions were not mentioned in the original legislative agenda, and were introduced after the authorities accepted suggestions from the pro-Beijing members.

=== Judicial procedures ===
Under the current rules, anyone arrested cannot be held for longer than 48 hours, after which the person must be released or charged. Authorities sought to extend the period a suspect can be held without charge to 14 days, if such application is made within the initial 48-hour detention period and the magistrate is satisfied that the investigation cannot reasonably be completed. Police may apply for a court warrant to stop a suspect from consulting a lawyer if it is believed that their doing so will endanger national security, and defendants can be restricted from meeting specific lawyers as well.

For jailed national security offenders, unless the prison service was satisfied that their parole would not "be contrary to the interest of national security", existing early release schemes may not apply to the offenders. Under the Release under Supervision Scheme and the Pre-release Employment Scheme, an inmate who is jailed for more than three years can apply for early release after serving at least half or 20 months of their sentence. The restriction will apply to the current offenders, including Tong Ying-kit, the first jailed national security prisoner. Even after serving the jail terms, the national security prisoners would be barred to run in elections for life.

Targeting the exiled activists, the bill proposed enabling the authorities to impose a series of restrictions on the wanted individual, such as annulling their Hong Kong passport, prohibiting anyone from providing them with funds, suspending their professional qualifications, and removing their directorship of a company.

=== Extraterritoriality ===
Similar to the 2020 national security law, some offences are to be applicable worldwide with extraterritoriality, even committed outside Hong Kong. Anyone, regardless of nationality, could be charged for: Sabotage; Endangering national security in relation to computers or electronic systems; Unlawful disclosure of state secrets or apparent confidential information.^{s.38,46,49,55}

Hong Kong residents, regardless of nationality, or organisations formed or registered or has business in Hong Kong could be charged for: Sedition; Espionage; Unlawful acquisition or possession of state secrets; Possession of inciting documents with intent to commit offence; Assisting members of Chinese armed force to abandon duties; Inciting disaffection of public officers, or personnel of Chinese offices in Hong Kong.^{s.27,38}

Hong Kong residents who are Chinese citizens, Hong Kong permanent residents, or organisations formed or registered or has business in Hong Kong could be charged for: Treason; Unlawful drilling; Insurrection; Inciting mutiny; External interference; Participating in or supporting or accepting advantages offered by external intelligence organizations.^{s.14,16,55}

The US raised concerns that the law can be applied extraterritorially to "intimidate" and restrict the free speech of US residents, while undermine China's international commitments and the One Country, Two Systems framework. Hong Kong government said it "strongly disapproved" the concerns, and the "proportionate" extraterritorial effect was fully in line with international common practice, or else it would amount to condoning activities threatening national security.

== Debate ==
=== First reading ===
As the government insisted on a speedy and fast-track debate, the Executive Council convened a special meeting on 7 March for consideration of the Safeguarding National Security Bill. Immediately after the urge from John Lee, President of the Legislative Council Andrew Leung also decided to convene an off-schedule special meeting on the next day solely for the bill, soon after it was expected to be revealed to the public. A senior legislator said it is uncommon for a bill to be gazetted and first read on the same day. Leung said passing the bill is a historical mission.

=== Bill Committee ===
After the bill was read the first time in the morning on 8 March, it was then sent to the bill committee in the afternoon for consideration. The committee discussed the new legislation in more than 40 hours of meetings spanning seven days, including rare weekend sessions.

As pro-Beijing members described the bill as too lenient, the government presented amendments to the bill on the seventh day of deliberation, effectively making the bill tougher than its original draft. They include scrapping a six-month wait until authorities can designate a wanted individual as an absconder, which allows authorities to levy sanctions any time after an arrest warrant is issued. Provisions that empower the Chief Executive to consult the Executive Council and make subsidiary legislation for "safeguarding national security" were added as well to "deal with unforeseen circumstances", with the maximum penalty set at 7-year imprisonment. A new clause was added specifying that the legislation also applies to "shadow organisations” that may consist of members of the organisation prohibited for endangering national security. The court may also grant anonymity orders to anyone linked to national security cases.

Just 15 hours after presenting the amendments, 15 members of the bill committee unanimously approved moving the bill to the next stage.

=== Second reading ===
A day after the bill committee finished the work, the authorities requested the support from the House Committee to waive rules of a ten-day notice from officials before the second reading can resume. Leung later authorized the waiver in order to complete the legislation under "the sooner, the better" principle to plug the national security loophole. He also said there had been sufficient public discussion on the legislation, and denied there was a "deadline" to pass.

On 18 March, the Legislative Council announced it has agreed to "set aside all other matters" and convened a full meeting at 9 a.m. on the next day, a day earlier than the usual session held on every Wednesday. The media had expected the parliament to unanimously approve the bill during the special session.

All 88 lawmakers, except the President, spoke and expressed support in a highly enthusiastic mood during the second reading of the bill, with one, Lam So-wai from Professional Power, even claiming to endorse the legislation wholeheartedly "even at the cost of having her body smashed into pieces". Most of the legislators only address the chamber for around 5 minutes, half of the maximum 10 minutes, after they were reportedly reminded against lengthy speeches. Many recalled the failed attempt in 2003 and the subsequent turmoil, such as the 2014 Umbrella Movement, 2016 Mong Kok unrest, and 2019 anti-extradition protests, and the necessity to grow a new security law to defend the security and oblige the constitutional requirements. Seven members made their support in English as a measure to combat international criticisms, while some China-born legislators spoke in Mandarin.

At around a quarter past four, the chamber cleared the second reading after no members voted against. So Cheung-wing did not raise his hand after apparently falling asleep, while Ma Fung-kwok was also suspected of doing so.

The committee of the whole council then proceeded to discuss and scrutinise the details of the bill and the 91 amendments proposed by the government. All provisions and amendments were unanimously support soon after half past six.

=== Third reading and vote ===
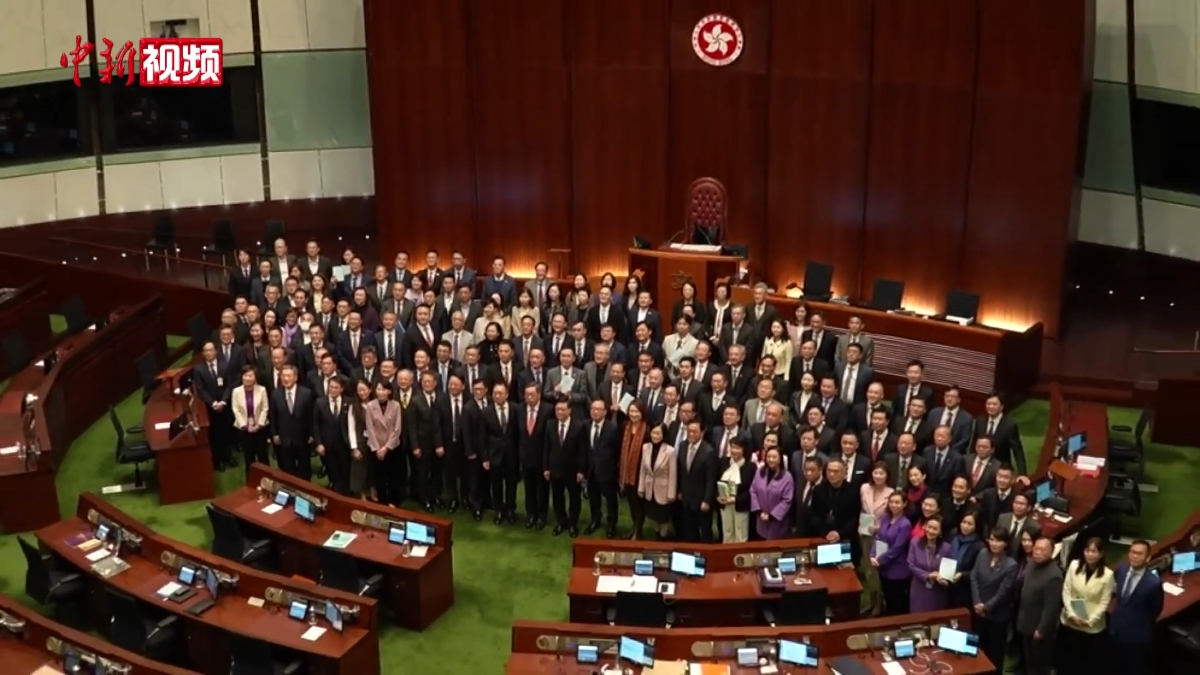
John Lee, Andrew Leung and the Legislative Council members took a group photo after the bill passed.

During the third reading debate, each party or alliance in the legislature fielded a representative to speak in support of the legislation.

At 6.54 p.m., after ten hours of debate, the 89-member Legislative Council (one left vacant) voted on the third and final reading of the bill. All 89 voted for the bill, including President who historically broke the convention and cast his ballot to mark the occasion. Leung said the bill matters the Chinese national security and, with all colleagues expressing support, he is honoured to take part in the "historic mission" and support as well.

In a rare occasion, John Lee entered the chamber to deliver a speech soon after the legislation was enacted.

Today marks a historic moment for Hong Kong. It is a historic moment that Hong Kong has been waiting for 26 years, 8 months and 19 days … It is a proud moment for all of Hong Kong in collectively making glorious history.

Lee added the new law was defensive in nature and would protect the city with a "stronger door and effective lock" against "invaders". The authorities took only 50 days from the launch of a public consultation to writing it into law, including a fast-track 12-day debate in the legislative council. Lee in response said speed was of the essence, because national security threats could catch Hong Kong off guard, and different countries also speedily pass laws to deal with respective security risks.

This bill came into force on 23 March 2024.

== Reaction ==
=== Domestic ===
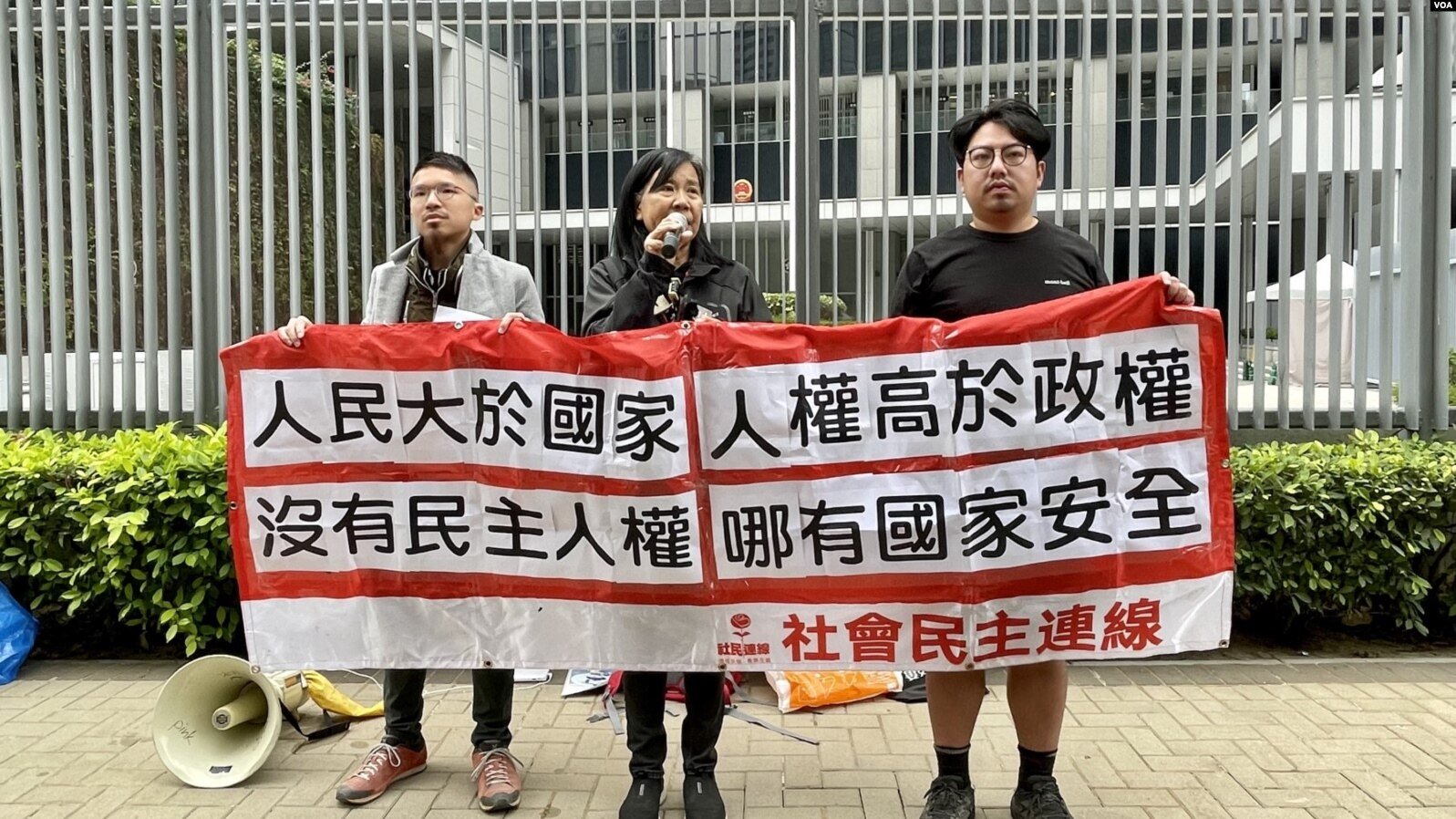
League of Social Democrats protested outside the government headquarters, chanting slogans of "people above the nation, human rights above the regime", "no national security without democracy and human rights".

Pro-democracy camp, following crushes by the security law four years earlier, voiced limited opinion on the legislation as the consultation was largely dominated by the Pro-Beijing voices. During the consultation period, Democratic Party and League of Social Democrats (LSD), two of the few remaining active pro-democracy parties, raised their concerns in the submissions. Democratic Party argued the wording of the bill was overly vague and the low threshold to incriminate others, which could create more "chilling effect" and harming the international reputation of Hong Kong. LSD urged to remove the provisions related to misprision of treason as it could rage Cultural Revolution-like division in the society or even within families, and "treason" might become "thoughtcrime" due to subjective wording. Both parties proposed that requirement to convict sedition and external interference shall be tightened, while LSD went further and demanded to repeal them.

On the penultimate day of the consultation period, LSD held a rare three-men demonstration, with chairwoman Chan Po-ying and two vice-chairmen Yu Wai-pan and Chow Ka-fat, outside the government complex under the watch of a dozen police officers who also stopped and searched them. They chanted slogans including "people above the nation, human rights above the regime" and "no national security without democracy and human rights". The group, who continued to demand universal suffrage, said following the 2020 security law, human rights and freedom suffered setback while civil society was dealt a severe blow. In response, the Democratic Party chairman Lo Kin-hei praised the LSD's protest as "courageous" but advised them to be careful when expressing themselves.

With the whole pro-Beijing camp in uncompromising support of the bill, Martin Liao, who chaired the bills committee, stressed the passing of the legislation is "the right thing to do". He took a defiant tone on the potential sanctions or punitive measures, believing "whatever will come will come". Regina Ip also dismissed the threat of Western sanctions or downgrades against Hong Kong, saying "they will regret it, and we are not daunted by these threats."

=== Chinese government ===
Hong Kong and Macau Affairs Office of the Chinese Government said the passage of the law "once again proved that the wheel of history is rolling forward, the righteous cause is undefeatable, and no reactionary force can stop the 'one country, two systems' from advancing". It also emphasised that the law would not affect Hong Kong's normal business activities and international exchanges. Hong Kong Liaison Office added that Hong Kong can now "move forward without worries or burden, and focus on developing the economy and improving people’s livelihoods". The Legislative Affairs Commission of the Standing Committee of the National People's Congress also hailed the passage of the law.

=== Foreign governments ===
Canada and European Union reportedly issued démarche, the first since 2019 extradition bill during public consultation period. European Union said it expressed "grave concerns over the proposed bill which would further erode Hong Kong's autonomy". Brussels added "the vague definition of state secrets and extraterritoriality, and the consequential offence of external interference could impact EU's office, consulates, nationals and organisations". Canada cited "inaccurate comparisons" made in the consultation document between proposed bill and Canadian security law, and urged Hong Kong authorities to "protect freedom and rights in accordance with Basic Law and international treaties, while to establish independent mechanism to ensure transparency, proportionality, and accountability of the bill".

Australia and the United Kingdom, following a bilateral summit in Adelaide on Friday, decried the law as part of a "systemic erosion" of autonomy, liberty and rights in Hong Kong.

Upon the bill's passage into law, various foreign governments responded over the fast-track deliberation and the vaguely and poorly defined terminology.

United Nations High Commissioner for Human Rights Volker Turk said it is "alarming" that the legislation was rushed through in spite of serious concerns raised about the incompatibility with international human rights law that could criminalize basic freedoms including freedom of expression and assembly. Turk described the lack of meaningful consultation as "a regressive step for the protection of human rights".

European Union said it was concerned about the "potential impact on the rights and freedoms" and the bill had the potential to "significantly" affect the work of the EU's office as well as organisations and companies in Hong Kong, and raised questions about Hong Kong's long-term attractiveness as an international business hub. The US said the new law could potentially "accelerate the closing of Hong Kong’s once open society", and it was analyzing what the potential risk could be to US citizens and other American interests. British Foreign Secretary David Cameron said the new law undermined the 1984 Joint Declaration, and would have far-reaching implications for Hong Kong's rule of law, rights and freedoms, and impact Hong Kong's reputation as an international city.

China defended the law and denounced countries that "smeared" the legislation, stressing the firm determination to oppose external interference in Hong Kong affairs. The Chinese Embassy demanded Britain stop making "groundless accusations".

=== Media ===
The New York Times wrote the law "could have a chilling effect on a wide range of people, including entrepreneurs, civil servants, lawyers, diplomats, journalists and academics, raising questions about Hong Kong’s status as an international city".

As foreign media outlets expressed concern over the law's impact on Hong Kong's freedom, rights, and autonomy, the Hong Kong government defended the law and denounced some of the reports made. Early in January, the government announced establishing "response and refute team", led by Chris Tang, to rebut criticism from "hostile forces".

==== Bloomberg ====
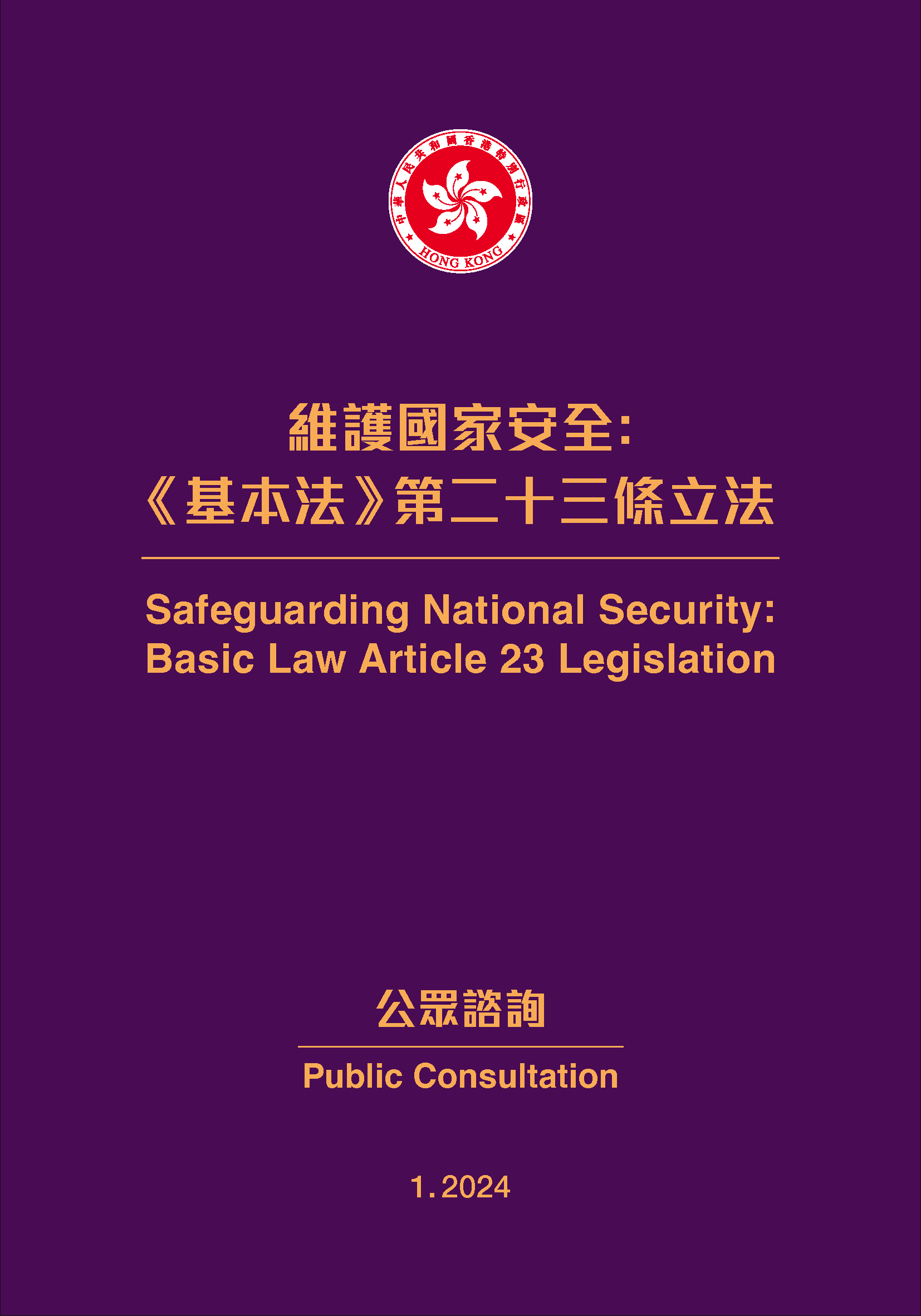
Title page of the public consultation of the bill

After the conclusion of the public consultation, the officials presented the result in a joint meeting at the parliament, highlighting that the legislation received widespread support. Some comments presented in the consultation document suggested a ban on social media including Facebook, YouTube, Telegram and Signal from operating in Hong Kong, which were said to be hotbeds of crime for dissemination of seditious information. Paul Lam, Secretary for Justice, clarified the authorities had no plan to prohibit the social media platforms, after a Bloomberg report stated "HK says Telegram [and Signal] should be prohibited in Article 23 proposal". Hong Kong authorities condemned the report which generated "misunderstanding and panic" about Article 23 legislation. Bloomberg later admitted error and retracted the news article.

The security minister hit out again on Bloomberg over the "Hong Kong's New Security Law is Worryingly Vague" editorial, criticising it as "misleading" and "alarmist". Tang clarified normal businesses would not be found committing crimes related to external forces "unintentionally". The minister added that many other countries implemented similar or even stricter measures on restricting national security defendants as well, and accused the Bloomberg article for holding "double standards".

==== The Times ====
The Times published an article titled "Hongkongers to be jailed for keeping old newspapers", reporting that according to Hong Kong authorities, Hongkongers might be imprisoned for sedition for keeping old copies of Apple Daily, the defunct newspaper that is charged with seditious publication. In the statement the Hong Kong authorities said the report was "extremely misleading" and "completely wrong" intended to generate panic, adding that the prosecution has to prove that the defendant possesses the publication "without reasonable excuse" before conviction.

The report came after Chris Tang was asked in the parliament whether citizens would violate the law if they had copies of the Apple Daily newspaper at home. In response he said if the newspaper was kept for a long time and was unnoticed by the individual and the aim was not to incite, then it could be a reasonable defence. Some suggested this implies it is possible to be jailed for keeping Apple Daily if the defendant is unable to justify the absence of seditious intention.

==== Washington Post ====
Titled "With the new security law, Hong Kong doubles down on repression", the Washington Post's editorial said the end of the public consultation period for the bill was "another sad milestone in Hong Kong's downward trajectory". The editorial also called for the release of defendants in the Apple Daily case and in Hong Kong 47 subversion case, as the prosecution "stretched credulity trying to prove that running in a primary and trying to win a majority of council seats amounted to a crime".

Commissioner's Office of China's Foreign Ministry in Hong Kong said in an open letter to the editorial board that it was "deeply shocked" by the paper's "ignorance and double standard". The Office dismissed the paper's pessimistic forecast and said "well, just relax and take a deep breath". In regards to the criticism of the court cases, the Office said "to your dismay, the evidence exposed during the trial shows that those charged are not as 'innocent' as you thought". Chris Tang also "strongly opposed and condemned" the "misleading and inappropriate remarks", and "neglected" the city's constitutional duty to enact the legislation.

== See also ==
- Hong Kong Basic Law Article 23
- National Security (Legislative Provisions) Bill
- Hong Kong Bill of Rights Ordinance
- Public Order Ordinance
- 2020 Hong Kong national security law
- Macau national security law
- National Security Law of the People's Republic of China
