= National Security (Legislative Provisions) Bill =

Proposed legislation of Hong Kong

Legislative Council of Hong Kong
- Long title: A Bill to amend the Crimes Ordinance, the Official Secrets Ordinance and the Societies Ordinance pursuant to the obligation imposed by Article 23 of the Basic Law of the Hong Kong Special Administrative Region of the People's Republic of China and to provide for related, incidental and consequential amendments.
- Considered by: Legislative Council of Hong Kong

Legislative history
- Introduced by: Secretary for Security Regina Ip
- Introduced: 14 February 2003; 23 years ago
- First reading: 26 February 2003; 23 years ago
- Committee report: Report of the Bills Committee on National Security (Legislative Provisions) Bill

Related legislation
- Crimes Ordinance; Official Secrets Ordinance; Societies Ordinance
- Status: Withdrawn

The National Security (Legislative Provisions) Bill (Chinese: 國家安全（立法條文）條例草案) was a bill proposed by the Government of Hong Kong in 2003. It aimed to amend the Crimes Ordinance, the Official Secrets Ordinance, and the Societies Ordinance, pursuant to the obligation imposed by Article 23 of the Basic Law, and to provide for related, incidental and consequential amendments. The proposed bill was introduced on 14 February 2003. It caused considerable controversy in Hong Kong and a massive demonstration on 1 July. On 6 July, James Tien resigned from the Executive Council. On 5 September 2003, Hong Kong chief executive Tung Chee-hwa announced that the bill had been officially withdrawn.

== Background ==
The Article 23 of the Basic Law (BL 23) states:

The Hong Kong Special Administrative Region shall enact laws on its own to prohibit any act of treason, secession, sedition, subversion against the PRC government, or theft of state secrets, to prohibit foreign political organisations or bodies from conducting political activities in the Region, and to prohibit political organisations or bodies of the Region from establishing ties with foreign political organisations or bodies.

Before 1997, the government of British Hong Kong introduced the Crimes (Amendment)(No.2) Bill 1996 in an attempt to concretize the concepts of "subversion" and secession" by confining them to actual violent conduct but it failed as it was strongly opposed by the PRC government. The failure of this 1996 bill thus left a vacuum in the present legislation.

The government of the Hong Kong Special Administrative Region (HKSAR) had delayed the matter and had successfully warded off any suggestion to enact a law. However the controversy over Article 23 began in mid-2002 when Qian Qichen, Vice Premier of the State Council, expressed the PRC government's desire for Hong Kong to pass the required legislation quickly. This prompted the Chief Executive of Hong Kong Tung Chee-hwa to begin the process of drafting the said legislation. On 24 September 2002, the HKSAR government unveiled its Consultation Document on Proposals to Implement Article 23 of the Basic Law. Even before the publication of the consultation document, a number of groups such as the Hong Kong Bar Association and the Hong Kong Journalists Association had expressed grave concerns in July 2002 about the possible implementation of the Article 23. The three-month consultation ended in December after a demonstration on 15 December 2002 which drew almost 60,000 people against the proposal. In response, the government amended the proposal by giving several major "concessions" on the substance, but rejected the call for a white paper.

== Content ==
The National Security (Legislative Provisions) Bill was introduced to the Legislative Council on 26 February 2003 after a blue bill was published in the Gazette on 14 February. The bill was to provide for the following:

1. the offences of treason, subversion, secession and sedition;
2. the prohibition of unauthorized disclosure of certain official information;
3. the proscription of certain organizations if it is necessary in the interests of national security and is proportionate for such purpose;
4. the power of entry, search, seizure, detention and removal by the police without warrant for the investigation of treason, subversion, secession, sedition and handling seditious publication;
5. the election of trial by jury in respect of sedition by inciting violent public disorder, handling seditious publication and any of the offences of unlawful disclosure;
6. the removal of existing time limit for prosecution of offences; and
7. related, incidental and consequential amendments.

50 out of the total 60 Legislative Council members joined the Bills Committee. Chaired by Ip Kwok-him of the Democratic Alliance for the Betterment of Hong Kong (DAB) and his deputy Ambrose Lau of the Hong Kong Progressive Alliance (HKPA), the committee oversaw the fierce battle between the pro-Beijing and pro-democracy members. During the Bills Committee's deliberations on the bill, the government agreed to some amendments, but the critics said they were insufficient and the government's timetable of passing the bill in the Legislative Council did not allow sufficient time for deliberation.

== Positions ==
Concern with the legislation arose because of the authoritarian nature of the PRC government: the bill would invoke concepts of treason against the PRC government in certain circumstances. Critics claimed that the legislation would erode freedom of speech. Suspicions were exacerbated by the refusal of the HKSAR government to issue a white paper on the legislation, causing groups such as Amnesty International to declare that it had "grave concerns about the proposals in the government's consultation document and the lack of a draft white paper which means that the public still do not know how the legislation will actually be worded." The government would be required to issue a blue paper containing the draft legislation when it presented the new bill to the Legislative Council, but this would leave no time for the public to voice its concerns, and the government might use its unelected majority in Legco to rush the bill through.

=== Concerns ===
In the consultation document of Article 23 enactment, the following issues caused concern:

- Any branch of an organization that is part of an organization banned by the central government of the PRC under state security reasons can be banned in Hong Kong at any time, and the Hong Kong government does not have to conduct any independent investigation. This provision was of particular concern because the PRC government did not have a general legal mechanism for defining a banned organization or political dissidents. One consequence of this is that it would become somewhat harder to prosecute regular members of an organization disliked by the PRC government, as it would require the PRC government to try to find a crime which the individual had committed.
- The concepts of government and country are confused and exchangeable in the proposed document. In a democratic country, citizens are empowered with the right to monitor and check the government. The proposed enactment of Article 23 makes opposing the government the same as opposing the country.
- In the proposed enactment, police are allowed to enter residential buildings and arrest people at any time without court warrants or evidence.
- Any speech deemed as instigative can be regarded as illegal, including oral, written and electronic forms; it is a crime both to express, and to hear such speech and fail to report it.
- Permanent residents of Hong Kong must comply with this law, regardless of where they reside. People who are in Hong Kong are also subject to Article 23, regardless of nationality, including people who visit or transit through Hong Kong. Violations of Article 23 could result in a life term in prison.

=== Debate ===
Supporters of the legislation, the most vocal of which is perhaps Hong Kong's Secretary for Security Regina Ip, viewed the introduction of the law as being quite ordinary and natural:

"Firstly, all countries have laws to protect national security but, in Hong Kong, the Mainland's national laws on this subject do not apply. It has been left up to the Hong Kong SAR Government to enact laws 'on its own'. This in itself shows a great measure of trust in Hong Kong people by the Central Government authorities. We are not introducing Mainland law into Hong Kong. We are developing our own approach. Can you imagine California or Connecticut enacting their own laws against treasonous acts or foreign organizations bent on the overthrow of the US Government?"

"Secondly, we have a constitutional and legal obligation, under our Basic Law, to enact such laws. By doing so, we fulfil our role to implement One country, two systems. Five years after reunification, it is time to move ahead on a matter that is regarded as extremely important by our sovereign. By doing so, we will remove once and for all the uncertainties that have cropped up from time to time over the past five years as to when, and in what form, Article 23 will be implemented."

"We also have a moral duty, as a Special Administrative Region of the PRC, to protect the security and sovereignty of our country. Why should Hong Kong people be under any less obligation to do so, or indeed feel uncomfortable in doing so, compared to citizens in other countries?"

Ip has been criticised by the press and religious groups for her zealousness in pursuing the implementation of the legislation. Ip asserted that because the ordinary people would not "understand the legal language", there was no point in consulting them on it.

Bob Allcock, the Solicitor General of Hong Kong, was perceived as more even-handed in his approach and frequently argued that the laws proposed by the government are less restrictive than the colonial era laws that they were intended to replace:

"Contrary to what some have alleged, the bill to implement Article 23 of the Basic Law does not provide for 'secret trials'. Any criminal prosecution under the proposed new laws would be subject to normal trial procedures. In addition, if anyone were charged with one of the serious offences against national security, he or she would have the right to trial by jury."

"The proposed new offence of treason will be narrower than the existing offence. It will therefore impose no new restrictions on freedom of speech. The only situations in which words could amount to treason under the proposals would be where the words instigate a foreigner to invade the PRC or assist a public enemy at war with the PRC. For example, if the PRC is at war with a foreign country, and a Hong Kong permanent resident broadcasts propaganda for the enemy, he may be convicted for assisting that enemy."

Alcock also pointed out that under the new laws, a banned organization can appeal the ban to the judiciary, a right not available under the previous laws.

In response, opponents of the bill including Martin Lee have argued that a potentially repressive bill is more acceptable in a system of parliamentary democracy and that under British rule, the potential impact of security laws was minimised by the fact that political leaders would suffer political damage if they attempted to enforce these laws. The argument is that in the case where Hong Kong becomes authoritarian, there are fewer restrictions which prevent them drafting bad laws.

In response to the argument that Article 23 legislation is constitutionally required, opponents to the government bill point out that the Basic Law does not set up a specific time for passage of the legislation, and that the Basic Law also constitutionally requires that the HK government work toward a system of universal suffrage. Opponents argue that because both goals do not have time limits, there is no reason to implement Article 23 legislation before universal suffrage. Core group of lawyers and legal academics, called the Article 23 Concern Group, led the massive protests against the legislation, highlighting in a series of nine pamphlets the various concerns raise in the community, with special attention to free speech concerns.

Another argument against Article 23 laws as drafted by the HKSAR government has been given by John Kamm, who argued that the mechanism for banning organizations would have the effect of requiring that the PRC government be more repressive outside of Hong Kong. His argument is that since 1997, the PRC government has not had the legal concept of banning an organization on national security grounds, and that political repression in the PRC takes the form of government criminal charges against individual acts. He argued that the HK government's draft of Article 23 law requires the PRC to set up a system of banning organizations on national security grounds and this would greatly hurt members of politically sensitive organizations who are not leaders. He pointed out that the PRC currently typically imprisons only the leadership of an organization, and "merely" harass lower-level members because their behavior does not rise to the level of criminal charges. By passing Article 23 law, Hong Kong will require the PRC government to develop the legal mechanisms to punish all members of a banned political organization, a power it now only had with respect to religious organizations such as Falun gong and students who were involved in the Tiananmen Square protests of 1989. For example, Macau, which has implemented the national security legislation, identical to the article proposed for Hong Kong, in June 2009 refused transit to mainland China by a Tiananmen student leader Wu'er Kaixi.

Finally, at a time when Hong Kong's economy-inextricably linked to its property index-was in the doldrums, and SARS had had a major impact on life in the HKSAR region, the government's focus on Article 23 had been perceived as inappropriate, especially since Hong Kong has been a stable place since the 1997 handover from the United Kingdom to the PRC, and that therefore revision of colonial anti-subversion laws was not required.

Journalists in particular are concerned about the new law, especially with respect to journalistic criticism of the PRC government and its complex relationship with Taiwan and Tibet, or other matters arising from the possession of official documents.

Outspoken Roman Catholic Bishop Joseph Cardinal Zen has been a key figure in the debate over the legislation: on 15 May 2003 he instructed his church members to resist the introduction of the legislation. But his speech was criticized by some pro-PRC political commentators in Hong Kong, saying that the Church should not be involved in political matters.

The normally neutral Hong Kong Bar Association also stepped into the fray: Bar Association chairman Alan Leong has publicly said: "The more you read into this document, the more anxious and concerned you get. There are some glaring ambiguities".

Other organisations which have spoken out against the proposal include the Hong Kong Journalists Association, Hong Kong Confederation of Trade Unions, the International Confederation of Free Trade Unions, the Foreign Correspondents' Club and the Faculty of Law at the University of Hong Kong. Members of the European Parliament, and officials of the United States Department of State, the United Kingdom, Canada, Australia, and New Zealand have expressed concerns about the Article 23 legislation.

Some banks in Hong Kong were reported to be considering relocation if the proposed Article 23 was passed, out of the fear that the laws would restrict the free flow of information. On 7 December 2002, it was reported in the press that ten foreign banks had told the government privately that the introduction of Article 23 would have disastrous consequences for Hong Kong, threatening its demise as Asia's financial capital.

== July 1 demonstration and downfall ==
After the SARS outbreak in early 2003 drew some attention away from the bill, the pro-democracy camp, especially led by the Article 23 Concern Group, mobilised the public to oppose the bill after Hong Kong began to recover from the SARS crisis in June. On 1 July 2003, the sixth anniversary of the establishment of the HKSAR, more than a half million Hong Kong residents took to the streets to protest the proceedings regarding the bill, as well as to air other grievances against the administration of Chief Executive Tung Chee-hwa.

After the huge turnout on 1 July, the pro-democrats called for protesters to rally around the Legislative Council building on 9 July if the proceedings on the bill were to continue on that day. In the evening of 6 July, Liberal Party chairman James Tien decided to withdraw from the "governing coalition" by resigning from the Executive Council in protest against Tung's decision to adhere to the 9 July deadline. Knowing that the bill would not be passed without the Liberal Party, the SAR government finally decided to postpone the bill. On 17 July 2003, Chief Executive Tung Chee-hwa announced that the government would reopen public consultation on the bill to ensure its content would receive broad public support before it is passed into law.

== Timeline ==
- 15 December 2002 - approximately 65,000 people demonstrated against the legislation.
- 24 December 2002 - 190,000 people had signed petitions against the proposed enactment of Article 23.
- 1 July 2003 - an estimated 350,000 - 700,000 people (out of the total population of 6,730,800) demonstrated against Article 23 against the failing economy, the handling of the SARS epidemic and Tung Chee Hwa and Regina Ip. To some degree the march was also against Anthony Leung for a car tax scandal earlier that year. The march started from Victoria Park, Causeway Bay to Central Government Offices in Central. The generally accepted claims of marchers is 500,000. The only protest in Hong Kong larger than this was the one contemporarily supporting the 1989 Tiananmen Square protests.
- The Democratic Alliance for the Betterment of Hong Kong (DAB), the larger pro-Beijing party, had on that day booked a few of the park's football pitches for a carnival with a comparably meager number of participants. The rest of the park and the surrounding area was packed with people, literally shoulder to shoulder. Traffic along the north of Hong Kong Island (around the CBD area) was effectively paralysed. The MTR was forced to stop operating between Central and Tin Hau station in fear of people not clearing from the stations. A number of demonstrators were still waiting at Victoria Park to start as the first group of people arrived at the government headquarters. The entire march started at 3pm. Some religious groups arrived earlier for a pre-march prayer session. At about 9 to 10pm, the event made news headlines, except in pro-Beijing newspapers.
- In response to the demonstration, two of the pro-government parties in the Legislative Council expressed reservations about the bill, and informal polls of the Legislative Council delegates suggested that the ability of the government to pass the bill was in doubt.
- 5 July 2003 - Tung Chee-hwa announced a modified security law, which would remove the ability of the police to conduct warrantless searches, reduce the ability of the government to ban organizations, and include a "public interest" defense for publishing state secrets. However, the public doubt that such "public interest" defense may not fully protect journalists because whether it is actually a kind of "public interest" is not defined by the public. The Opposition asked the public to surround the Legislative Council building on 9 July.
- 6 July 2003 - Tung announced that the second reading of the Law was to be postponed after James Tien of the Liberal Party announced that he was resigning from the Executive Council and would have his party members vote for a postponement. As a result, the government would have insufficient votes to pass the law.
- 7 July 2003 - Donald Tsang announced that there was no specific timetable for introducing the bill. In addition the DAB announced that it was reconsidering its participation in the government.
- 9 July 2003 - While the bill was postponed indefinitely, 50,000 people surrounded the Legislative Council at night of 9 July. In response, Philip Wong Yu-hong, a pro-government legislator gave the public the middle finger gesture.
- 16 July 2003 - Regina Ip resigned her position as Secretary for Security citing "personal reasons", although political commentators attributed the resignation to the protests over the Article 23 legislation. Her resignation occurred the same day as that of the Financial Secretary Antony Leung.
- Throughout the week Beijing remained mostly quiet. News of the demonstration on 1 July was noticeably absent from the Chinese-language versions of China's state media outlets such as the People's Daily and Xinhua Press Agency; however, there has been reporting on the demonstration's political aftermath. Although it hinted on 5 July 2003 that it would like to see the bill passed quickly, it has not made any formal statements to that effect.
- 19 July 2003 - Communist Party general secretary Hu Jintao was quoted by Chinese media as stating that: "The Central Government is very concerned with the situation in Hong Kong... Only by maintaining Hong Kong's social stability, can a good commercial environment be safeguarded and can Hong Kong's advantages as an international finance, trade and transport center be maintained."
- 20 July 2003 - General secretary Hu had received Tung in Beijing with a ceremony. Normally the ceremonial practice is reserved for visiting heads of state. This is perceived as a face-saving gesture for Tung. Hu emphasized that Hong Kong needed to pass Article 23 legislation.
- 23 July 2003 - British Prime Minister Tony Blair spoke at a British Chamber of Commerce luncheon in Hong Kong, commending the Sino-British Joint Declaration as being responsible for the peaceful nature of the demonstrations against the Article 23 legislation. He emphasized the demonstrations and the peaceful response were evidence of the stability of China overall under the One country, two systems policy.
- Some political analysts, particularly in Taiwanese newspapers, have speculated that the moderate approach that the Central Government has presented toward Hong Kong bears the imprint of more reformist thinking in the new fourth generation of leadership led by paramount leader Hu Jintao and premier Wen Jiabao. It has also been suggested that a major influence on Beijing's reaction to the demonstrations is the strong desire to put on a good face before the presidential election in Taiwan in March 2004 and generally make Taiwanese public opinion more amenable to the cause of Chinese unification.
- 5 September 2003 - the Chief Executive of Hong Kong announced that Article 23 legislation would be withdrawn, that it would be reintroduced only after popular consultations, and that there was no timetable for its reintroduction.

== See also ==
- Human rights in Hong Kong
- 2019 Hong Kong extradition bill
- 2020 Hong Kong national security law
- Safeguarding National Security Ordinance
