= 2019 Hong Kong extradition bill =

Proposed legislation of Hong Kong

Fugitive Offenders and Mutual Legal Assistance in Criminal Matters Legislation (Amendment) Bill 2019

Legislative Council of Hong Kong
- Long title: A Bill to amend the Fugitive Offenders Ordinance so that the Ordinance applies to special surrender arrangements once they are made between Hong Kong and any other place in relation to particular circumstances not covered by surrender arrangements of a general nature; to provide that in relation to special surrender arrangements, the scope of the offences covered for a surrender from Hong Kong is limited to 37 items of offences, on the basis of their existing descriptions in the Ordinance only, that currently apply in relation to surrender arrangements of a general nature; and to provide that documents authenticated in accordance with surrender arrangements that are prescribed arrangements are deemed as duly authenticated; to amend the Mutual Legal Assistance in Criminal Matters Ordinance so that the Ordinance applies to requests for assistance between Hong Kong and any other place; and to provide that a request for assistance in a criminal matter covered by bilateral arrangements for mutual legal assistance made between Hong Kong and any other place that are prescribed arrangements may only be made pursuant to the arrangements.
- Considered by: Legislative Council of Hong Kong

Legislative history
- Introduced by: Secretary for Security John Lee
- Introduced: 29 March 2019
- First reading: 3 April 2019

Amends
- Fugitive Offenders Ordinance; Mutual Legal Assistance in Criminal Matters Ordinance
- Status: Withdrawn

The Fugitive Offenders and Mutual Legal Assistance in Criminal Matters Legislation (Amendment) Bill 2019 (Chinese: 2019年逃犯及刑事事宜相互法律協助法例（修訂）條例草案) was a proposed bill regarding extradition to amend the Fugitive Offenders Ordinance (Cap. 503) in relation to special surrender arrangements and the Mutual Legal Assistance in Criminal Matters Ordinance (Cap. 525) so that arrangements for mutual legal assistance can be made between Hong Kong and any place outside Hong Kong. The bill was proposed by the Hong Kong government in February 2019 to establish a mechanism for transfers of fugitives not only for Taiwan, but also for Mainland China and Macau, which are currently excluded in the existing laws.

The introduction of the bill caused widespread criticism domestically and abroad from the legal profession, journalist organisations, business groups, and foreign governments fearing the erosion of Hong Kong's legal system and its built-in safeguards, as well as damage to Hong Kong's business climate. Largely, this fear is attributed to China's newfound ability through this bill to arrest voices of political dissent in Hong Kong. There have been enormous city-wide protests against the bill in Hong Kong and other cities abroad. On 9 June, protesters estimated to number from hundreds of thousands to more than a million marched in the streets and called for Chief Executive Carrie Lam to step down. On 15 June, Lam announced she would 'suspend' the proposed bill. Ongoing protests called for a complete withdrawal of the bill and subsequently the implementation of universal suffrage, which is promised in the Basic Law. On 4 September, after 13 weeks of protests, Lam officially promised to withdraw the bill upon the resumption of the legislative session from its summer recess. On 23 October, Secretary for Security John Lee announced the government's formal withdrawal of the bill.

== Background ==
In early 2018, 19-year-old Hong Kong resident Chan Tong-kai murdered his pregnant girlfriend Poon Hiu-wing in Taiwan, then returned to Hong Kong. Chan admitted to Hong Kong police that he killed Poon, but the police were unable to charge him for murder or extradite him to Taiwan because no agreement is in place. The two ordinances in Hong Kong, the Fugitive Offenders Ordinance and Mutual Legal Assistance in Criminal Matters Ordinance, were not applicable to the requests for surrender of fugitive offenders and mutual legal assistance between Hong Kong and Taiwan. The pro-Beijing flagship party Democratic Alliance for the Betterment and Progress of Hong Kong (DAB) chairwoman Starry Lee and legislator Holden Chow pushed for a change to the extradition law in 2019 using the murder case as rationale. In February 2019, the government proposed changes to fugitive laws, establishing a mechanism for case-by-case transfers of fugitives by the Hong Kong Chief Executive to any jurisdiction with which the city lacks a formal extradition treaty, which it claimed would close the "legal loophole". Chen Zhimin, Zhang Xiaoming, and Han Zheng of the PRC publicly supported the change and stated that 300 fugitives were living in Hong Kong. Beijing's involvement in the proposed bill caused great concerns in Hong Kong.

== Provisions ==
The key provisions of the bill, as originally tabled, are as follows:
In the Fugitive Offenders Ordinance (FOO) (Cap. 503):

1. To differentiate case-based surrender arrangements (to be defined as "special surrender arrangements" in the proposal) from general long-term surrender arrangements;
2. To stipulate that special surrender arrangements will be applicable to Hong Kong and any place outside Hong Kong, and they will only be considered if there are no applicable long-term surrender arrangements;
3. To specify that special surrender arrangements will cover 37 of the 46 items of offences based on their existing description in Schedule 1 of the FOO, and the offences are punishable with imprisonment for more than three years (later adjusted to seven years) and triable on indictment in Hong Kong. A total of nine items of offences will not be dealt with under the special surrender arrangements;
4. To specify that the procedures in the FOO will apply in relation to special surrender arrangements (except that an alternative mechanism for activating the surrender procedures by a certificate issued by the Chief Executive is provided), which may be subject to further limitations on the circumstances in which the person may be surrendered as specified in the arrangements;
5. To provide that a certificate issued by or under the authority of the Chief Executive is conclusive evidence of there being special surrender arrangements, such that the certificate will serve as a basis to activate the surrender procedures. Such activation does not mean that the fugitive will definitely be surrendered as the request must go through all statutory procedures, including the issuance of an authority to proceed by the Chief Executive, the committal hearing by the court and the eventual making of the surrender order by the Chief Executive. Other procedural safeguards, such as application for habeas corpus, application for discharge in case of delay, and judicial review of the Chief Executive's decision, as provided under the FOO will remain unchanged;

And in the Mutual Legal Assistance in Criminal Matters Ordinance (MLAO) (Cap. 525):

1. To lift the geographical restriction on the scope of application of the Ordinance; and
2. To provide that case-based co-operation premised on the undertaking of reciprocity will be superseded by the long-term MLA arrangements once the latter have been made and become effective.

== Concerns ==
Opposition expressed fears that the city would open itself up to the long arm of mainland Chinese law, putting people from Hong Kong at risk of falling victim to a different legal system. It therefore urged the government to establish an extradition arrangement with Taiwan only, and to sunset the arrangement immediately after the surrender of Chan Tong-kai.

=== Business community ===
The business community also raised concerns over the mainland's court system. The Liberal Party and the Business and Professionals Alliance for Hong Kong (BPA), the two pro-business parties, suggested 15 economic crimes being exempted from the 46 offences covered by the extradition proposal. The American Chamber of Commerce in Hong Kong (AmCham) pointed out that the mainland's "criminal process is plagued by deep flaws, including lack of an independent judiciary, arbitrary detention, lack of fair public trial, lack of access to legal representation and poor prison conditions". The government responded to business chambers' concerns by exempting nine of the economic crimes originally targeted. Only offences punishable by at least three years in prison would trigger the transfer of a fugitive, up from the previously stated one year. Nonetheless, these amendments failed to assuage the business community's concerns. According to the CBC, "[What the] rich business people fear is that the extradition law would destroy the freedoms people and businesses in the territory have grown to expect". Due to the vast power that politicians and officials exert over the mainland legal system, "businesses that want contracts in China to be respected typically include a provision that allows for any disputes to be resolved under Hong Kong law", thereby making Hong Kong a safe and stable haven for multinational corporations. The proposed extradition law would jeopardise Hong Kong's status, with some companies already considering relocation to Singapore. However, the pro-business parties in the Legislative Council later agreed to support the government bill. The situation was similar to the 2017 Chief Executive Election, in which the business sectors were requested to support Carrie Lam under the pressure from the Beijing's Authority.

On 1 April, Hong Kong billionaire tycoon Joseph Lau, former chair of the Chinese Estates Holdings who was convicted of bribery and money laundering in a land deal in Macau in 2014, applied for a judicial review over the bill in court. Lau's lawyers asked the court to make a declaration that the surrender of Lau to Macau would contravene the Hong Kong Bill of Rights. Lau made an abrupt U-turn and dropped his legal challenge on 29 May, saying that he "loves his country and Hong Kong" and that he now supported the legislation.

=== Legal sector ===
The Hong Kong Bar Association released a statement expressing its reservations over the bill, saying that the restriction against any surrender arrangements with mainland China was not a "loophole", but existed in light of the fundamentally different criminal justice system operating in the Mainland, and concerns over the Mainland's track record on the protection of fundamental rights. The association also questioned the accountability of the Chief Executive as the only arbiter of whether a special arrangement was to be concluded with a requesting jurisdiction without the scrutiny of the Legislative Council or without expanding the role of the courts in vetting extradition requests. Twelve current and former chairs of the Bar Association warned that the government's "oft-repeated assertion that the judges will be gatekeepers is misleading", as "the proposed new legislation does not give the Court power to review such matters and the Court would be in no such position to do so."

Three senior judges and twelve leading commercial and criminal lawyers called the bill "one of the starkest challenges to Hong Kong's legal system" in a Reuters report. They feared it would "put [the courts] on a collision course with Beijing", as the limited scope of extradition hearings would leave them little room to manoeuvre. They were concerned that if they tried to stop high-profile suspects from being sent across the border, they would be exposed to criticism and political pressure from Beijing. The judges and lawyers said that under Hong Kong's British-based common law system, extraditions are based on the presumption of a fair trial and humane punishment in the receiving country—a presumption they say China's Communist Party-controlled legal system has not earned.

On 5 June 2019, the Law Society of Hong Kong released an 11-page review of the proposed Cap. 503 (FOO) amendments. It questioned the lack of additional requirements on proof-of-evidence in favour of extradition and the non-admissibility of additional evidence against extradition. It argued that the HK government should not rush to propose the current legislation, and that a comprehensive review of the current extradition system and research on the cross-jurisdiction transfer of fugitives should be done prior to the proposal of such laws. The Law Society recommended a proposal to specifically cover the current Taiwan murder case to be made if the government wanted to transfer the suspect soon. In addition, some members of the Law Society question the necessity of such an amendment in the absence of any major problems with extradition to mainland China or Taiwan since Hong Kong's return to China in 1997.

On another perspective, Grenville Cross, Vice-chairman (Senate) of the International Association of Prosecutors, and previous Director of Public Prosecutions in Hong Kong, has opined that although it is important to respect the rights of suspects, the debate has downplayed the issue of responsibilities of Hong Kong to other jurisdictions in the global combat of crime.

=== Human rights groups ===
On 4 March 2019 Justice Centre Hong Kong provided public comments outlining their concerns with the extradition proposals to the Security Bureau, preempting the Hong Kong business chambers taking an interest. Subsequently, Amnesty International, Hong Kong Human Rights Monitor, and Human Rights Watch declared their opposition to the bill, warning the extradition proposal could be used as a tool to intimidate critics of the Hong Kong or Chinese governments, peaceful activists, and human rights defenders, as well as further exposing those who are extradited to risks of torture or ill-treatment. Along with other journalists unions and independent media outlets, the Hong Kong Journalists Association reported that the amendment would "not only threaten the safety of journalists but also have a chilling effect on the freedom of expression in Hong Kong." Speaking on behalf of the International Rehabilitation Council for Torture Victims, on 3 July 2019 the executive director of Justice Centre Hong Kong delivered a statement at the 21st meeting of the United Nations Human Rights Council in Geneva raising the bill and the disproportionate use of force being used against the resulting protests.

=== Government of Taiwan ===
Although the government of Taiwan had attempted to negotiate directly with the Hong Kong government to work out a special arrangement, the Hong Kong government did not respond. Taipei also stated it would not enter into any extradition agreement with Hong Kong that defined Taiwan as part of the People's Republic of China. It opposed the proposed bill on grounds that Taiwanese citizens would be at greater risk of being extradited to Mainland China. "Without the removal of threats to the personal safety of [Taiwan] nationals going to or living in Hong Kong caused by being extradited to mainland China, we will not agree to the case-by-case transfer proposed by the Hong Kong authorities," said Chiu Chui-cheng, deputy minister of Taiwan's Mainland Affairs Council. He also described the Taipei homicide case as an "excuse" and questioned whether the Hong Kong government's legislation was "politically motivated". He added that Taiwanese people feared to end up like Lee Ming-che, a democracy activist who disappeared on a trip to mainland China and was later jailed for "subverting state power".

=== Colonial-era officials ===
Hong Kong had been a British colony until it was officially handed over to China in 1997. Since then, the city is operating under "one country, two systems". Lam denied that the mainland was intentionally excluded from the extradition laws ahead of the 1997 handover over fears about the mainland's opaque and politically controlled legal system, or that China had agreed to the exclusion. However, the last colonial governor of Hong Kong Chris Patten and then Chief Secretary Anson Chan asserted that Hong Kong and China knew very well that there had to be a firewall between the different legal systems. Patten also warned that the extradition law would be the "worst thing" to happen in Hong Kong since the 1997 handover. Malcolm Rifkind, former British Foreign Secretary who oversaw the final stages of the handover, also denied that the lack of extradition arrangements between Hong Kong and the Mainland was "a loophole". He stated that "negotiators from both China and the UK made a conscious decision to create a clear divide between the two systems so that the rule of law remains robust", and that "lawyers and politicians from across the political spectrum in Hong Kong have proposed multiple other viable solutions which will ensure that Chan faces justice".

=== Online petitions ===
More than 167,000 students, alumni and teachers from all public universities and hundreds of secondary schools in Hong Kong, including St. Francis' Canossian College which Carrie Lam attended, also launched online petitions against the extradition bill in a snowballing campaign. St. Mary's Canossian College and Wah Yan College, Kowloon, which Secretary for Justice Teresa Cheng and Secretary for Security John Lee attended, respectively, also joined the campaign. Even the alumni, students, and teachers at St. Stephen's College, which the victim in the Taiwan homicide case Poon Hiu-wing attended, petitioned against the extradition bill. High Court judge Patrick Li Hon-leung's signature was spotted on a petition signed by nearly 3,000 fellow University of Hong Kong alumni. Li was reprimanded by Chief Justice Geoffrey Ma for expressing a personal opinion on a political issue, and particularly on a legal issue that might come before the courts.

== Legislative Council row ==
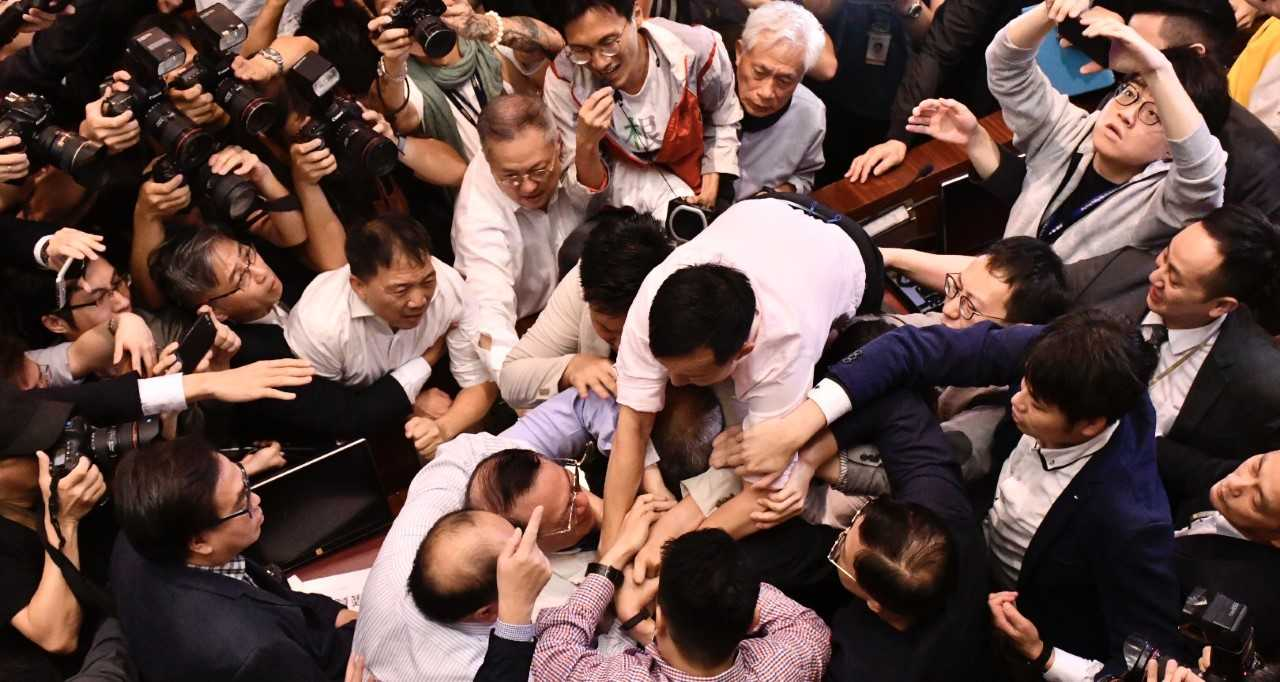
Members of two rival camps pushed and shoved each other in the Bills Committee meeting on 11 May 2019.

The pro-democracy camp, which stringently opposed the law, deployed filibustering tactics by stalling the first two meetings of the Bills Committee and preventing the election of a committee chairman. The House Committee, with a pro-Beijing majority, removed Democratic Party's James To, the most senior member, from his position of presiding member, and replaced him with the third most senior member, pro-Beijing Abraham Shek of the Business and Professionals Alliance for Hong Kong (BPA), thereby bypassing the second most senior member Leung Yiu-chung, a pro-democrat. To claimed that the move was illegitimate, adding that the secretariat had abused its power in issuing the circular without having any formal discussion. The pro-democrats insisted on going ahead with a 6 May meeting as planned which was rescheduled by Shek with only 20 members present. To and Civic Party's Dennis Kwok were elected chair and vice chair of the committee.

Attempts to hold meetings on 11 May descended into chaos as the rival factions pushed and shoved each other along the packed hallway for control of the meeting room. A number of legislators fell to the ground, including Gary Fan who fell from a table before he was sent to hospital. On 14 May, the meeting with two rival presiding chairmen descended into chaos again. Subsequently, pro-Beijing presiding chairman Abraham Shek announced that he could not hold a meeting and asked the House Committee for guidance. On 20 May, Secretary for Security John Lee announced that the government would resume the second reading of the bill in a full Legislative Council meeting on 12 June, bypassing the usual practice of scrutinising the bill in the Bills Committee. After a five-hour meeting on 24 May, the House Committee of the Legislative Council dominated by the pro-Beijing camp passed a motion in support of the government's move to resume the second reading of the bill at a full council meeting on 12 June.

On 9 November, police arrested and charged six pro-democracy lawmakers (while summoning one more lawmaker) for their roles in a 11 May scuffle over the earlier proposed extradition bill. The lawmakers posted bail and were released.

=== No-confidence vote ===
Democratic Party legislator Andrew Wan moved a motion of no-confidence against Carrie Lam on 29 May on the grounds that Lam "blatantly lied" about the extradition bill and misled the public and the international community, as Lam claimed that colonial officials did not deliberately exclude China from extradition laws ahead of the 1997 Handover. It was the first no-confidence vote against her since she took the office in July 2017. Lam survived the vote with the backing of the pro-Beijing majority in the legislature. Chief Secretary Matthew Cheung defended Lam's record and dismissed the motion as "an unnecessary political gesture".

== International escalation ==
=== Beijing weighs in ===
Chinese central government officials weighed in when Director of the Hong Kong and Macau Affairs Office Zhang Xiaoming met a delegation led by Executive Councillor Ronny Tong in Beijing on 15 May in which Zhang showed support of the extradition law. At the same time, a delegation led by former pro-democrat legislator Martin Lee met with U.S. Secretary of State Mike Pompeo who later released statement that he "expressed concern" that the bill could threaten the city's rule of law. On 17 May, Director of the Liaison Office Wang Zhimin met with more than 250 Beijing loyalists in Hong Kong in a two-hour closed-door meeting. He instructed them to fully support the Chief Executive and her administration's push to pass the bill. Vice Premier Han Zheng and chairman of the Chinese People's Political Consultative Conference Wang Yang also spoke in favour of the extradition bill—becoming the highest-ranking Chinese state officials to give their public endorsement. Chief Executive Carrie Lam defended Beijing's involvement, saying that mainland officials offered their views only after the bill controversy was "escalated" by foreign powers, which seized an opportunity to attack the mainland's legal system and human rights record. It was escalated to the level of "one country, two systems" and the constitutionality concerning the Basic Law.

=== Foreign pressure ===
On 24 May, Chief Secretary Matthew Cheung held a special meeting involving 100 officials including principal officials, permanent secretaries and their deputies ostensibly to "bring them up to speed on the justification for the extradition law". Meanwhile, 11 European Union representatives met with Carrie Lam and then issued a démarche to formally protest against the bill. Also on 24 May, eight commissioners from the U.S. Congressional-Executive Commission on China (CECC), Marco Rubio, Tom Cotton, Steve Daines from the U.S. Senate, as well as James McGovern, Ben McAdams, Christopher Smith, Thomas Suozzi and Brian Mast from the U.S. House of Representatives wrote to Chief Executive Carrie Lam asking that the bill be "withdrawn from consideration", stating that "the proposed legislation would irreparably damage Hong Kong's cherished autonomy and protections for human rights by allowing the Chinese government to request extradition of business persons, journalists, rights advocates, and political activists residing in Hong Kong." The commissioners added that the bill could "negatively impact the unique relationship between the U.S. and Hong Kong"—referring to the longstanding U.S. policy of giving the city preferential treatment over mainland China based on the United States–Hong Kong Policy Act.

The UK-based Hong Kong Watch also issued a petition on 29 May signed by 15 parliamentarians from various countries against the extradition bill. Signatories included Member of the House of Lords David Alton, Liberal Democrat Chief Whip of the House of Commons Alistair Carmichael, Leader of the Alliance 90/The Greens in the Bundestag Katrin Göring-Eckardt, Deputy Shadow Minister for Foreign Affairs in the Canadian Parliament Garnett Genuis, Member of the Parliament of Malaysia and Chairman of the ASEAN Parliamentarians for Human Rights Charles Santiago, Member of the European Parliament from Austria Josef Weidenholzer, seven U.S. Senators and one U.S. Representative.

The American Chamber of Commerce in Hong Kong (AmCham) issued a statement on 30 May, questioning the government's decision to push the bill through. AmCham also sent Matthew Cheung eight questions related to the bill following Cheung meeting with the foreign chambers of commerce on the previous day, pressing the government on how it planned to address concerns from foreign diplomats in Hong Kong, and how it would ensure that the requesting jurisdictions could guarantee a fair trial.

On 30 May, a joint statement was issued by British Foreign Secretary Jeremy Hunt and Canadian Minister of Foreign Affairs Chrystia Freeland to urge Hong Kong to ensure the new law was in-keeping with the city's autonomy. "We are concerned about the potential effect of these proposals on the large number of UK and Canadian citizens in Hong Kong, on business confidence and on Hong Kong's international reputation. Furthermore, we believe that there is a risk that the proposals could impact negatively on the rights and freedoms set down in the Sino-British Joint Declaration".

On 13 August, Andrew Scheer, leader of the Conservative Party of Canada and of the Official Opposition since 2017, shared the statement "As Beijing amasses troops at the Hong Kong border, now is the time for everyone committed to democracy, freedom, human rights, and the rule of law to stand with the people of Hong Kong, including the 300,000 ex-pat Canadians. Now, and in the coming days, we are all Hong Kongers:" on social media outlets.

== Government amendments to the bill ==
On 30 May, Secretary for Security John Lee rolled out six new measures to limit the scope of extraditable crimes and raise the bar to those punishable by the sentence of three years to seven years or above—a key demand from the Hong Kong General Chamber of Commerce (HKGCC). Only requests from top judicial bodies of a requesting jurisdiction, namely the Supreme People's Procuratorate and Supreme People's Court in Mainland China, may be considered. Lee's announcement came hours after a group of 39 pro-Beijing legislators called for the bill to be amended. Their two demands—raising the threshold on extraditable crimes and allowing only extradition requests from the mainland's top authority—were both accepted by the government.

The government promulgated on 30 May the provision of "additional safeguards" in the following three aspects:

1. limiting the application of special surrender arrangements to the most serious offences only by raising the threshold requirement for applicable offences from imprisonment for more than three years to seven years or above;
2. including safeguards that are in line with common human rights protection in the activation of special surrender arrangements, such as presumption of innocence, open trial, legal representation, right to cross-examine witnesses, no coerced confession, right to appeal, etc.; and the requesting party must guarantee that the effective limitation period of the relevant offence has not lapsed; and
3. enhancing protection for the interests of surrendered persons, such as processing only requests from the central authority (as opposed to the local authority) of a place, following up with the Mainland the arrangements for helping sentenced persons to serve their sentence in Hong Kong, negotiating appropriate means and arrangements for post-surrender visits, etc.

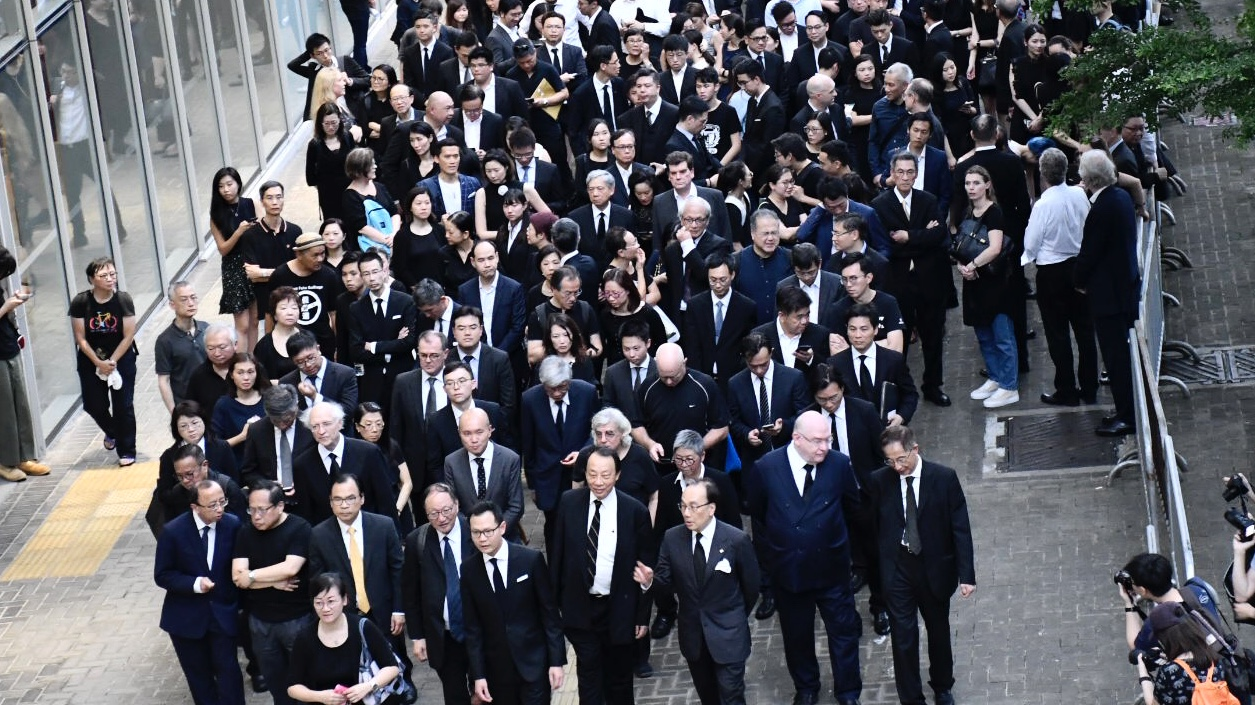
Thousands of lawyers marched in black against the bill on 6 June 2019.

Hong Kong's five major business chambers—the Hong Kong General Chamber of Commerce (HKGCC), the Chinese General Chamber of Commerce, the Chinese Manufacturers' Association of Hong Kong, the Federation of Hong Kong Industries, and the Hong Kong Chinese Importers' and Exporters' Association quickly welcomed the concessions, but legal scholars and pro-democrats opposing the bill argued there was still no guarantee of human rights and fair treatment for fugitives sent across the border. John Lee dismissed calls to embed those safeguards in the proposed bill, claiming the current proposal would offer greater flexibility, adding he was confident mainland authorities would stay true to their promises, even without protection clauses in the bill.

The Law Society of Hong Kong urged the government not to rush the legislation but should stop to conduct extensive consultation before it goes any further. The Bar Association said in response to the concessions that the additional safeguards provided by the government was "riddled with uncertainties ...[and that it] offers scarcely any reliable assurances." On 6 June, some 3,000 Hong Kong lawyers, representing around one quarter of the city's lawyers, marched against the bill. Wearing black, they marched from the Court of Final Appeal to the Central Government Offices. While lawyers expressed grave reservations about the openness and fairness of the justice system in China, limited access to a lawyer, and the prevalence of torture, Secretary for Security John Lee said the legal sector did not really understand the bill.

Amnesty International, Human Rights Watch, Human Rights Monitor and more than 70 other non-governmental organisations wrote an open letter to Chief Executive Carrie Lam on 7 June stating the "serious shortcomings in the proposed amendment", claiming that the additional safeguards would still be unlikely to provide genuine and effective protection as it did not resolve the real risk of torture or other ill-treatment, including detention in poor conditions for indefinite periods, or other serious human rights violations which are prohibited under the International Covenant on Civil and Political Rights, the Convention against Torture and Other Cruel, Inhuman or Degrading Treatment or Punishment.

== Pre-suspension protests ==
=== 31 March ===
The first protest happened on 31 March with an attendance of 12,000 pro-democracy protesters according to organisers, the Civil Human Rights Front (CHRF); police put the peak figure at 5,200.

=== 28 April ===
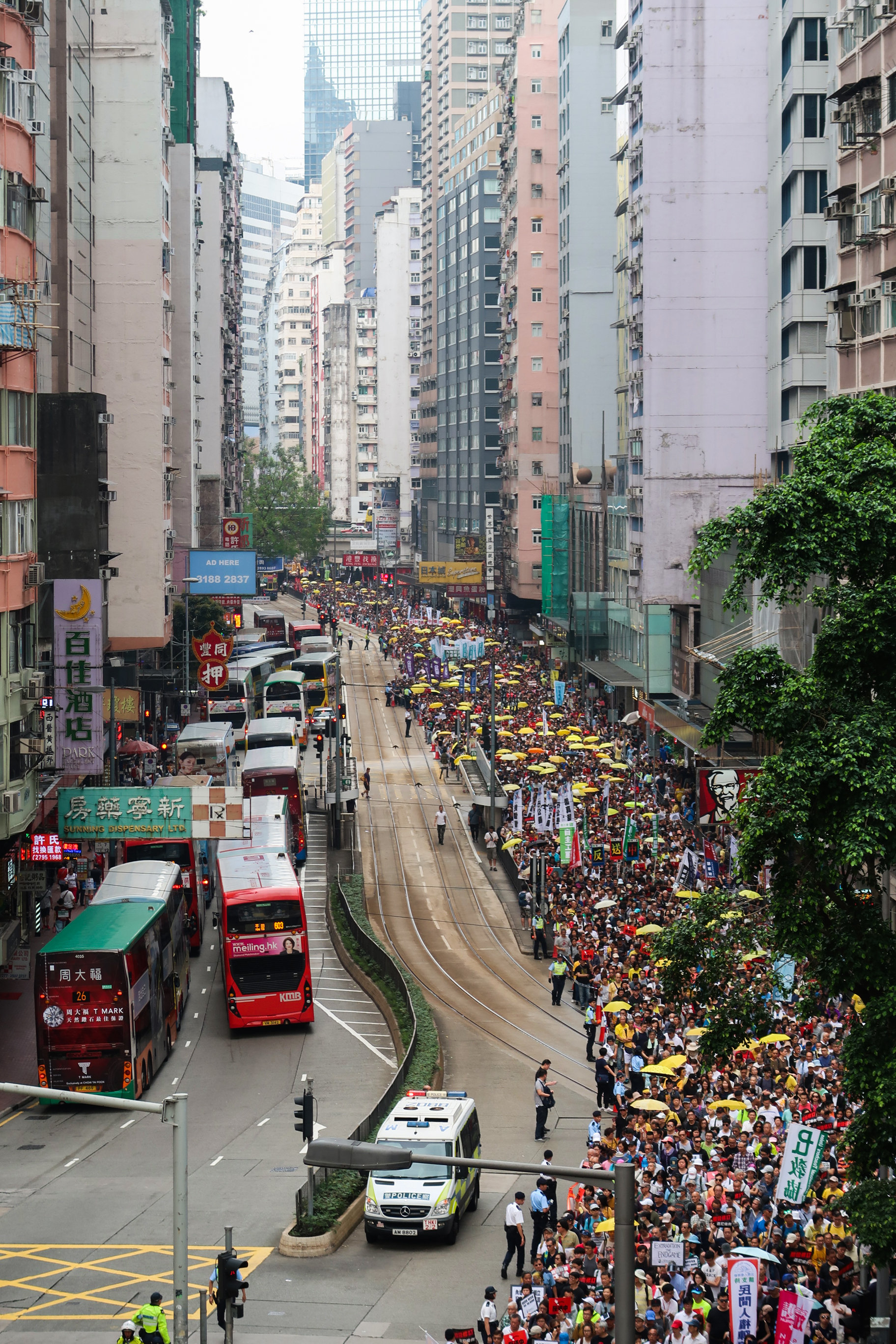
Thousands of protesters marched on the street against the proposed extradition law on 28 April 2019.

On 28 April, the movement gained stronger momentum as an estimated 130,000 protesters joined the march against the bill; Police estimated 22,800 joined at its height. The claimed turnout was the largest since an estimated 510,000 joined the annual 1 July protest in 2014. A day after the protest, Chief Executive Carrie Lam was adamant that the bill would be enacted and said the Legislative Councillors had to pass new extradition laws before their summer break, even though the man at the heart of a case used to justify the urgency of new legislation Chan Tong-kai had been jailed for 29 months shortly before.

=== 9 June ===
While reports suggested it had been the largest ever, certainly the largest protest Hong Kong has seen since the 1997 handover, surpassing the turnout seen at mass rallies in support of the Tiananmen protests of 1989 and 1 July demonstration of 2003, CHRF convenor Jimmy Sham said that 1.03 million people attended the march, while the police put the crowd at 270,000 at its peak.

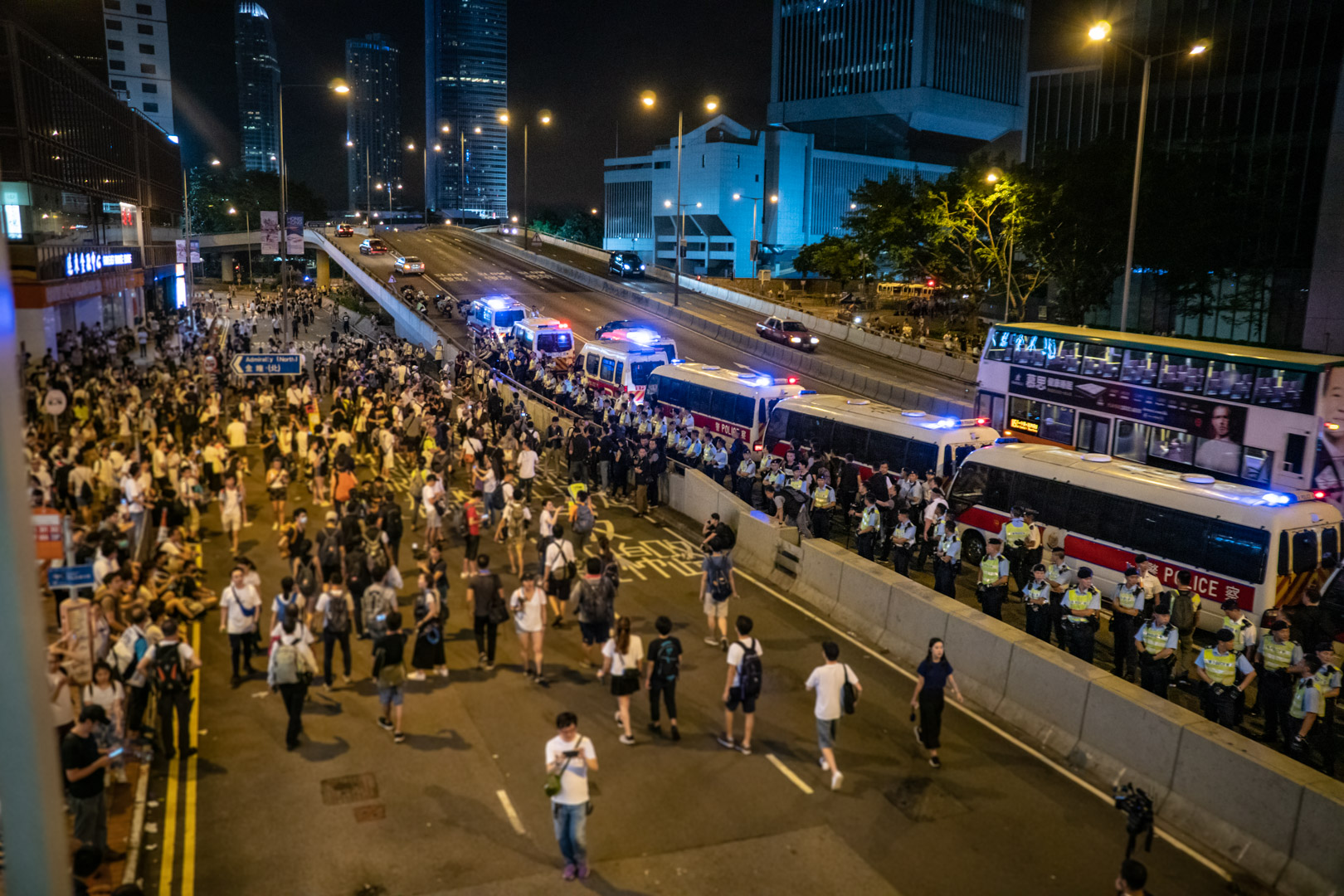
Protesters on Harcourt Road at night, with police on standby. 9 June 2019

Hundreds of protesters camped in front of the government headquarters well into the night, with more joining them in response to calls from Demosistō and pro-independence activists. Police formed a human chain to prevent protesters from entering Harcourt Road, the main road next to government headquarters, while Special Tactical Squad (STS) stood by for potential conflicts. Although the CHRF officially had called an end to the march at 10 pm, around 100 protesters remained at the Civic Square.

At 11 pm, the government issued a press statement, saying it "acknowledge[s] and respect[s] that people have different views on a wide range of issues", but insisted the second reading debate on the bill would resume on 12 June. Around midnight, tensions escalated and clashes broke out between protesters and officers at the Legislative Council Complex. Protesters threw bottles and metal barricades at police and pushed barricades while officers responded with pepper spray. Riot police pushed back against the crowd and secured the area, while police on Harcourt Road also pushed protesters back onto the pavements. Clashes shifted to Lung Wo Road as many protesters gathered and barricaded themselves from the officers. Several hundred protesters were herded by officers towards Lung King Street in Wan Chai around 2 am and then moved onto Gloucester Road. By the end of the clearance, 19 protesters had been arrested.

=== 12 June ===
A general strike had been called for 12 June, the day of the planned resumption of the second reading of the extradition bill. The Police started stopping and searching on commuters at the exits of Admiralty Station the night before. Sits-in began at and around Tamar Park in the morning, and around 8 am, a crowd rushed onto Harcourt Road and the nearby streets, blocking traffic. Around 11 am, the Legislative Council Secretariat announced that the second reading debate on the extradition bill had been postponed indefinitely.

In the afternoon, riot police and the Special Tactical Squad, who hid their identifying numbers, were deployed. They fired tear gas and shot rubber bullets and bean bag rounds at protesters on Harcourt Road. The crowd fled to Citic Tower, where the gathering had been approved by the police and was peaceful. As people trickled through the jammed central revolving door and a small side door, the police fired another two tear gas canisters into the trapped crowd fuelling panic. Commissioner of Police Stephen Lo declared the clashes a "riot" and condemned the protesters' behaviour.

Many videos of aggressive police action appeared online, showing tear gas canisters being fired at peaceful and unarmed protesters, first-aid volunteers, and even reporters. Amnesty International published a report which concluded that the use of force by police against the largely peaceful protest was unnecessary and excessive and that police had "violated international human rights law and standards."

Lo's declaration and police behaviour gave rise to new demands in later protests: to retract the characterisation of the clashes as a "riot" and to establish an independent commission of inquiry into police brutality.

=== 16 June ===
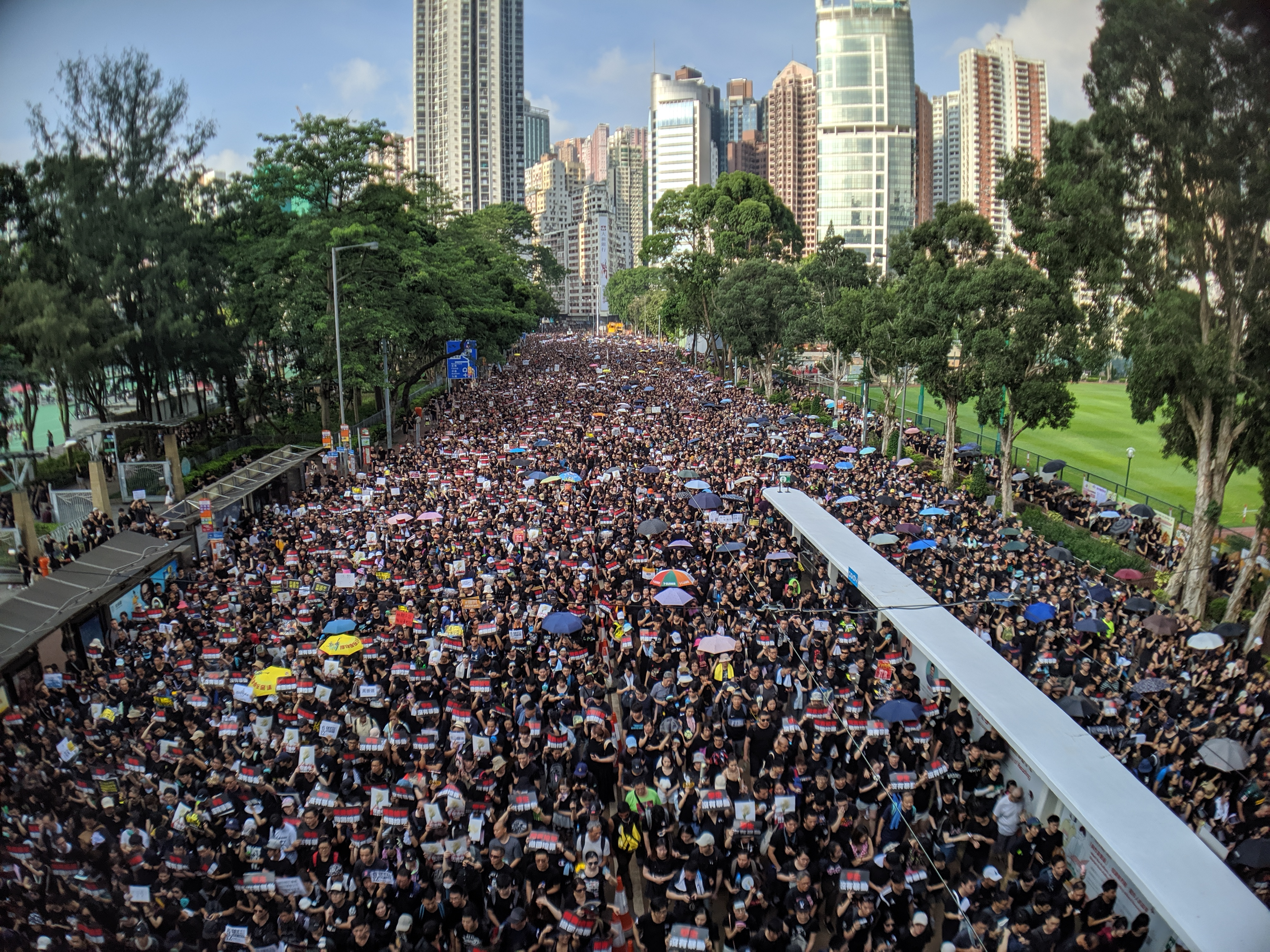
Organisers estimated nearly two million protesters took to the streets calling for the full withdrawal of the extradition bill on 16 June.

On 15 June, Carrie Lam announced that it would suspend the second reading of the bill without a set a time frame on the seeking of public views. However, no apology nor resignation was forthcoming at this point. The pro-democracy camp demanded a full withdrawal of the bill and said they would go ahead with the 16 June rally as planned.

On the day, the route from Victoria Park in Causeway Bay to the government headquarters in Admiralty was totally taken over by the large crowd from 3 pm all the way to 11 pm. Although crowd control measures were in force, yet the large number of participants forced police to open all the six lanes of Hennessy Road, the main route; nevertheless, the masses then spilled over onto three parallel streets in Wan Chai. While the police said that there were 338,000 demonstrators at its peak on the original route, the Civil Human Rights Front claimed the participation of "almost 2 million plus 1 citizens", denoting the protester who committed suicide the day before.

The government issued a statement at 8:30 pm where Carrie Lam apologised to Hong Kong residents and promised to "sincerely and humbly accept all criticism and to improve and serve the public." A government source told to the South China Morning Post that the administration was making it clear that there was no timetable to relaunch the suspended bill, the legislation would die a "natural death" when the current term of the Legislative Council ended in July next year. On 18 June, Carrie Lam offered an apology for mishandling the extradition bill in person, but did not meet the protesters' demands of withdrawing the bill completely or resigning.

== From suspension to withdrawal ==
After the intense clashes on 12 June, the Legislative Council called off the general meetings on 13 and 14 June, and also postponed the general meetings on 17 and 18 June. Pro-Beijing newspaper Sing Tao Daily reported that Lam went to meet with Chinese Vice Premier Han Zheng in Shenzhen on 14 June evening. Lam then had a cabinet meeting with her top officials at 10:30 pm, lasting until midnight.

Students unions, representing some protesters, issued four demands: total withdrawal of the extradition bill; retraction of all references to the 12 June protest being a riot; release all arrested protesters; and accountability of police officers who used excessive force. They warned of escalated protest action if the demands were not met. Hong Kong Catholic Apostolic Administrator Cardinal John Tong and Hong Kong Christian Council chairman Reverend Eric So Shing-yit also issued a joint statement calling for a complete withdrawal of the extradition bill and an independent inquiry into allegations of police brutality against protesters.

As the city marked the 22nd anniversary of its 1997 handover, the annual pro-democracy protest march organised by civil rights groups claimed a record turnout of 550,000 while police placed the estimate around 190,000. Separately, hundreds of young protesters stormed the Legislative Council and defaced symbols associated with the People's Republic of China (PRC) and pro-Beijing elements inside the building.

On 9 July, Carrie Lam said the controversial bill "is dead", but still refused to meet the protesters' demand to withdraw it. The protesters continued to demand full withdrawal of the bill, among other demands regarding alleged police misconducts and universal suffrage. The confrontations between the protesters and the police had since escalated. On 21 July, the police is accused of colluding with a gang who indiscriminately attacked passengers at Yuen Long station. A poll conducted in August showed that more than 90% of supporters of the protests expressed dissatisfaction with police misconduct, and, among their five core demands, the primary demand had shifted from the withdrawal of the bill to the establishment of independent commission of inquiry.

On 4 September, Carrie Lam announced that the government would officially withdraw the bill in October. However, she dismissed the other four core demands from the protesters.

The bill was officially withdrawn on 23 October. Chan Tong-kai was released from prison on the same day.

== See also ==
- 25 August 2019 Hong Kong protest
- Causeway Bay Books disappearances
- List of Hong Kong surrender of fugitive offenders agreements
- Extradition law in China
- Extradition law in UK
- Hong Kong–Taiwan relations
- National Security (Legislative Provisions) Bill 2003
- Hong Kong national security law
