= Victor Mallet visa controversy =

- Date: 14 August 2018
- Venue: Foreign Correspondents' Club of Hong Kong
- Location: 2 Lower Albert Road, Hong Kong
- Type: Lunchtime talk (trigger event)
- Theme: Hong Kong independence
- Participants: Andy Chan

The Victor Mallet visa controversy is an incident in Hong Kong in 2018 that many pundits consider as having major implications for freedom of speech in Hong Kong. The Foreign Correspondents' Club (FCC) scheduled a lunchtime talk for 14 August. The invitee was Andy Chan, convenor of the Hong Kong National Party (HKNP); Victor Mallet, vice-president of the press organisation, chaired the session. The government of China had called for the cancellation of the talk, and Hong Kong government expressed its regret because the issue of independence was said to cross the red lines on national sovereignty. After a visit to Bangkok, Mallet was denied a working visa by the Hong Kong government. Mallet was subjected to a four-hour interrogation by immigration officers on his return from Thailand on Sunday, 7 October before he was finally allowed to enter Hong Kong.

In the absence of an official explanation, Mallet's visa rejection was widely seen to be retribution for his role in chairing the Chan talk, which the FCC refused to cancel. The Hong Kong Journalists Association, which has for years lived under the pressure of self-censorship, immediately warned of the "death knell of freedom of speech". Secretary for Security John Lee insisted the ban on Mallet was unrelated to press freedom, but declined to explain the decision. The incident caused a furious debate over the one country, two systems model which Deng Xiaoping promised for Hong Kong, and over restrictions to freedoms that were promised in the Sino-British Joint Declaration which included a "high degree of autonomy", democratic reforms, and maintenance of the freedom of the press.

== Background ==
The Hong Kong National Party is a local political group that advocates the independence of Hong Kong, and the government of the People's Republic of China in Beijing considers it to be a separatist organisation. In September 2018, in an unprecedented step for the city, it became the first ever political party to be proscribed by the Hong Kong government.

As part of its regular lunchtime talk series, the Foreign Correspondents' Club of Hong Kong (FCC) hosted an event to take place on 14 August 2018. The invitee was Andy Chan, convenor of the Hong Kong National Party (HKNP), a political party that was facing a ban by the government of Hong Kong. Victor Mallet was to chair the session.

The Beijing government wanted the FCC to cancel the luncheon talk by Chan. The Chinese Foreign Ministry's Hong Kong office issued an announcement on 3 Aug, stating its resolute opposition to "any external forces providing a platform for the independence forces to spread their absurd ideas". On the other hand, the HK government expressed "deep regrets" over the FCC's decision to host the talk. Many leading pro-Beijing political figures, notably former chief executive CY Leung, vocally opposed and tried to pressure and intimidate the FCC to rescind the invitation in the days running up to the talk. Leung argued that the FCC was leasing its premises, the Old Dairy Farm Depot, from the government, and said that it was paying "token rent" when it was in fact paying market rent. The HK government said: "It is totally inappropriate and unacceptable for any person to openly promote and advocate the independence of Hong Kong, [and] as such, it is also totally inappropriate and unacceptable for any organisation to provide a public platform to espouse such views."

In its own defence, the FCC said that it neither opposed nor endorsed the views of its guest speakers. It insisted that the public has a right to hear the views of different sides of any debate as Hong Kong is governed by the rule of law, and respect for freedom of speech was enshrined. When the government-owned broadcaster Radio Television Hong Kong (RTHK) and local stations all declined to broadcast the event, the FCC arranged for the speech to be live-streamed on Facebook.

== Refused visa ==
As the controversy blew up, Victor Mallet was Asia news editor of the Financial Times based in Hong Kong where he lived with his family. He was vice-president of the FCC. Mallet and his employer attempted to renew his working visa in the normal way but were notified late on 2 October that his visa, which expired on 3 October, would not be renewed. No reasons were given. Returning from a visit to Bangkok, Mallet found out that he had been denied a working visa by the Hong Kong government. He was subsequently allowed to return on a seven-day visit after being interrogated by Hong Kong immigration.

As British citizens are normally allowed to visit without a visa for business and pleasure for up to 180 days, the government's decision was heavily criticised by opposition lawmakers. It was however welcomed by their pro-establishment counterparts. A spokesperson for the Financial Times, said "[t]his is the first time we have encountered [a refusal to renew the work visa] in Hong Kong, and we have not been given a reason for the rejection."

On 8 November, Mallet attempted to enter Hong Kong again as a visitor, but was turned away after four hours of questioning at immigration, again without being given a reason. Mallet had ostensibly hoped to resign vice-presidency of the FCC, a post he has held since 2017, and also to hand over his responsibilities at the Financial Times properly. A government source merely stated that border control cases of the territory were considered on a case-by-case basis.

== Political reaction ==
In the absence of an official explanation, Mallet's visa rejection was widely seen to be retribution for his role in chairing the Chan talk which the FCC refused to call off. The FCC, the organisation at the centre of the controversy, does not support independence for Hong Kong. It said that the incident: "highlight[s] Beijing's tightening grip on the territory and the steady erosion of basic rights that are guaranteed in Hong Kong's laws and international agreements". On demanding a full explanation from the Hong Kong authorities for the extraordinary, extremely rare, if not unprecedented move, the FCC initiated a petition in October asking the government to provide a full explanation for the visa refusal. Furthermore, 19 former FCC presidents signed a letter to the Chief Executive in early November, urging the government to explain Mallet's case.

Secretary for Security John Lee insisted the ban on Mallet was unrelated to press freedom, but declined to explain the decision, citing "data privacy considerations". Hong Kong Chief Executive Carrie Lam said that the Immigration Department was not obliged to explain individual cases. The Legislative Council of Hong Kong rejected a motion to summon immigration officials to the legislature to answer for the Victor Mallet case. The motion failed when 36 pro-establishment lawmakers out-voted 24 pan-democrat lawmakers. Passage of the motion would have forced Security Minister John Lee Ka-chiu to explain the decision not to renew Mallet's visa. Lee argued that disclosure of individual cases would undermine immigration controls and security, and that not disclosing reasons for visa refusals is also common practice overseas, and that only 1.3 percent of applications had been refused so far in 2018. He added that compliance with Hong Kong laws was a must.

British consul general in Hong Kong Andrew Heyn wrote to Carrie Lam about Mallet's denial of entry. Mark Field, British minister of state for Asia and the Pacific, warned that the controversy could affect business sentiment in the city. He expressed concern that the increasing signs of pressure upon "one country, two systems" would undermine business confidence. Field was scheduled to meet Chief Secretary Matthew Cheung as he passed through Hong Kong.

Malcolm Rifkind, the British foreign secretary from 1995 to 1997, criticised the visa ruling as a "bizarre decision". He said that Hong Kong's core values, including free expression and the rule of law, were under pressure. Saying that "'national security' was increasingly being used to justify disproportionate constrictions on fundamental rights", Rifkind urged Hong Kong to retract their decision, saying that the rule of law and basic freedoms had been a bedrock of Hong Kong's prosperity and stability. Equally, former Chief Secretary Anson Chan echoed the sentiment about the government's decision as a threat to business confidence. On the other hand, pro-Beijing lawmaker Starry Lee of the Democratic Alliance for the Betterment and Progress of Hong Kong said "For the FCC to ignore the warning from China's Ministry of Foreign Affairs, that's a very serious provocation". Another legislator Priscilla Leung was quoted saying "There is no room for using journalism as a disguise for promoting independence or self-determination."

Governments of the US and the European Union have all expressed concerns over Mallet's visa refusal and urged Hong Kong to explain the decision. US publications like The New York Times and The Washington Post expressed their concerns over the case in the US in editorials respectively entitled "China's Media Crackdown Spreads to Hong Kong" and "China's Authoritarian Export". Marco Rubio, co-chairman of US Congressional Executive Commission on China, asserted that Beijing's tactics used in the past to pressurise foreign news agencies in China were now being "extended to Hong Kong".

The Hong Kong Journalists Association expressed its shock and anger at the government, saying: "Freedom of speech and press freedom are the foundations of Hong Kong's success. The denial of [Mallet’s] visa will further harm press freedom and freedom of speech, and it will severely harm Hong Kong's status as an international city." Reporters Without Borders and the Hong Kong Bar Association also criticised the apparent ban of Mallet. On Carrie Lam's maiden visit to Japan, local journalists questioned her intensely over the government's decision to refuse a work visa for Mallet. Lam refused to comment except to cite the fact that "so many overseas media, including Japanese media, have been using Hong Kong as a base for reporting is by itself a very good indication of the freedom of reporting, of journalism, in Hong Kong".

The state-run China Daily responded to the criticisms saying that visa renewal of the territory was a sovereign right that no other governments could interfere with. It accused foreign governments of grandstanding: "What they really want is not an answer but to create the illusion that freedom of speech and the press in Hong Kong is dwindling... the accusers' real intention is to smear the way 'one country, two systems' is being practised."

== See also ==
- Knife attack on Kevin Lau
- Censorship in Hong Kong
- Immigration Department (Hong Kong)#List of notable activists refused entry to Hong Kong
