= Chan Ho-tin =

Hong Kong politician (born 1990)

- 陳浩天
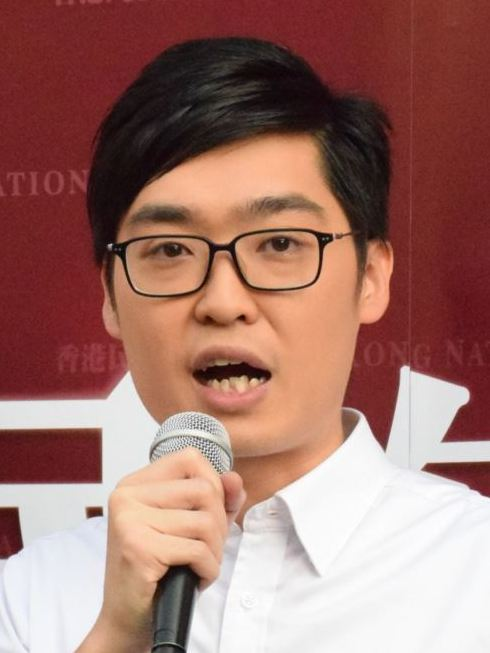

Convenor of the Hong Kong National Party
- In office 28 March 2016 – 24 September 2018
- Preceded by: New party
- Succeeded by: Party banned

Personal details
- Born: 6 September 1990 (age 36) Hong Kong
- Party: Hong Kong National Party (2016–2018)
- Education: Hong Kong Polytechnic University (BE, BBA)

Chinese name
- Traditional Chinese: 陳浩天
- Simplified Chinese: 陈浩天
Transcriptions
Standard Mandarin
- Hanyu Pinyin: Chén Hàotiān
Yue: Cantonese
- Yale Romanization: Chàhn Houh tīn
- Jyutping: Can^{4} Hou^{6} tin^{1}

Andy Chan Ho-tin (Chinese: 陳浩天; born 6 September 1990) is a Hong Kong pro-independence political activist. He is a founding member and the convenor of the Hong Kong National Party, the first party to advocate for Hong Kong independence.

Chan attracted media attention when the Hong Kong government strongly criticised his activities after the establishment of the Hong Kong National Party. In the 2016 Hong Kong Legislative Council election, his candidature was disqualified by the returning officer for New Territories East, due to his political stance on secession and independence of Hong Kong from the People's Republic of China.

== Early life and education ==
Chan was born in Hong Kong in 1990 and studied engineering and business administration at the Hong Kong Polytechnic University (HKPU). He first participated in politics when he joined the 2014 Hong Kong protests (dubbed the "Umbrella Revolution") against the Chinese government's decision to set restrictions on the nominating method of the candidates for the 2017 Hong Kong Chief Executive election. He was one of the protesters who went to the scene after the police's clearance of the "civic square" occupied by the protesters on 27 September.

== Political activities ==
Chan was dissatisfied with the student leaders in the protests and called for more radical and militant approaches. He blamed the leaders of the Hong Kong Federation of Students (HKFS) for the failure of the movement, and launched the disaffiliation campaign to separate the Hong Kong Polytechnic University Students' Union (HKPUSU) from the HKFS membership as the convenor of the HKPU Disaffiliation Concern Group. The HKPUSU eventually passed the threshold of 1,700 votes in the referendum, with approval for disaffiliation winning with 1,190 votes.

After the disaffiliation campaign, Chan began to strive for Hong Kong independence. On 28 March 2016, Chan established the Hong Kong National Party. Chan's move drew attacks from the Chinese state media and Hong Kong government. An editorial piece in the Chinese government-owned Global Times slammed the Hong Kong National Party by stating that it is "impossible to achieve" independence for Hong Kong and calling it "a practical joke" and "proliferation of extremism in Hong Kong". The State Council's Hong Kong and Macau Affairs Office issued a statement through the official Xinhua News Agency on 30 March 2016, following the declaration of the formation of Hong Kong National Party, condemning the party "has harmed the country's sovereignty, security, endangered the prosperity and stability of Hong Kong, and the core interests of Hong Kong..." The Hong Kong government issued a statement after the formation of the party, stating that "any suggestion that Hong Kong should be independent or any movement to advocate such 'independence' is against the Basic Law, and will undermine the stability and prosperity of Hong Kong and impair the interest of the general public…"

=== 2016 Hong Kong Legislative Council elections ===
In the 2016 Hong Kong Legislative Council election, Chan's candidacy in the New Territories West was questioned by the returning officer of the Electoral Affairs Commission (EAC). The EAC required Chan and all other candidates to sign an additional confirm form to declare their understanding of Hong Kong being an inalienable part of China as stipulated in the Basic Law of Hong Kong. Chan refused to sign the form and his candidacy was "invalidated" along with five other pro-independence activists after the end of the nomination period. The Hong Kong National Party launched a rally on 5 August which was dubbed the "first pro-independence rally in Hong Kong" against the EAC's disqualifications.

=== 2018 Foreign Correspondents' Club speech ===
In a speech at the Foreign Correspondents' Club, Hong Kong on 14 August 2018, Chan called for Hong Kong's independence from China, calling the latter "a threat to all free peoples in the world" and "our colonial master". In response, the Office of the Commissioner of the Ministry of Foreign Affairs of the People's Republic of China in the Hong Kong Special Administrative Region castigated the FCC for allowing Chan to speak, as did the Hong Kong government.

The event gave rise to a controversy involving the de facto banning from Hong Kong of the journalist who presided over the talk. In the absence of an official explanation, Victor Mallet's visa rejection was widely seen to be retribution for his role in chairing the talk, which the FCC refused to cancel.

=== 2019 Osaka G20 Summit and anti-extradition bill protests ===
On 27 June 2019, Chan traveled to Osaka, Japan to join a demonstration against the CCP. Prior to his arrival in Osaka, Chan was detained at the airport by the local authorities for three hours.

=== 2019 arrests ===
On 2 August 2019, Chan, along with a group of seven others, were arrested during a police raid on a flat in an Industrial Building on Au Pui Wan Street in Sha Tin. The group were detained for offences including possession of explosives without licence, possession of offensive weapons, and selling poisons without licence. Police found two bows and six arrows inside the flat, as well as a suspected petrol bomb, materials for petrol bombs and oils containing cannabis-derived substances. Chan was arrested again on 30 August for rioting and assaulting a police officer at the 2019 Sheung Shui protest as he tried to make his way to Japan.

Party political offices
New political party	Convenor of Hong Kong National Party; 2016–2018	Succeeded by Office abolished Party banned by Hong Kong government
