= Hong Kong National Party =

Localist political party in Hong Kong

Hong Kong National Party 香港民族黨
- Convenor: Chan Ho-tin
- Spokesman: Jason Chow Ho-fai
- Founded: 28 March 2016
- Banned: 24 September 2018
- Ideology: Hong Kong nationalism Hong Kong independence Anti-communism; Social conservatism
- Political position: Right-wing
- Colours: Maroon

Website
- hknationalparty.com (defunct)

Hong Kong National Party
- Traditional Chinese: 香港民族黨
- Simplified Chinese: 香港民族党
Transcriptions
Standard Mandarin
- Hanyu Pinyin: Xiānggǎng Mínzú Dǎng
Yue: Cantonese
- Yale Romanization: Hēung góng màhn juhk dóng
- Jyutping: Hoeng^{1} gong^{2} man^{4} zuk^{6} dong^{2}

The Hong Kong National Party was a localist political party from 2016 to 2018 in Hong Kong. It was the first political party in Hong Kong to advocate for Hong Kong independence. (Note: The first non-local political party advocating for Hong Kong independence was the Hong Kong Independence Party based in London, England.) The Hong Kong National Party is also the first political party to be outlawed since Hong Kong's 1997 handover to China.

In the 2016 Hong Kong legislative election, the HKNP's convenor Chan Ho-tin was barred from standing due to his pro-independence stance for Hong Kong. Chan was among the first individual barred from participating in the election along with five other pro-independence activists. The Hong Kong SAR government states that Hong Kong independence contravenes the principle of "one country, two systems" and Article 1 and 12 of the Basic Law, which stipulates that Hong Kong is an SAR of the People's Republic of China.

On 24 September 2018, the Hong Kong SAR government officially declared the HKNP to be an illegal society and banned the operation of HKNP on national security grounds under the Societies Ordinance.

== Platform ==
The Hong Kong National Party states that it wants to establish Hong Kong as "a self-reliant nation. An independent Hong Kong" as the party's goal. The party lays out six policies on their platform:

1. build an independent and free Republic of Hong Kong;
2. defend the interests of Hong Kongers and maintain such interests as fundamental;
3. consolidate the national consciousness of the Hong Kong nation to define Hong Kong citizenship;
4. support and participate in all effective actions of resistance;
5. abolish the Hong Kong Basic Law and let Hong Kongers make their own Constitution; and
6. construct influential powers which support the independence of Hong Kong, and establish Hong-Kong-oriented organisations and pressure groups in various fields such as economics, culture, and education, so as to found the powers for independence.

The party asserts its ultimate objectives to be the cessation of Chinese government control in Hong Kong and the establishment of a sovereign and self-governing Republic of Hong Kong. The party said it would use "whatever effective means" to push for independence, including fielding candidates in the 2016 Legislative Council election.

== Founding ==
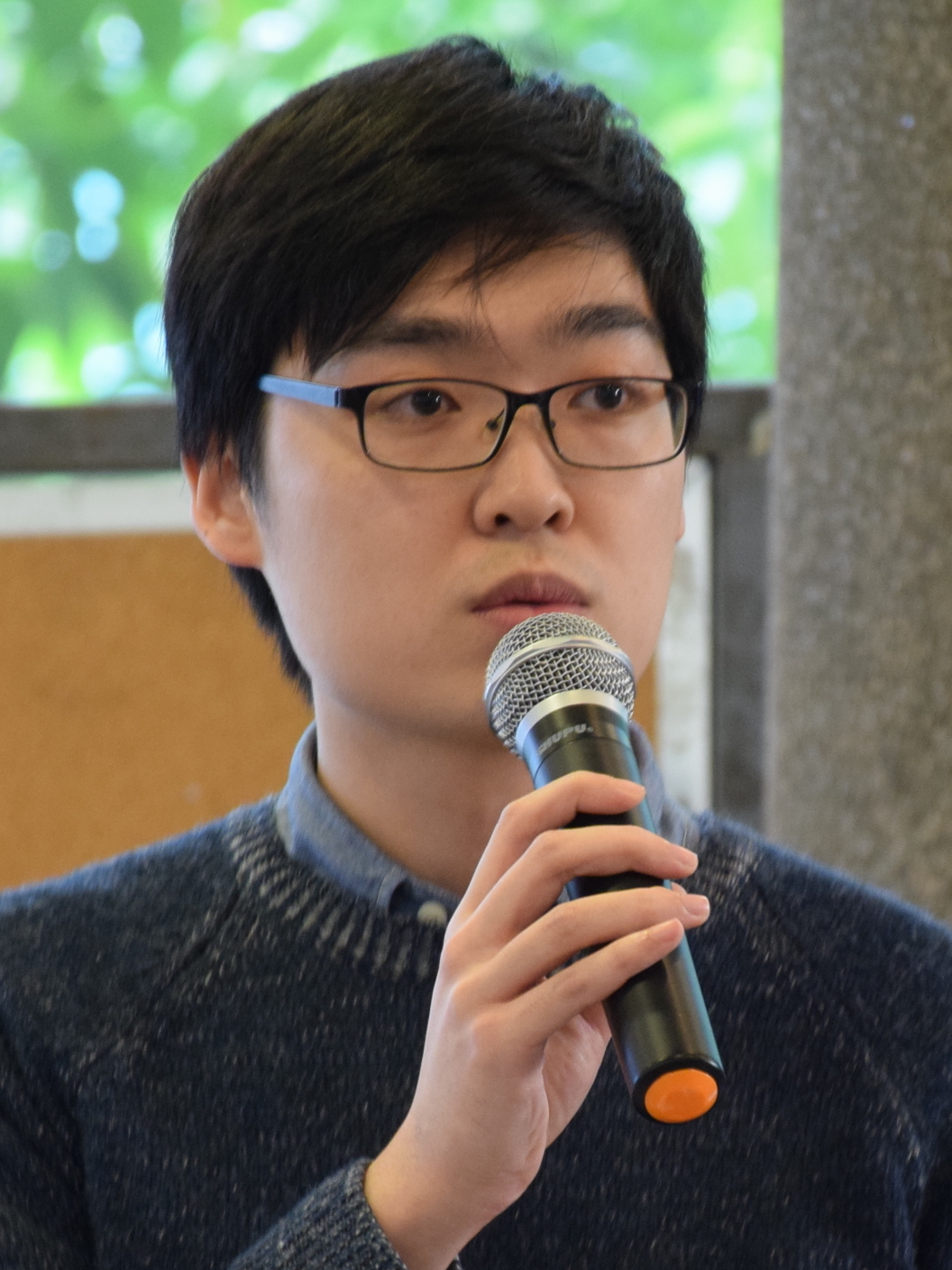
Chan Ho-tin, founder and convenor of the Hong Kong National Party

The Hong Kong National Party was established on 28 March 2016 by members consisting of mostly active university students, also some fresh graduates who have been working for a few years and professionals who were mostly in their 20s. The party was convened by Chan Ho-tin, a Hong Kong Polytechnic University student who participated in the protests of 2014 and led a campaign in an attempt to split the HKPU student union from the Hong Kong Federation of Students.

The Companies Registry refused to register the Hong Kong National Party without giving explanation. District Councillor and solicitor Maggie Chan Man-ki said it was legal for the Companies Registry to deny the application as advocating Hong Kong independence is an illegal activity according to the Crimes Ordinances Sections 9 and 10.

An editorial piece in the state-run Global Times slammed the Hong Kong National Party by stating that it is "impossible to achieve" independence for Hong Kong and calling it "a practical joke". The editorial opined, "Today, there is a proliferation of extremism in Hong Kong. The ‘Hong Kong National Party’ can be considered to be at the forefront of extremism – even the possibility of using violence is mentioned." The State Council's Hong Kong and Macau Affairs Office issued a statement through the official Xinhua News Agency on 30 March 2016, following the declaration of the formation of Hong Kong National Party, condemning the party: "The action to establish a pro-independence organisation by an extremely small group of people in Hong Kong has harmed the country’s sovereignty, security, endangered the prosperity and stability of Hong Kong, and the core interests of Hong Kong... It is firmly opposed by all Chinese people, including some seven million Hong Kong people. It is also a serious violation of the country’s constitution, Hong Kong’s Basic Law and the relevant existing laws."

The Hong Kong government issued a statement after the formation of the party, stating that "any suggestion that Hong Kong should be independent or any movement to advocate such 'independence' is against the Basic Law, and will undermine the stability and prosperity of Hong Kong and impair the interest of the general public… The SAR Government will take action according to the law."

== Disqualification from election ==
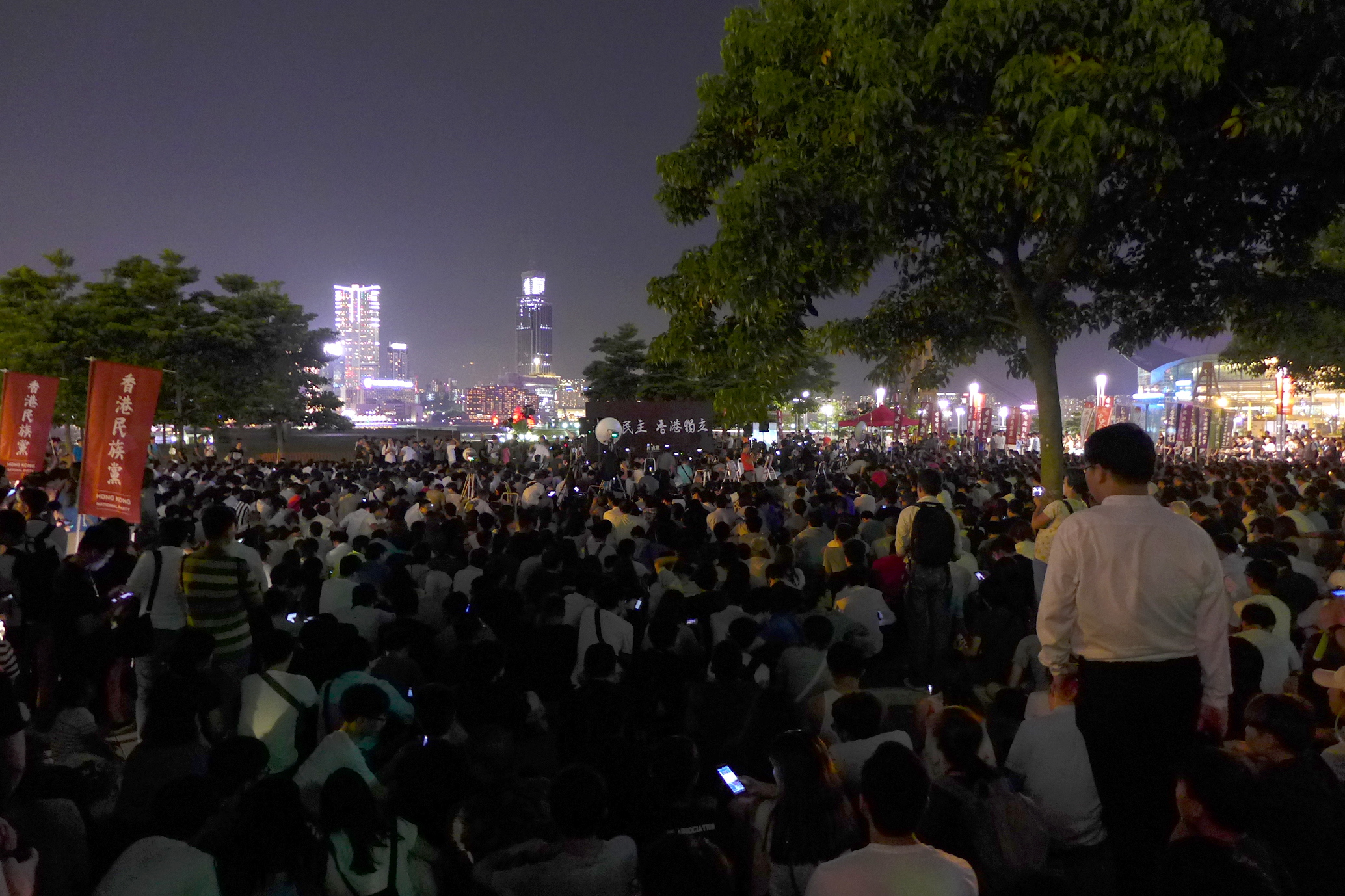
Some claimed 2,500 people attended a rally organised by the National Party in the wake of the LegCo candidates' disqualification controversy on 5 August 2016.

In the 2016 Legislative Council election, convenor Chan Ho-tin intended to run in the New Territories West. The Electoral Affairs Commission (EAC) carried out a new election measure, requiring all candidates to sign an additional "confirmation form" in the nomination to declare their understanding of Hong Kong being an inalienable part of China as stipulated in the Basic Law of Hong Kong. Chan refused to sign the form and his candidacy was "invalidated" along with five other pro-independence activists after the end of the nomination period. The Hong Kong National Party launched a rally on 5 August which was dubbed the "first pro-independence rally in Hong Kong" against the EAC's disqualifications.

== Ban ==
On 17 July 2018, the Hong Kong Police Force served the party convenor a notice under the Societies Ordinance and sought to ban the Party. The police claimed that the party has engaged in sedition and that the party may be banned on grounds of national security with respect to Chinese territorial integrity. The notice contained highly detailed surveillance material on the party leadership's public engagements.

The ban prohibited anyone who claims to be a HKNP member, or is found to provide aid to the party in any way, would be under the threat of being fined and jailed for up to two years. The definition of "providing aid" to the party and the two leaders were not made clear. Chan's lawyers wrote to the Department of Justice seeking an assurance that providing legal assistance to him would not be regarded as providing assistance to the HKNP, but that assurance was not forthcoming.

On 24 October 2018, Andy Chan and party spokesman Jason Chow Ho-fai filed appeals against the ban with the chief executive and Executive Council. The two filed separate appeals to make clear they were acting as individuals, not as a party.

== Victor Mallet controversy ==
In August, a controversy erupted in 2018 when the FCC hosted a lunchtime talk with convenor Andy Chan on 14 August. Victor Mallet, Vice-chairman of the press organisation, chaired the session. The event was opposed by both Hong Kong SAR government and Chinese central government, because the issue of independence was said to cross one of the bottom lines on national sovereignty. Upon returning to Hong Kong after a visit to Bangkok, Mallet was denied a working visa by the Hong Kong government. Mallet was subjected to a four-hour interrogation by immigration officers on his return from Thailand on Sunday 7 October before he was finally allowed to enter Hong Kong on a seven-day tourist visa.

Mallet's visa rejection was widely seen to be retribution for his role in chairing the Andy Chan talk which the FCC refused to call off. Secretary for Security John Lee insisted the ban on Mallet was unrelated to press freedom, but declined to explain the decision.

== See also ==
- Hong Kong Independence Party
- Hong Kong independence movement
- Localism in Hong Kong
- Youngspiration
