= Chen Zhimin =

Chinese politician

- 陈智敏

Deputy Minister of Public Security
- In office August 2009 – 9 June 2017
- Minister: Meng Jianzhu

Assistant of Minister of Public Security
- In office March 2005 – August 2009
- Minister: Zhou Yongkang→Meng Jianzhu

Personal details
- Born: October 1955 (age 70) Zhuji, Zhejiang, China
- Party: Chinese Communist Party
- Education: Chinese Academy of Sciences

Chen Zhimin (simplified Chinese: 陈智敏; traditional Chinese: 陳智敏; pinyin: Chén Zhìmǐn; born October 1955) is a Chinese politician.

== Biography ==
Chen was born in Zhuji, Zhejiang in October 1955. He graduated from Chinese Academy of Sciences, where he majored in management science and engineering.

During the Cultural Revolution was launched by Mao Zedong, Chen became involved in politics in 1969. In December 1985, Chen joined the Chinese Communist Party.

In March 2005, he was promoted to become the Assistant of Minister of Public Security, a position he held until 2009. He was promoted to become the Deputy Minister of Public Security in August 2009. In January 2018, he became a member of the 13th National Committee of the Chinese People's Political Consultative Conference.
