= Article 23 =

Clause of the Hong Kong Basic Law

Article 23 is an article of the Hong Kong Basic Law. It states that Hong Kong "shall enact laws on its own to prohibit any act of treason, secession, sedition, subversion against the Central People's Government, or theft of state secrets, to prohibit foreign political organizations or bodies from conducting political activities in the Region, and to prohibit political organizations or bodies of the Region from establishing ties with foreign political organizations or bodies."

The first attempt to implement the article was foiled by a massive street protest on 1 July 2003, when a half-million people marched through downtown Hong Kong. The law was pulled from consideration after division in the pro-Beijing camp and lost the majority of support in the legislature. China's National People's Congress imposed a national security law with similar language (though without the treason component) on Hong Kong on 30 June 2020, citing its authority under Article 18 of the Basic Law. A second attempt at implementing the article has undergone the legislative process. The bill was officially passed on 19 March 2024 and came into effect on 23 March 2024.

== Content ==
Article 23 of the Basic Law (BL 23) states:

The Hong Kong Special Administrative Region shall enact laws on its own to prohibit any act of treason, secession, sedition, subversion against the Central People's Government, or theft of state secrets, to prohibit foreign political organisations or bodies from conducting political activities in the Region, and to prohibit political organisations or bodies of the Region from establishing ties with foreign political organisations or bodies.

== Background ==
Article 23 had undergone significant revisions before the promulgation of its current form on 4 April 1990. The 1987 version of Article 23 (Article 22 in 1987) was much shorter and only required that

The Hong Kong Special Administrative Region shall prohibit by law any act that damages the national unity or subverts the Central People's Government.

The 1989 February version of Article 23 only contained the first half of the enacted version, with identical wording with the promulgated version up to the phrase “or theft of state secrets”. The consultative committee noted views that Article 23 might affect the freedom of Hong Kong people. It also noted the view that the provision was against the Sino-British Joint Declaration since “it is generally held that the capitalist system is anti-communist and will undermine national unity and subvert the Central People's Government”.

Similar laws had been in force during the British colonial period, but they had not been strictly enforced since 1945. The Emergency Regulations Ordinance (ERO) from the colonial period remains in force, but in 2019 the Court of First Instance ruled that it was "not compatible with the constitutional order laid down by the Basic Law" due to its unchecked and wide scope. The Court of Appeal later varied this by permitting the Prohibition on Face Covering Regulation as reasonable and valid, but stated Emergency Regulations Ordinance regulations were "subject to judicial scrutiny."

Before 1997, the British colonial government introduced the Crimes (Amendment)(No.2) Bill 1996 in an attempt to concretise the concepts of "subversion" and "secession" by confining them to actual violent conduct but of no avail. The bill was voted down in the elected Legislative Council of Hong Kong amid opposition from Beijing and thus left a vacuum in the present legislation.

== 2003 National Security Bill ==
Mainland national security laws do not apply in Hong Kong, by virtue of Article 18 of the Basic Law. As a result, there has been steady pressure from CPG on the HKSAR government to meet its obligations under Article 23. Laws for the purposes of this Article were introduced by the Tung administration in late 2002. In February 2003, the HKSAR government proposed the National Security (Legislative Provisions) Bill 2003 to the Legislative Council which aimed to amend the Crimes Ordinance, the Official Secrets Ordinance and the Societies Ordinance pursuant to the obligation imposed by Article 23 of the Basic Law of the Hong Kong Special Administrative Region of the People's Republic of China and to provide for related, incidental and consequential amendments. The proposed bill caused considerable controversy in Hong Kong and a massive demonstration on 1 July 2003. In the aftermath, Liberal Party chairman James Tien resigned from the Executive Council and the bill was withdrawn after it became clear that it would not get the necessary support from the Legislative Council for it to be passed. The bill was then shelved indefinitely.

== After 2003 ==
There were calls for reintroducing the national security bill after the 2003 setbacks from the pro-Beijing camp occasionally. After the Beijing interpretation of the Basic Law in November 2016 over the Legislative Council oath-taking controversy to eject two pro-independence legislators from the legislature on the basis that "[Beijing] will absolutely neither permit anyone advocating secession in Hong Kong nor allow any pro-independence activists to enter a government institution," Chief executive Leung Chun-ying said Hong Kong would enact Article 23 targeting the pro-independence movement in Hong Kong.

The Director of the Hong Kong Liaison Office Wang Zhimin accused pro-independence activists of "engaging in activities that sought to separate the motherland and subvert the national regime" and urged the Hong Kong government to enact national security legislation as he said "Hong Kong is the only place in the world without a national security legislation – it’s a major weakness in the nation’s overall security, and it has a direct impact on residents." Wang said without a national security law, "Hong Kong independence radicals have been challenging national sovereignty and security in recent years".

Xi Jinping's accession to General Secretary of the Chinese Communist Party, the top position in November 2012, marked a more hardline authoritarian approach, most notably with the construction of Xinjiang re-education camps. The spectre that Hong Kong may similarly be brought to heel became an important element in the democratic protests.

== Protests in 2019 and imposition of security law in 2020 ==
The 2019–20 Hong Kong protests led to an increasing desire within some pro-Beijing lawmakers for Hong Kong to legislate Article 23 of the Basic Law. On 21 May 2020, the Chinese Government proposed a new law on national security regulations that may be enacted in Hong Kong under the provisions of Annex III of its Basic law. It may set up the legal framework to prevent and punish subversion, terrorism, separatism and foreign interference. The following day, a dozen pan-democrat lawmakers marched to the Chinese Liaison Office to show their disapproval.

On 30 June 2020, the mainland 13th National People's Congress and it's Standing Committee imposed the Hong Kong national security law covering secession and subversion under Article 18 of the Basic Law. The areas of treason, sedition and theft of state secrets are not covered by the new Article 18 law, and remain to be implemented under Article 23 by the Hong Kong SAR. On 12 January 2022, Chief Executive Carrie Lam announced at the first session of the new legislature that new "local legislation" would be created to meet the requirements of Article 23.

== Safeguarding National Security Bill ==
On 12 April 2022, Chief Executive John Lee stated that implementing security legislation under Article 23 of the Basic Law would be a top priority for him. Lee later said in July 2022 that he preferred not to rush the law, which some saw as backtracking on his election pledge. The legislation was put on the back burner and was not scheduled for Legislative Council discussion in 2022.

In January 2023, after meeting with Chinese Communist Party officer Xia Baolong, who asked that the Lee administration revise local legislation to keep it aligned with the national security law, Lee said that he would once again prioritize legislation under Article 23 as soon as possible.

Hong Kong's Security Bureau launched a public consultation on Article 23 legislation on 30 January 2024, which ended on 28 February 2024. A draft of the Safeguarding National Security Bill was introduced to the Legislative Council on 8 March 2024, which includes penalties up to life imprisonment for treason, insurrection and incitement of a member of Chinese armed forces to mutiny.

== See also ==
- 2020 Hong Kong national security law
- Internet Article 23
- Macau national security law
- Hong Kong 1 July marches
- Hong Kong independence
- Turkey's Article 301
