= Societies Ordinance =

Legislation of Hong Kong

Legislative Council of Hong Kong
- Long title: An Ordinance to provide for the registration of societies, for the prohibition of the operation of certain societies and for matters related thereto.
- Citation: Cap. 151
- Enacted by: Legislative Council of Hong Kong
- Commenced: 17 November 1911

Legislative history
- Introduced by: Registrar General A. W. Brewin
- First reading: 19 October 1911
- Second reading: 16 November 1911
- Third reading: 16 November 1911

Amended by
- 1915, 1920, 1947, 1949, 1952, 1952, 1956, 1957, 1959, 1961, 1963, 1964, 1970, 1976, 1982, 1988, 1988, 1988, 1991, 1992, 1997
- Status: Current legislation

Societies Ordinance
- Traditional Chinese: 社團條例
- Simplified Chinese: 社团条例
Transcriptions
Standard Mandarin
- Hanyu Pinyin: Shètuán Tiáolì
Yue: Cantonese
- Jyutping: se5 tyun4 tiu4 lai6

The Societies Ordinance is a piece of primary legislation in Hong Kong. Enacted in 1911, it has undergone major revisions. The ordinance regulates both incorporated and unincorporated associations of persons, broadly defined as "societies," and requires their registration, unless they are regulated under a different ordinance or otherwise exempted. In other words, it prohibits informal or secret societies and imposes limits the freedom of association. It also prohibits triad societies and modern successor gangs.

The legislative history of the Societies Ordinance is similar to the Public Order Ordinance. Their roots can be traced to the draconian anti-communist law in Singapore. They were gradually relaxed, up to the 1992 when they were brought in line with international human rights standards by the outgoing government and the second last Legislative Council (1992–1995). Upon Hong Kong handover, the human rights amendments in the 1990s were reverted by the NPCSC of China.

== History ==
=== Colonial period ===
The Societies Ordinance was first introduced in 1911, replacing the Triad and Secret Societies Ordinance 1887 which only control the unlawful societies during the time the criminal activities of the secret societies, notably the Triad Societies flourished, to expand its control on all the societies. The 1911 Ordinance was soon replaced in 1920 which relieved the duty of a society to register, but instead to outlaw the Triad Society and its associated rituals. Moreover, it gave the Governor-in-Council the power to ban any society deemed to be injurious to law and order in Hong Kong.

The registration of a society was reinstated in the 1949 amendment which gave the government extensive powers of supervision. Any association of ten or more persons "whatever its nature or object" was required to register. The words "foreign political organisations" were also mentioned for the first time in the bill in the light of the influx of migrants from the Chinese Civil War between the Nationalists and the Communists. After the 1956 Double Ten Riots which resulted in more than 6,000 arrests, the government introduced amendments that included the extension of the provisions to a society connected with another unlawful society, and allowed the Registrar to rescind the exemption with any society that attempted to politically influence a school.

The Societies Ordinance was under review after the enactment of the 1991 Bill of Rights Ordinance, in the light of the concerns of the Hong Kong people over their civil liberties after Tiananmen Square Massacre of 1989, which had the effect of repealing any previous laws which was inconsistent with it. Major amendments were made to the Societies Ordinance in 1992 which largely relaxed the restriction on the registration of a society.

=== SAR period ===
After the handover of Hong Kong, the 1992 amendments were rolled back by the Beijing-controlled Provisional Legislative Council (PLC) in 1997, which reinstated the provisions of the power of the government to refuse to register a political body "that has a connection with a foreign political organisation" and the requirement to register with the police.

In July 2018, the Hong Kong Police Force issued a notice under the Societies Ordinance to ban the Hong Kong National Party, a pro-independence party, on the basis that the party has engaged in sedition and that the party may be banned on grounds of "national security, public safety, public order, protection of freedom and rights of others." On 24 September 2018, the Hong Kong SAR government officially declared HKNP to be an illegal society and banned the operation of HKNP.

== See also ==
- Hong Kong Basic Law Article 23
- Human rights in Hong Kong
- Public Order Ordinance
- Cardinal Joseph Zen
- Margaret Ng
