= Crimes Ordinance =

Legislation of Hong Kong

Legislative Council of Hong Kong
- Long title: An ordinance to consolidate certain penal enactments.
- Citation: Cap. 200
- Enacted by: Legislative Council of Hong Kong
- Enacted: 22 October 1971

Legislative history
- Introduced by: Attorney General Denys Tudor Emil Roberts
- Introduced: 19 November 1971
- First reading: 3 November 1971
- Second reading: 3 November 1971
- Third reading: 17 November 1971

Related legislation
- Coinage Offences Ordinance 1964; Criminal Intimidation Ordinance 1964; Explosive Substances Ordinance 1966; False Personation Ordinance 1964; Falsification of Documents Ordinance 1964; Forgery Ordinance 1964; Perjury Ordinance 1970; Punishment of Incest Ordinance 1964; Sedition Ordinance 1970
- Status: Amended

The Crimes Ordinance (Cap. 200), last amended in 2024, is a law of Hong Kong relating to certain consolidated penal enactments. Like Macau, penal and criminal law in Hong Kong is generally different from what is applied in China (the National Security Law being a notable exception).

The Crimes Ordinance lists some, but not all, criminal offences in Hong Kong, with other major offences like the Offences against the Person Ordinance (Cap. 212) and Theft Ordinance (Cap. 210) punishing offences against the person and theft respectively.

== History ==
The ordinance consolidated the original Crimes Ordinance of 1971 with several other ordinances:

- Coinage Offences Ordinance (Cap. 204)
- Criminal Intimidation Ordinance (Cap. 205)
- Explosive Substances Ordinance (Cap. 206)
- False Personation Ordinance (Cap. 207)
- Falsification of Documents Ordinance (Cap. 208)
- Forgery Ordinance (Cap. 209)
- Perjury Ordinance (Cap. 214)
- Punishment of Incest Ordinance (Cap. 216)
- Sedition Ordinance (Cap. 217)

== Structure ==
The Crimes Ordinance is structured by Part as follows (this table includes both provisions in force and provisions repealed):

The Crimes Ordinance
Part	Former or current title	Sections	Current status
--	Title	§ 1	In force
~~I~~	~~Treason~~	~~§§ 2 - 5~~	Repealed in 2024
~~II~~	~~Offences Against the Crown~~	~~§§ 6 - 18~~	Repealed in 2024
III	Piracy and Other Offences At Sea	§§ 19A - 23C	In force
IV	Intimidation	§§ 24 - 27	In force
V	Perjury	§§ 28 - 46	In force
VI	Incest	§§ 47 - 51	In force
VII	Explosive Substances	§§ 52 - 58	In force
VIIA	Unmarked Plastic Explosives	§§ 58A - 58G	In force (inserted 1994)
VIII	Criminal Damage to Property	§§ 59 - 67	In force
IX	Forgery and Related Offences	§§ 68 - 83	Partially in force
X	False Certification and Personation	§§ 84 - 94	In force
XI	Counterfeiting and Kindred Offences	§§ 95 - 116	Partially in force
XII	Sexual and Related Offences	§§ 117 - 159	Partially in force
XIIAA	Voyeurism, Unlawful Recording or Observation of Intimate Parts, Related Image Publication Offences and Disposal Order	§§ 159AA - 159AAO	In force (inserted 2021)
XIIA	Preliminary Offences	§§ 159A - 159L	In force (inserted 1996)
XIII	Miscellaneous Offences	§§ 160 and 161	In force (inserted 1979 and 1993 respectively)

The Crimes Ordinance also contains two schedules:

Schedules to the Crimes Ordinance
Schedule	Former or current schedule title	Summary of provisions	Current status
1	Other Offences of which Accused May Be Convicted	Sets out alternative offences for an accused person charged with an offence.	In force.
2	Sexual Offence Provisions That Have Extra-Territorial Effect	Sets out sexual offences for which extraterritorial criminal jurisdiction applies.	In force.

== See also ==
- Legal system of Macau
- Law of Hong Kong

Penal/criminal codes from other parts of China:

- Penal Code of Macau

Penal/criminal codes from similar Common law jurisdictions:

- Crimes Act
- Criminal Code (Canada)
- English Criminal Code
