= List of Hong Kong national security warrants =

The Law of the People's Republic of China on Safeguarding National Security in the Hong Kong Special Administrative Region (National Security Law, or NSL) was imposed by the National People's Congress of China and came into effect on 30 June 2020. A second national security legislation, the Safeguarding National Security Ordinance (National Security Ordinance, SNSO), was enacted by the Legislative Council of Hong Kong to implement Article 23 of Hong Kong's constitution, the Basic Law, and took effect on 23 March 2024. The police operations involving national security elements are conducted by the National Security Department of the Hong Kong Police Force (National Security Department, NSD) in spite of suspected crimes neither related to the NSL nor the national security ordinance.

News of the Hong Kong police pursuing exiled activists first emerged on 31 July 2020 when the Chinese state television CCTV reported on 31 July 2020 that Hong Kong police had issued arrest warrants for six fugitive activists who were suspected of secession or colluding with foreign forces, namely pro-democracy camp's Nathan Law, Simon Cheng, Samuel Chu; localist Ray Wong; and pro-independence Wayne Chan and Honcques Laus. Hong Kong police declined to comment. Chan and Wong were facing charges before their exile, while Law was put on the wanted list by police after he had, without facing charges, left Hong Kong. Chu appeared to be the first non-Hong Kong citizen wanted under the NSL.

The South China Morning Post reported on 27 December 2020 that according to an unnamed insider of the police force, about 30 Hongkongers abroad were wanted by the National Security Department. Four exiled activists were named: Ted Hui, Sunny Cheung, Baggio Leung, and Brian Leung.

Overseas activists, including businessman and commentator Elmer Yuen, journalist Victor Ho, and ex-Legislative Council Member Baggio Leung, who launched a committee to establish a "Hong Kong Parliament" in exile were accused of subversion by Hong Kong's Security Bureau on 3 August 2022. The Bureau said the police "would spare no efforts" in accordance with national security legislation, "in order to bring the offenders to justice". The Hong Kong Parliament Electoral Organizing Committee, based in Toronto, Canada, was launched in July 2022, aiming to hold the first election of the parliament in late 2023, with a spokesperson saying that the vote would be held "globally" and online.

The Trump administration sanctioned six security and police officials in Hong Kong after Beijing and Hong Kong were accused of using security law "to intimidate, silence, and harass 19 pro-democracy activists who were forced to flee overseas".

== Confirmed warrants ==
The NSD announced on 3 July 2023 that arrest warrants were issued for eight self-exiled activists: activists Nathan Law, Anna Kwok and Finn Lau, former lawmakers Dennis Kwok and Ted Hui, lawyer Kevin Yam, unionist Mung Siu-tat, and online commentator Elmer Yuen. The Force, citing article 37 and 38 of the NSL which states that the legislation applies to everyone in the world and covers offences committed outside the city, also offered HK$1 million for each of the wanted people. Chief Executive John Lee said the eight would be "pursued for life" and urged them to give themselves up, otherwise they would spend their days in fear. Lee also denounced the eight as "rats in the street" and urged everyone to avoid all contact with them.

In response to the bounty placed, Yam vowed to continue to speak out against the crackdown and the "tyranny". Hui said "the bounty ... makes it clearer to the western democracies that China is going towards more extreme authoritarianism." Anna Kwok, in Washington, said she would not back down. Finn Lau, based in London, said the reward was motivated by the fact that many democratic countries had suspended extradition treaties with Hong Kong. Nathan Law, who obtained refugee status in the UK, said he needed to be "more careful" about divulging his whereabouts as a result of the bounty, but called on Hongkongers not to cooperate, nor to be intimidated or live in fear.

On 3 July, the United States condemned the move for setting "a dangerous precedent that threatens the human rights and fundamental freedoms of people all over the world." British Foreign Secretary James Cleverly criticised the arrest warrants and said his government "will not tolerate any attempts by China to intimidate and silence individuals in the UK and overseas". Australian Prime Minister Anthony Albanese said it was "unacceptable" that Hong Kong has put bounties on two Australian residents. A spokesperson for the Chinese embassy in the UK on 3 July accused British politicians of having "openly offered protection for fugitives".

At a press conference on 14 December, police said that they had issued arrest warrants pertaining to national security charges against five further overseas activists, with the same offer of HK$1 million for each of the wanted: Simon Cheng, Frances Hui, Joey Siu, Johnny Fok, and Tony Choi. Police said the five activists "who have already fled overseas, have continued to commit the offence[s] under the national security law that seriously endanger national security". Policed added that Fok and Choi, of YouTube channel Tuesdayroad Media, were involved in a case related to false claims of helping young protesters flee, and scammed them and their family members out of hundreds of thousands of dollars.

Six more were placed with bounty on 24 December 2024, including former pollster Joseph Tay and former actor Joe Tay, marking the third round of arrest warrants issued. Five of them were accused of "inciting secession" and "colluding with foreign forces" through speeches or posts. They had allegedly requested sanctions against Hong Kong judges and prosecutors and security officials related to the domestic security law. Carman Lau and Chung Kim-wah were named for allegedly lobbying to revoke Hong Kong overseas traded offices' privileges; Chloe Cheung had allegedly asked foreign countries to issue warnings about the growing risks of conducting business in the city. The sixth activist, Victor Ho, was accused of subversion for leading efforts to create Hong Kong Parliament, a legislature-in-exile.

On 25 July 2025, Hong Kong national security police issued arrest warrants against 15 overseas Hongkongers and announced bounties of HKD$200,000 being placed on each of them, for their involvement in the same organisation, Hong Kong Parliament, that authorities had deemed subversive earlier. The police also re-issued warrants against Elmer Yuen, Victor Ho, Tony Choi, and Johnny Fok for subversion. This came after the arrest of Hong Kong Democratic Independence Union members earlier, which some of the fifteen wanted were members of.

=== Relatives probed ===
As of mid-January 2024, at least 39 relatives and friends of the eight who were bountied in the first batch were briefly detained by the police in the following months, including seven arrested. Local media said pursuing those on the bounty list is "state-assigned task", although they would very unlikely surrender to the authorities. However, government allies believed detaining relatives can exert pressure on exiled activists to stop their advocacies.

On 11 July 2023, according to local media, parents and the elder brother of Nathan Law were brought away for questioning and then released. His sister-in-law was taken for questioning on 19 August, according to local media; also according to local media, the taking away by police of another woman the previous day had been on suspicion of her being linked to the defunct Demosisto party Law had co-founded. Seven party colleagues were arrested and three related were probed in the Mee App case, thereby accumulating a total of 14 persons questioned in Law's case.

Christopher Mung's elder brother, sister-in-law and nephew were detained on 18 July. On 20 July, the parents of Dennis Kwok, Dennis's elder brother Michael Kwok Wing-chun and Michael's wife were also probed. Elmer Yuen's children, ex-party chairwoman of pro-democracy People Power Erica Yuen and Derek Yuen were brought away on 24 July. Derek's wife, pro-Beijing lawmaker Eunice Yung was historically investigated as well. Stephanie Downs, ex-wife of Elmer Yuen, Downs's son Paul Yuen and daughter Madeline Yuen were brought to the police on 4 August. Anna Kwok's parents were targeted on 8 August, followed by her two elder brothers on 22 August. Ted Hui's in-laws, including his father-in-law, mother-in-law, and brother-in-law, were all questioned on 12 September.

As Agnes Chow failed to report to the police after she announced fleeing to Canada, Chow's parents were questioned by the police in late December 2023. This was followed by the probes into the new five wanted activists. Simon Cheng's parents, as well as his two elder sisters, were all questioned on 10 January 2024. Frances Hui's mother reportedly was taken away for questioning on 11 January 2024. Chung Kim-wah's wife, son, and his three siblings were questioned by national security police in January 2025. Carmen Lau's uncle and aunt reportedly were taken away for questioning on 10 February. Frances Hui's parents were taken in for questioning on 10 April, which was the second time in the case of her mother. Tony Chung's stepfather was also brought to the police station.

On 30 April 2025, Anna Kwok's father and brother were arrested by authorities for attempting to handle the wanted activist's finances, see the separate section below.

Name	Age	Accused of	Status	Announced
Ted Hui Chi-fung	41	Inciting secession, collusion, inciting subversion	Wanted Specified "absconder" Hong Kong passport cancelled	3 July 2023
Anna Kwok Fung-yee	26	Collusion	Wanted Specified "absconder" Hong Kong passport cancelled	3 July 2023
Elmer Yuen Gong-yi	74	Collusion, subversion	Wanted Specified "absconder" Hong Kong passport cancelled	3 July 2023
Dennis Kwok Wing-hang	45	Collusion	Wanted Specified "absconder" Hong Kong passport cancelled	3 July 2023
Kevin Yam Kin-fung	46	Collusion	Wanted Specified "absconder" Hong Kong passport cancelled	3 July 2023
Nathan Law Kwun-chung	29	Inciting secession, collusion	Wanted Specified "absconder" Hong Kong passport cancelled	3 July 2023
Christopher Mung Siu-tat	51	Inciting secession	Wanted Specified "absconder" Hong Kong passport cancelled	3 July 2023
Finn Lau Cho-dick	29	Collusion	Wanted Specified "absconder" Hong Kong passport cancelled	3 July 2023
Frances Hui Wing-ting	24	Collusion	Wanted Specified "absconder" Hong Kong passport cancelled	14 December 2023
Joey Siu Lam	24	Collusion	Wanted Specified "absconder" Hong Kong passport cancelled	14 December 2023
Tony Choi Ming-da	46	Inciting secession, inciting subversion, subversion (Note: Bounty for subversion issued on 25 July 2025.)	Wanted Specified "absconder" Hong Kong passport cancelled	14 December 2023
Johnny Fok Ka-chi	42	Inciting secession, inciting subversion, subversion	Wanted Specified "absconder" Hong Kong passport cancelled	14 December 2023
Simon Cheng Man-kit	32	Inciting secession, collusion	Wanted Specified "absconder" Hong Kong passport cancelled	14 December 2023
Victor Ho Leung-mau	69	Subversion	Wanted Specified "absconder" Hong Kong passport cancelled	24 December 2024
Chan Lai-chun	66	Subversion	Wanted Specified "absconder" Hong Kong passport cancelled	25 July 2025
Tsang Wai-fan	65	Subversion	Wanted Specified "absconder" Hong Kong passport cancelled	25 July 2025
Chin Po-fun	65	Subversion	Wanted Specified "absconder" Hong Kong passport cancelled	25 July 2025
Paul Ha Hoi-chun	60	Subversion	Wanted Specified "absconder" Hong Kong passport cancelled	25 July 2025
Hau Chung-yu	31	Subversion	Wanted Specified "absconder" Hong Kong passport cancelled	25 July 2025
Ho Wing-yau	57	Subversion	Wanted Specified "absconder" Hong Kong passport cancelled	25 July 2025
Keung Ka-wai	34	Subversion	Wanted Specified "absconder" Hong Kong passport cancelled	25 July 2025
Tony Lam	36	Subversion	Wanted Specified "absconder" Hong Kong passport cancelled	25 July 2025
Agnes Ng	28	Subversion	Wanted Specified "absconder" Hong Kong passport cancelled	25 July 2025
Wong Chun-wah	53	Subversion	Wanted Specified "absconder" Hong Kong passport cancelled	25 July 2025
Wong Sau-wo	25	Subversion	Wanted Specified "absconder" Hong Kong passport cancelled	25 July 2025
Feng Chongyi	64	Subversion	Wanted Specified "absconder"	25 July 2025
Sasha Gong	69	Subversion	Wanted Specified "absconder"	25 July 2025
Ng Man-yan	77	Subversion	Wanted Specified "absconder"	25 July 2025
Zhang Xinyan	54	Subversion	Wanted Specified "absconder"	25 July 2025
Joseph Tay	62	Inciting secession, collusion	Wanted	24 December 2024
Chung Kim-wah	64	Inciting secession, collusion	Wanted	24 December 2024
Carmen Lau Ka-men	29	Inciting secession, collusion	Wanted	24 December 2024
Tony Chung Hon-lam	23	Inciting secession, collusion	Wanted	24 December 2024
Chloe Cheung Hei-ching	19	Inciting secession, collusion	Wanted	24 December 2024

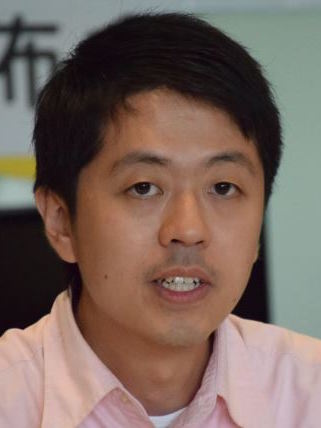
Ted Hui

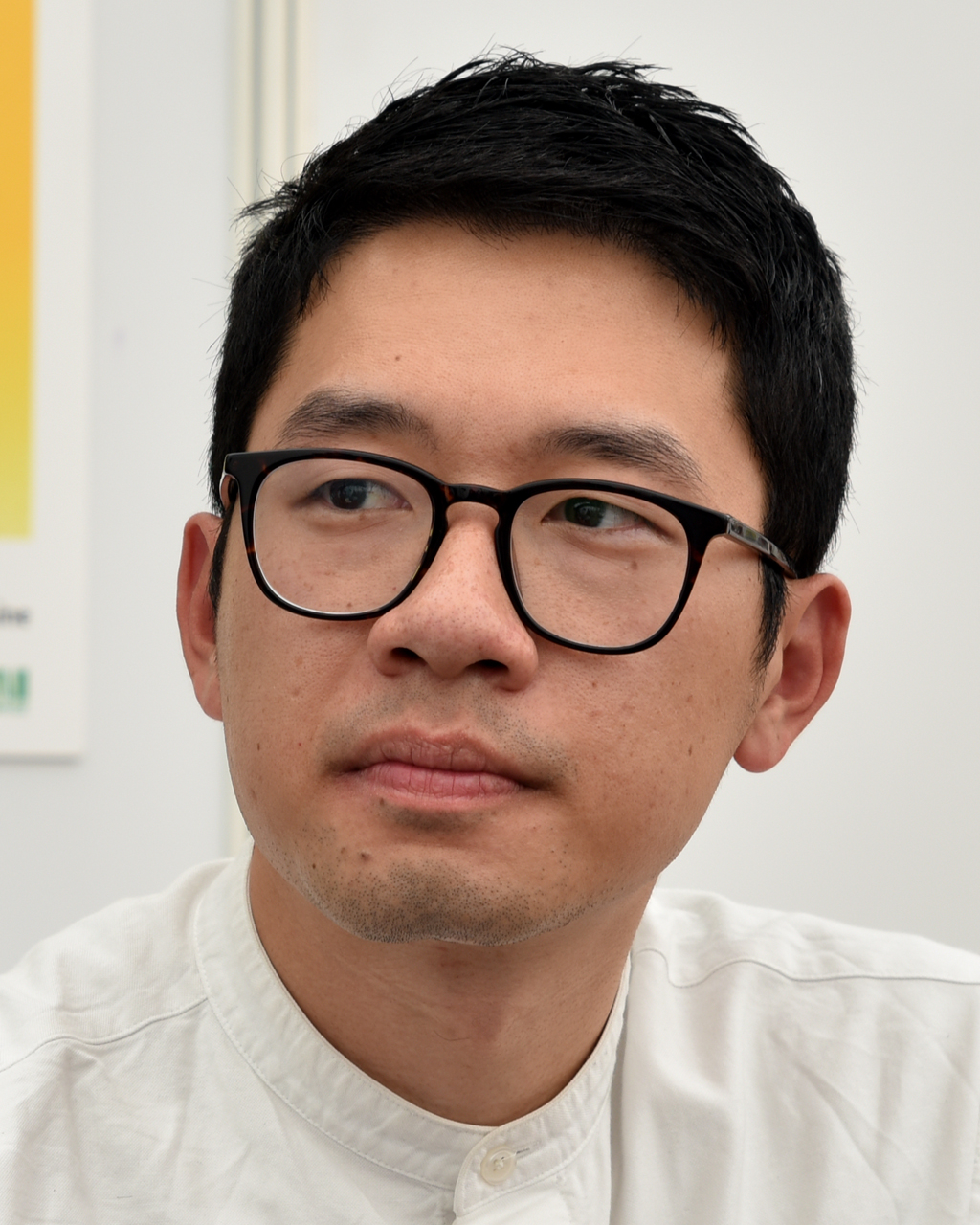
Nathan Law

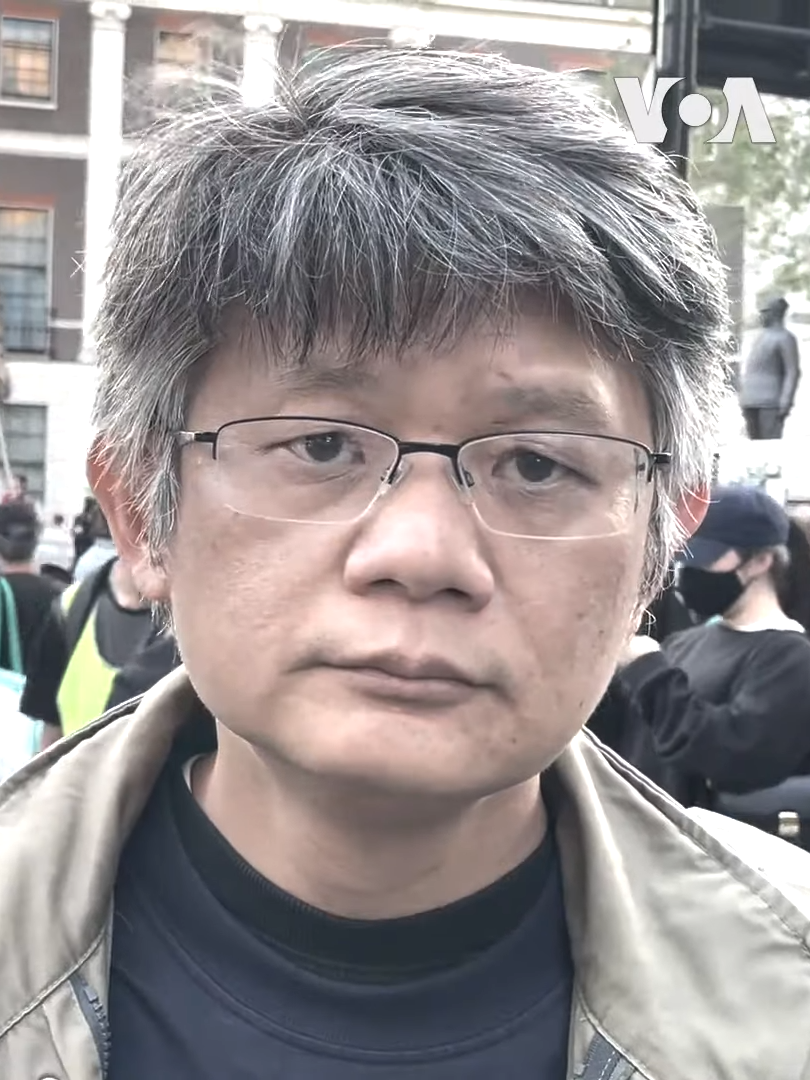
Mung Siu-tat

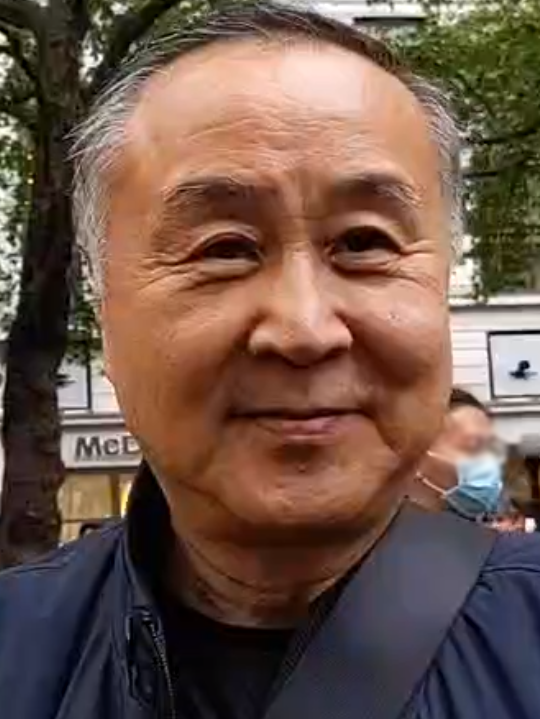
Elmer Yuen

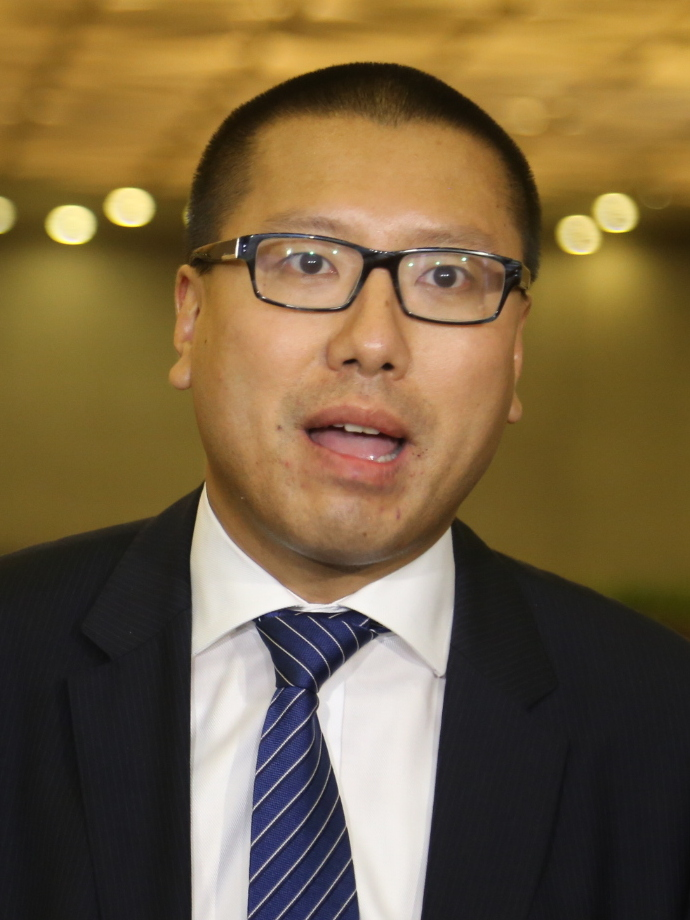
Kevin Yam

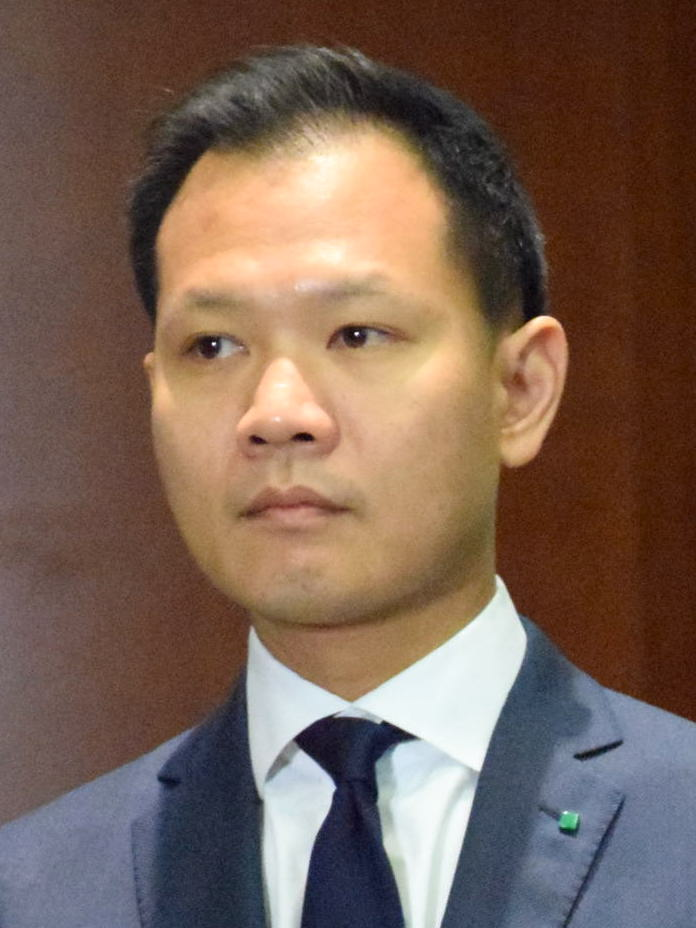
Dennis Kwok

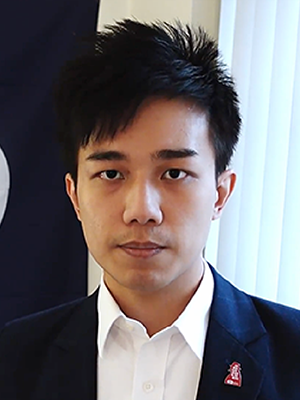
Finn Lau

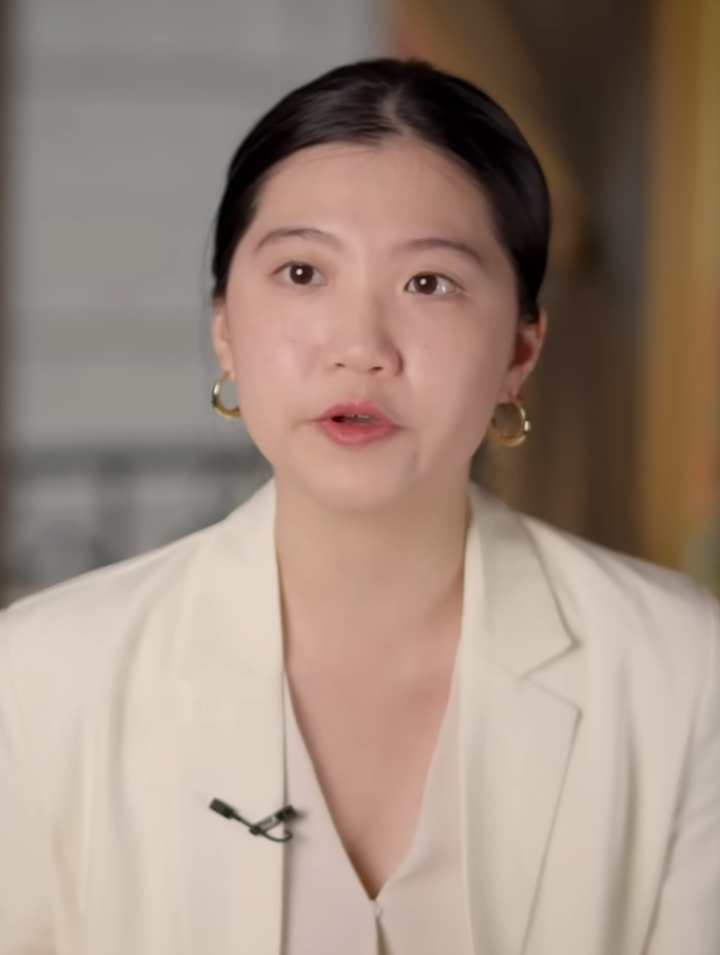
Anna Kwok

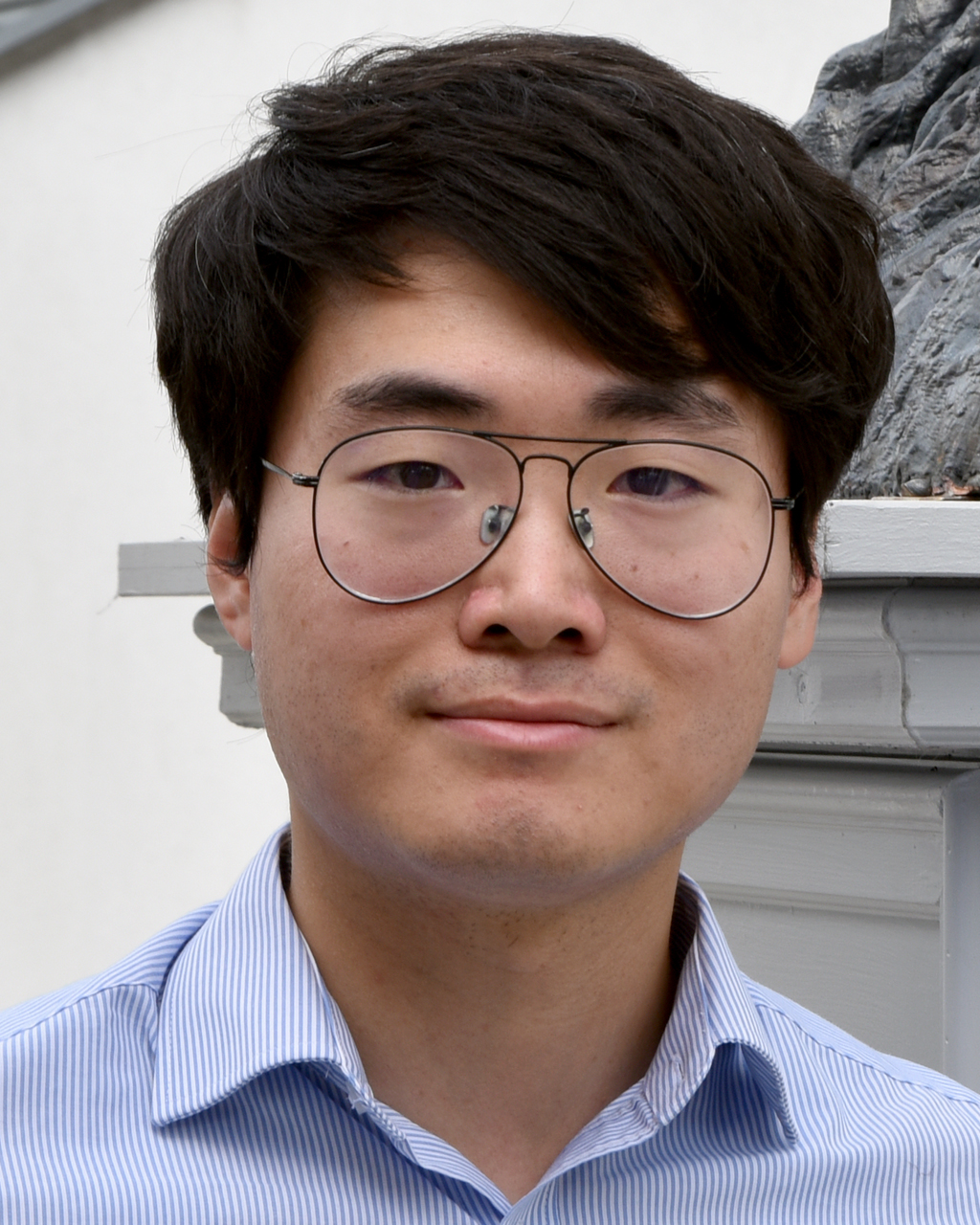
Simon Cheng

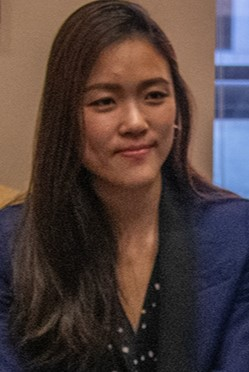
Frances Hui

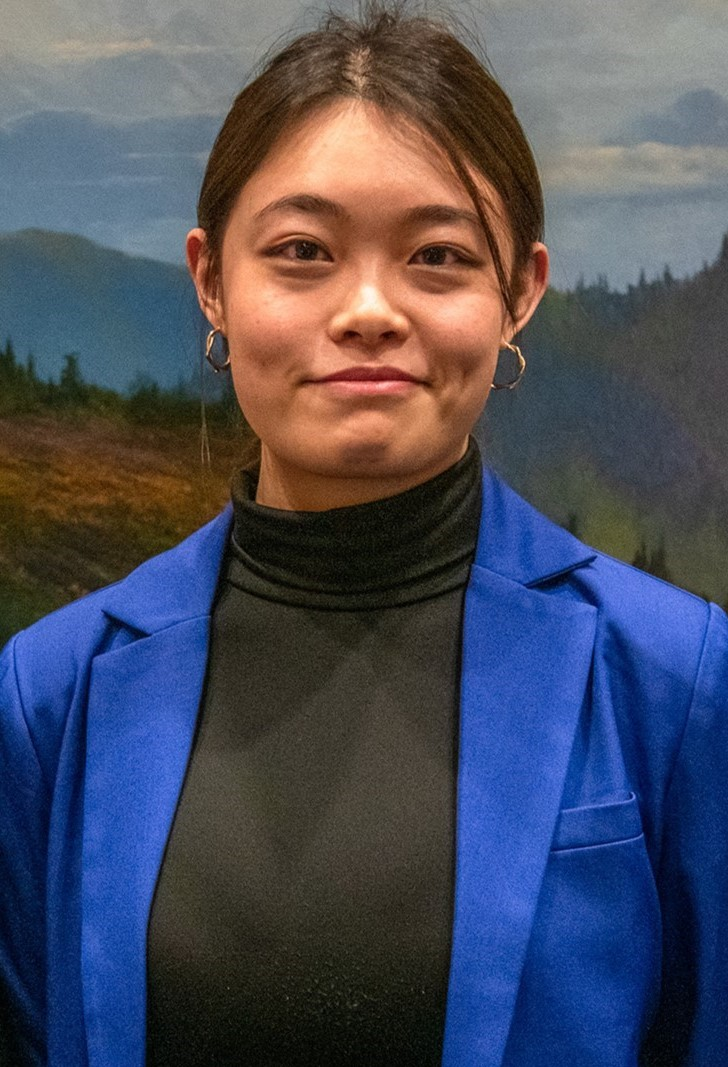
Joey Siu

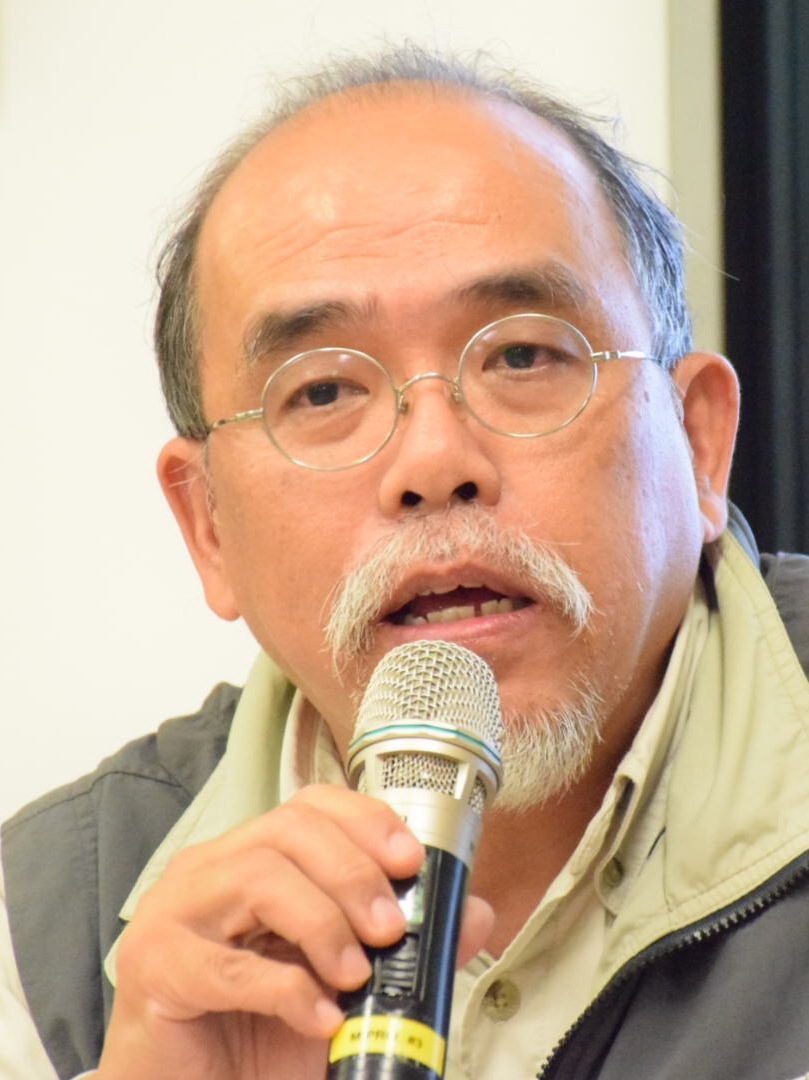
Chung Kim-wah

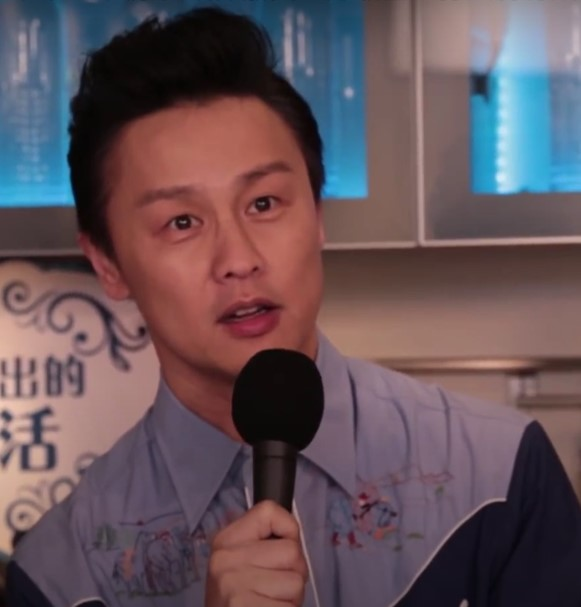
Joseph Tay

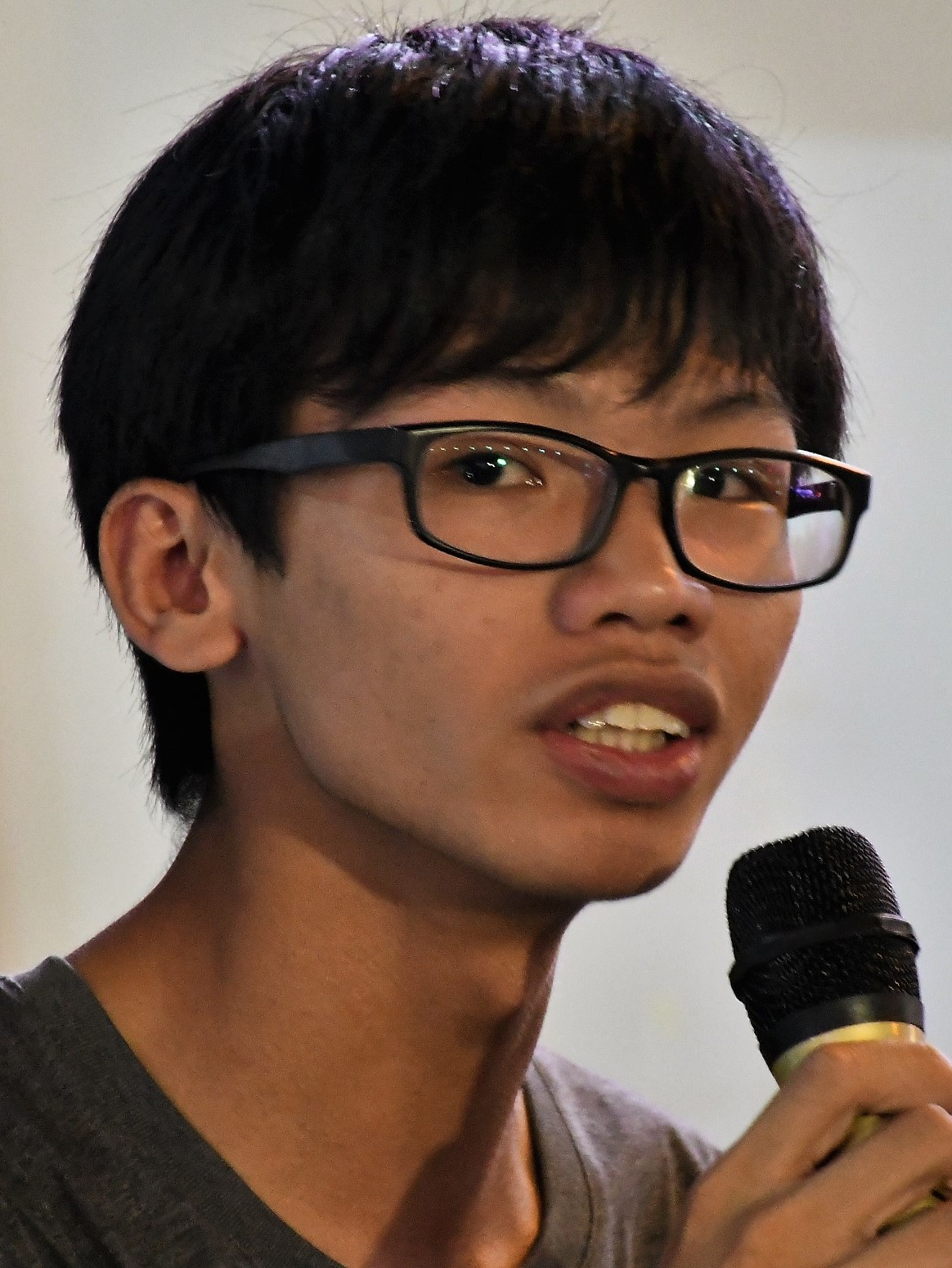
Tony Chung

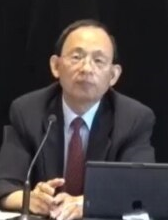
Victor Ho

== Reported warrants ==
Name	Age	Accused of	Status	First reported
Wayne Chan Ka-kui	30	Inciting secession, collusion	Reportedly wanted	31 July 2020
Ray Wong Toi-yeung	26	Inciting secession, collusion	Reportedly wanted	31 July 2020
Honcques Laus	18	Inciting secession, collusion	Reportedly wanted	31 July 2020
Samuel Chu Muk-man (Note: First non-Hong Kong resident wanted under the NSL)	42	Inciting secession, collusion	Reportedly wanted	31 July 2020
Sunny Cheung Kwan-yang	24	Inciting secession, collusion	Reportedly wanted	27 December 2020
Sixtus "Baggio" Leung Chung-hang	34	Inciting secession, collusion	Reportedly wanted	27 December 2020
Brian Leung Kai-ping	26	Inciting secession, collusion	Reportedly wanted	27 December 2020
Agnes Chow Ting	27	Collusion	Reportedly wanted	29 December 2023
