= Frances Hui =

Hong Kong social activist (born 1999)

Frances Hui Wing-ting
- 許穎婷
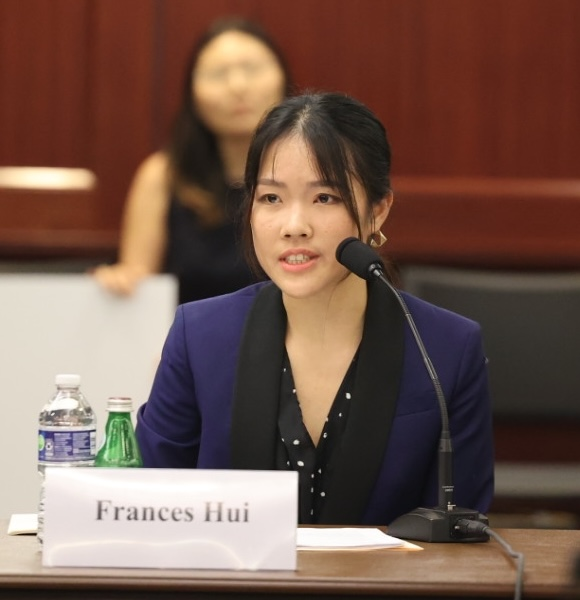
- Frances Hui testifies at the House Select Committee on the Chinese Communist Party roundtable titled "The Future of Hong Kong: U.S. Policy Going Forward" on May 23, 2024.
- Born: 30 September 1999 (age 26); Hong Kong
- Education: Our Lady's College, Hong Kong; Emerson College
- Occupation: Social activist
- Employer: We The Hongkongers Committee for Freedom in Hong Kong Foundation

Chinese name
- Traditional Chinese: 許穎婷
- Simplified Chinese: 許穎婷
Transcriptions
Standard Mandarin
- Hanyu Pinyin: Xǔ Yǐngtíng
Yue: Cantonese
- Jyutping: Heoi^{2} Wing^{6} ting^{4}

Frances Hui Wing-ting (Chinese: 許穎婷; born 30 September 1999) is a Hong Kong social activist, director of We The Hongkongers, policy and advocacy manager for the Committee for Freedom in Hong Kong Foundation and a former member of the Scholarism movement. She announced her exile to the United States after the implementation of the Hong Kong National Security Law. In December 2023, the National Security Department of the Hong Kong Police issued a bounty of HK$1 million for her arrest.

She studied at Our Lady's College in Hong Kong and studied journalism at Emerson College in Boston, Massachusetts. She rose to prominence after writing an article for Emerson College's student newspaper titled, "I am from Hong Kong, not China" in April 2019.

== Career ==
On 23 May 2015, Hui criticized then Chief Executive of Hong Kong, Leung Chun-ying and opposed the Hong Kong Government's proposed political reform plan at a public hearing of the Hong Kong Legislative Council.

On 2 April 2019, she wrote an article for Emerson College's campus publication Berkeley Beacon titled, "I am from Hong Kong, Not China", detailing the differences between Hong Kong and mainland China, pointing out that Hong Kong under "One Country, Two Systems", enjoys basic human rights such as freedom of speech, freedom of press and publication, and freedom of assembly granted by the Basic Law. At the same time, the article also criticized the lack of communication channels between minority groups in Hong Kong, Taiwan, Tibet and Xinjiang, expressed her disapproval of the university's adoption of 'Hong Kong, China,' and reiterated that she would firmly protect the identity of the people of Hong Kong.

On 8 June 2019, Hui posted a video to oppose the Fugitive Offenders Amendment Bill proposed by then Secretary for Security John Lee on behalf of the Hong Kong Government and claimed that if it were passed, Hong Kong's human rights problems would worsen and she would not have the courage to return to the city.

In an interview with Xia News on 5 December 2019, Hui said that she was not displeased with mainland China or Chinese identity from the beginning. The turning point in supporting Hong Kong independence was the 2014 Umbrella Revolution and the 2019 extradition bill protests.

On 10 March 2020, Hui launched We The Hong Kongers, an organization for Hong Kong people in the United States, and called on all Hong Kongers living in the United States to fill in the identity of "Hong Kong people" in the racial column of the 2020 US Census. She believes that the answer will not only help the US federal government more accurately assess the needs of Hong Kong people, such as providing more support for Cantonese services, but more importantly will reflect the cultural identity of the Hong Kong people and help promote the lobbying work of Hong Kong people in the US Congress.

On 1 November 2020, twelve members of We The Hongkongers were detained for more than 70 days by the Hong Kong Police. Hui and the movement's supporters in Hong Kong and abroad recorded a short video to draw international attention to the incident.

On 17 December 2020, she announced her exile in a post on her personal social media, saying that she was born a Hong Konger and will die with the soul of Hong Kong.

On 14 April 2022, Hui announced that she had been granted political asylum in the United States, becoming the first person from Hong Kong to be granted political asylum by the United States federal government.

On 14 December 2023, the National Security Department of the Hong Kong Police issued a bounty of HK$1 million for the arrest of five overseas Hong Kong social activists including Hui, Joey Siu, Simon Cheng, Kenneth Fok, and Cai Mingda, sparking international criticism. The US State Department condemned the Chinese Communist Party (CCP) for ignoring international norms of democracy and human rights, and pointed out that the Hong Kong government has no jurisdiction within the United States. American Congressmen Raja Krishnamoorthi and Mike Gallagher stated that "defenders of democracy and freedom will continue to enjoy the protection of the liberties and rights guaranteed in the United States Constitution." In addition, several members of the United States Congress from all parties issued a statement saying that it was unacceptable for the Hong Kong SAR government to be controlled by the CCP and to use intimidation and harassment to persecute American citizens and residents who engage in peaceful political activities in the United States. Stressing the need for the US Congress to take urgent action to address the CCP's transnational repression, Krishnamoorthi and Gallagher called on the US federal government to immediately sanction the CCP and Hong Kong officials responsible for the execution of the search warrant.

On 24 December 2024, the Hong Kong government canceled the Hong Kong passports of Hui and six other Hong Kong activists based overseas under Hong Kong Basic Law Article 23.
