= Buddhist Mau Fung Memorial College =

Hong Kong secondary school

Coordinates: 22.45582°N 114.00787°E

佛教茂峰法師紀念中學 Buddhist Mau Fung Memorial College
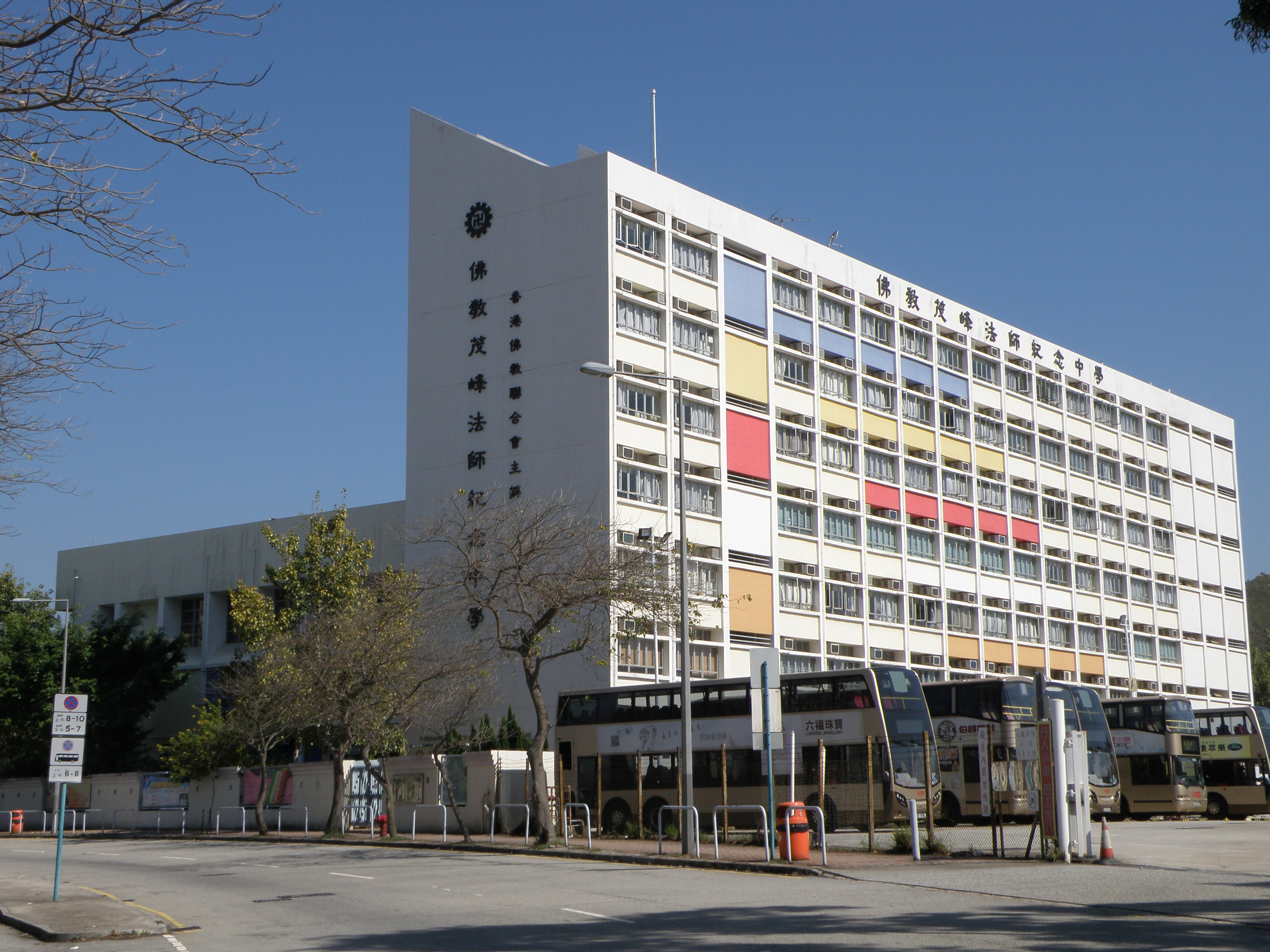

Location
- No. 18 Tin Pak Road, Tin Shui Wai; New Territories, Hong Kong

Information
- Type: Subsidised School
- Motto: 明智顯悲
- Established: 1998
- School district: Yuen Long District
- Principal: Mr. Liu Man-lee
- Teaching staff: 66 (not including principal）
- Grades: Secondary 1 to 6
- Enrollment: Approximately 1,000
- Affiliation: Hong Kong Buddhist Association
- Website: http://www.bmf.edu.hk/

Buddhist Mau Fung Memorial College (Chinese: 佛教茂峰法師紀念中學) is a co-ed Hong Kong secondary school located in Tin Shui Wai, New Territories. It uses Chinese as the medium of instruction for all subjects except English class.

== Principals ==
No.	Principals	Year
1.	陳燕輝 (Mr Chan Yin-fai)	1998–2012
2.	陳志維 (Mr Chan Chi-wai)	2012–2021
3.	廖萬里 (Mr Liu Man-lee)	2021–2021

== Notable alumni ==
- Tony Chung – activist
- Kirby Lam Sau Yi – actress

== Events ==
July 10, 2003, Mr. Li Bing Hang, a mathematics teacher at the school, was killed in a double-decker bus accident on Tuen Mun Roada major bus accident on Tuen Mun Road. In response, the school held a memorial event.Article 1. Article 2.

November 10, 2011, during the visit of the USS George Washington aircraft carrier to Hong Kong, 20 visiting U.S. Navy personnel toured the campus and engaged in exchanges with teachers and students.

From May 31 to June 4, 2024, the school’s team excelled at the "Infomatrix International Student Information and Communication Technology Competition 2024" held in Bucharest, Romania, winning both gold and silver awards among numerous participating teams. Additionally, from July 29 to August 5 of the same year, the school’s marching band and Chinese drum team stood out in the Indonesia Drum Corps International Championship, securing two awards: "Best Favorite SoundSport International Band" and "Best Favorite Street Parade International Band" among over 40 international participating teams.

== See also ==
- List of secondary schools in Hong Kong
