= Brian Leung Kai-ping =

Hong Kong activist and scholar

- 梁繼平
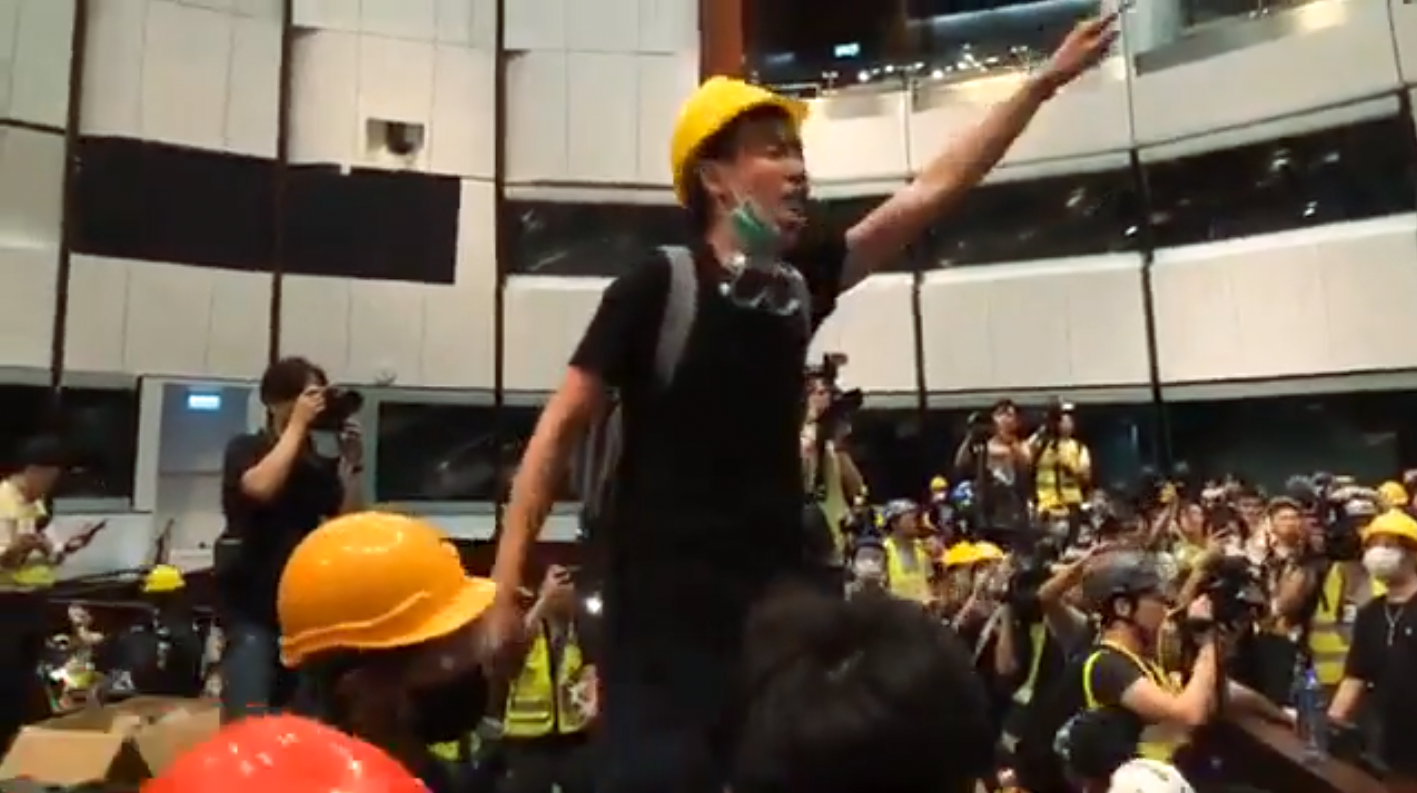
- Leung in 2019 when storming the Legislative Council
- Born: 21 June 1994 (age 31); Hong Kong
- Education: University of Hong Kong; University of Washington
- Occupation: Activist
- Known for: Hong Kong Nationalism; Storming of the Legislative Council Complex
- Movement: Hong Kong localism

Brian Leung Kai-ping (Chinese: 梁繼平; born 21 June 1994) is a Hong Kong localism scholar and critic. Former editor-in-chief of Undergrad, the official magazine of the Hong Kong University Students' Union, Leung was known for editing Hong Kong Nationalism, a book that was denounced by the government for promoting separatism. He later fled to the United States after storming the Legislative Council Complex in 2019 and calling for democratization in Hong Kong.

== Early career ==
In his early years, he studied at Pok Oi Hospital Chan Kwok Wai Primary School and Carmel Divine Grace Foundation Secondary School.

Leung read political science and law at the University of Hong Kong. In 2013, he became the editor-in-chief of Undergrad, the official magazine of the Hong Kong University Students' Union. Undergrad published Hong Kong Nationalism in September 2014, which contained the article Relaxing Social Security Eligibility and Localism Politics written by Leung. He graduated from the University of Hong Kong with a double degree in and went to Sciences Po in Paris as an exchange student.

== Political activist ==
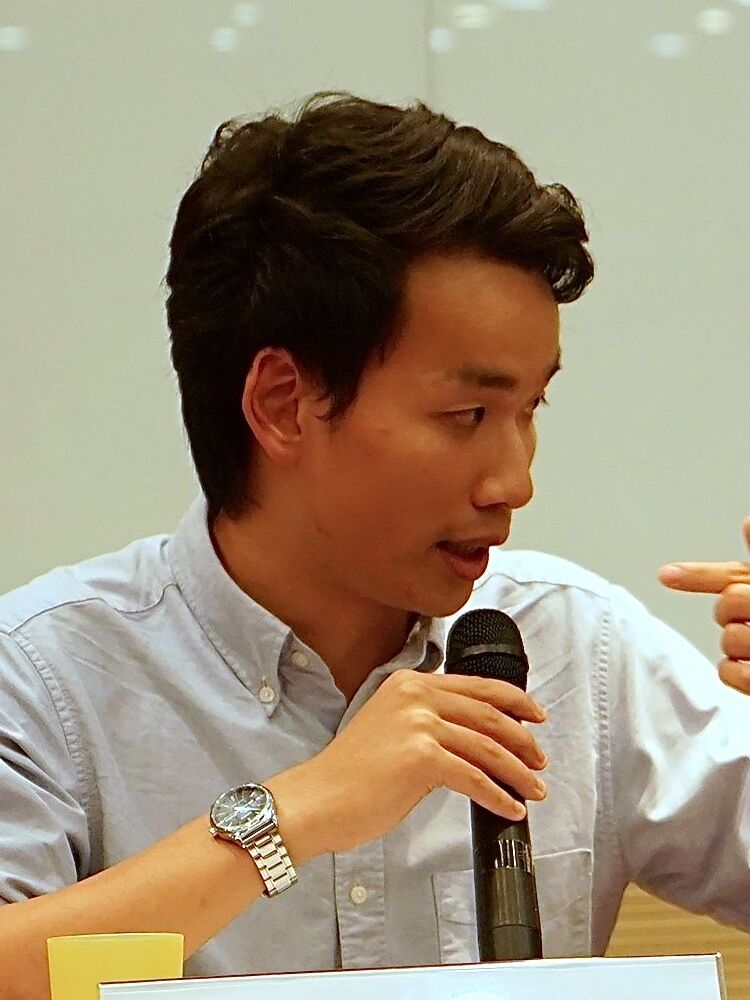
Leung in 2016

Leung had participated in the Umbrella Revolution as early as 2014.

Leung was one of the protestors that stormed the Legislative Council Complex on the evening of 1 July 2019, and was the only demonstrator who lowered his mask and issued the "Hong Kong People's Declaration of Resistance" and shouted "Hongkongers cannot lose ever again". The South China Morning Post reported on 5 July that Leung said he had no regrets about showing his true colors that night. In September 2019, Leung and Joshua Wong attended the Hong Kong People's Forum in New York to speak about the Anti-Extradition Law Amendment Bill Movement.

Leung, who left Hong Kong for the State of Washington, United States, confirmed on social media that he received the police summons in January 2020 and was charged with "entering or staying in the conference hall." In an interview with Deutsche Welle in June 2020, he was surprised to learn that he had been charged with "rioting" by the Hong Kong Police. As of 2024, Leung was studying for his PhD in political science at the University of Washington.

According to a report on 27 December 2020, he was wanted by the National Security Department for violating the Hong Kong National Security Law.
