= Hong Kong Nationalism =

2014 book

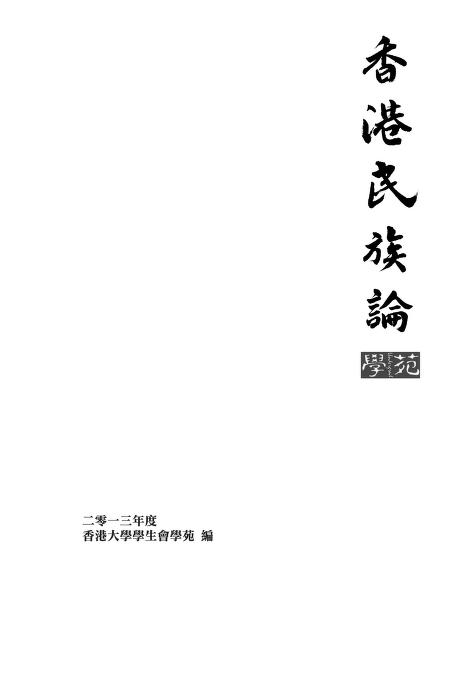
- Editor: Undergrad of Hong Kong University Students' Union, Session 2013
- Original title: 香港民族論
- Cover artist: Leung Wan-him (梁允謙)
- Language: Chinese
- Genre: Political science
- Published: September 2014
- Publisher: Hong Kong University Students' Union
- Publication place: Hong Kong
- Pages: 172
- ISBN: 978-988-13631-0-7

Hong Kong Nationalism (Chinese: 香港民族論; lit. 'Theory of the Hong Kong Nation') is a book published in September 2014 by the Hong Kong University Students' Union. Edited by the Undergrad, the official magazine of the union, it compiled nine articles from students, scholars and commentators and argued the necessity of nationalism in Hong Kong.

The book became well known a few months later after then Chief Executive Leung Chun-ying openly criticised it for promoting Hong Kong independence. The book was considered to be banned following the national security law since 2020.

== Background ==
Localism was on the rise as Occupy Central with Love and Peace initiative was gaining momentum after the announcement in March 2013. Undergrad wrote two months later that the movement "must be Hong Kong-oriented". It urged Hongkongers to give up Greater Chinese nationalism and the belief that China would be democratized.

According to an opinion poll conducted at the University of Hong Kong, which was subsequently published in the February 2014 issue of Undergrad, 37% of the 467 interviewed students expressed support to a hypothetical independence referendum even though it would not be recognised by the Chinese government, and 42% supported if it would be recognised. That issue, known as "Hong Kong nation's self-determination of fate" (香港民族、命運自決), (Note: The Hong Kong government translated the title as "Hong Kong people deciding their own fate") urged for bolstering localism which would be the only path for Hongkongers' resistance.

If we believe Hong Kong should be a place different from mainland and with the freedom of speech, then we would naturally be free to propose and advocate for Hong Kong independence.

Five essays were compiled into the same issue by the student editors. Except one that expressed doubt on the notion of Hong Kong nation, that issue would later be expanded and became Hong Kong Nationalism, after adding five essays by scholars and commentators, including an associate professor from Johns Hopkins University, following the remaining four articles which were amended amidst the Sunflower Student Movement.

The book was published in September 2014. In the same month, the Undergrad slammed the Occupy Central leaders for kowtowing to Chinese Communist Party, and believed a new democracy movement would be to align with Hong Kong independence.

== List of essays ==
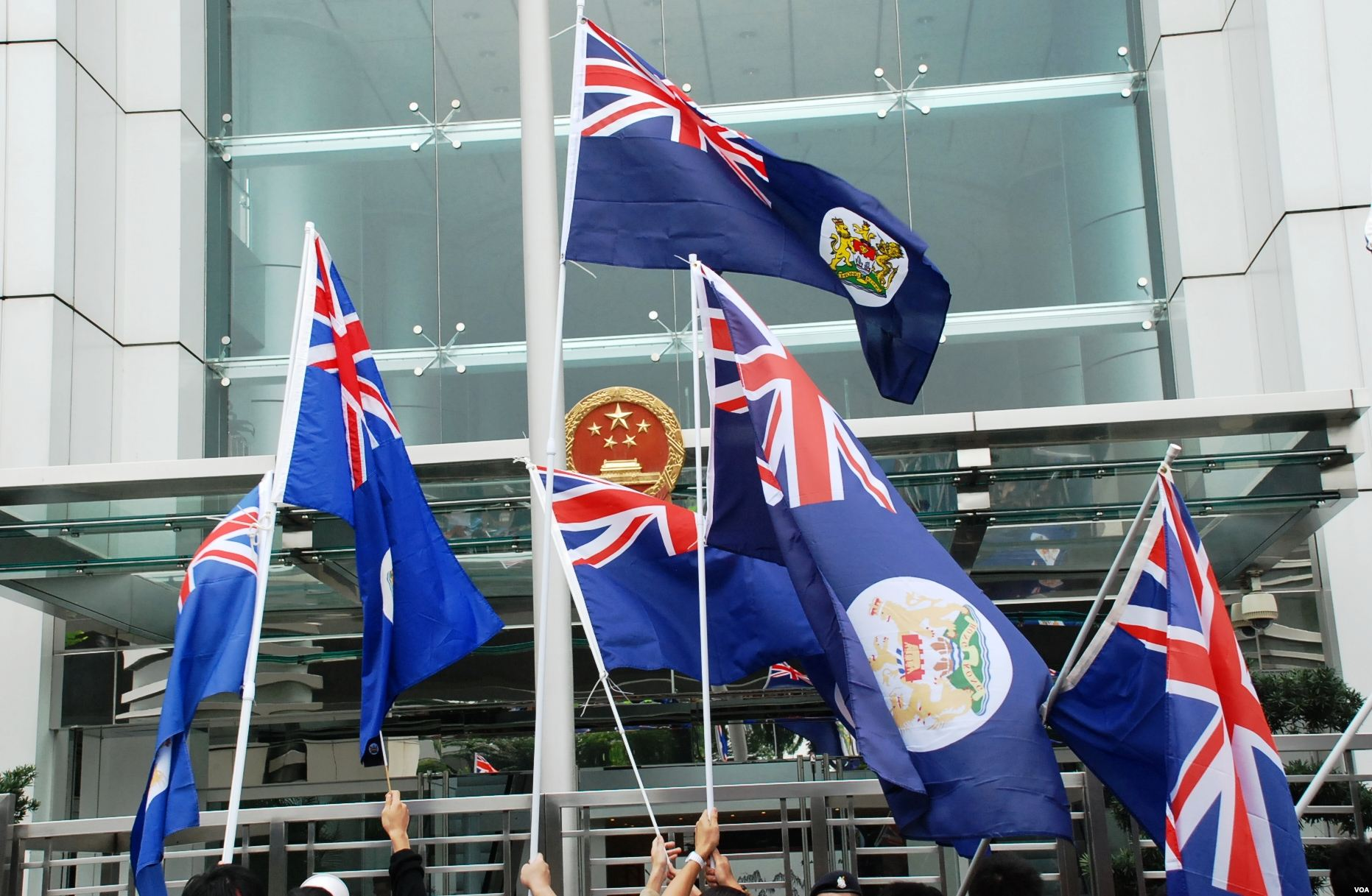
Protesters waving Hong Kong colonial flag outside the Chinese Hong Kong Liaison Office in 2019

The original four articles written by student editors are –

- Relaxing Social Security Eligibility and Localism Politics (Note: 綜援撤限爭議與本土政治共同體) by Brian Leung Kai-ping, chief editor of Undergrad

Written in response to the Court of Final Appeal's ruling that lowers the requirement for the Comprehensive Social Security Assistance Scheme from seven-year residence to one-year, prompting concerns of significant increase in welfare expenditure by Chinese immigrants.

- Localism is the Only Way Out for Hongkongers' Resistance (Note: 本土意識是港人抗爭的唯一出路) by Wong Chun-kit (王俊杰), deputy chief editor of Undergrad
- The Whole Cultural System is what behind Hongkongers (Note: 香港人的背後是整個文化體系) by Jamie Cho Hiu-nok (曹曉諾)
- Should Hong Kong Have the Rights of Nations to Self-determination (Note: 香港是否應有民族自決的權利？) by Jack Li Kai-tik (李啟迪)

The additional five articles are –

- The Lilliputian Dream: Thoughts on Hong Kong Nationalism (Note: The Lilliputian Dream：關於香港民族主義的思考筆記) by Wu Rwei-ren (吳叡人), Taiwanese historian
- Discussion with Undergrad Students on Hongkongers and the Identity (Note: 與學苑同學談香港人和香港人意識) by Lian Yi-zheng (練乙錚), Hong Kong journalist
- A Rump Nation and a Self-determined City-state (Note: 殘缺的國族 自決的城邦 二十世紀中國民族國家建構困境下的香港問題) by Hung Ho-fung, Hong Kong-born American sociologist
- Revisiting City-state: Brief History of Hong Kong Localism (Note: 城邦述事：香港本土意識簡史) by Eric Sing-yan Tsui (徐承恩), Hong Kong doctor and commentator
- Dispelling Doubts of Localism (Note: 本土思潮的幾點釋疑) by So Keng-chit (蘇賡哲)

== Government's criticisms ==
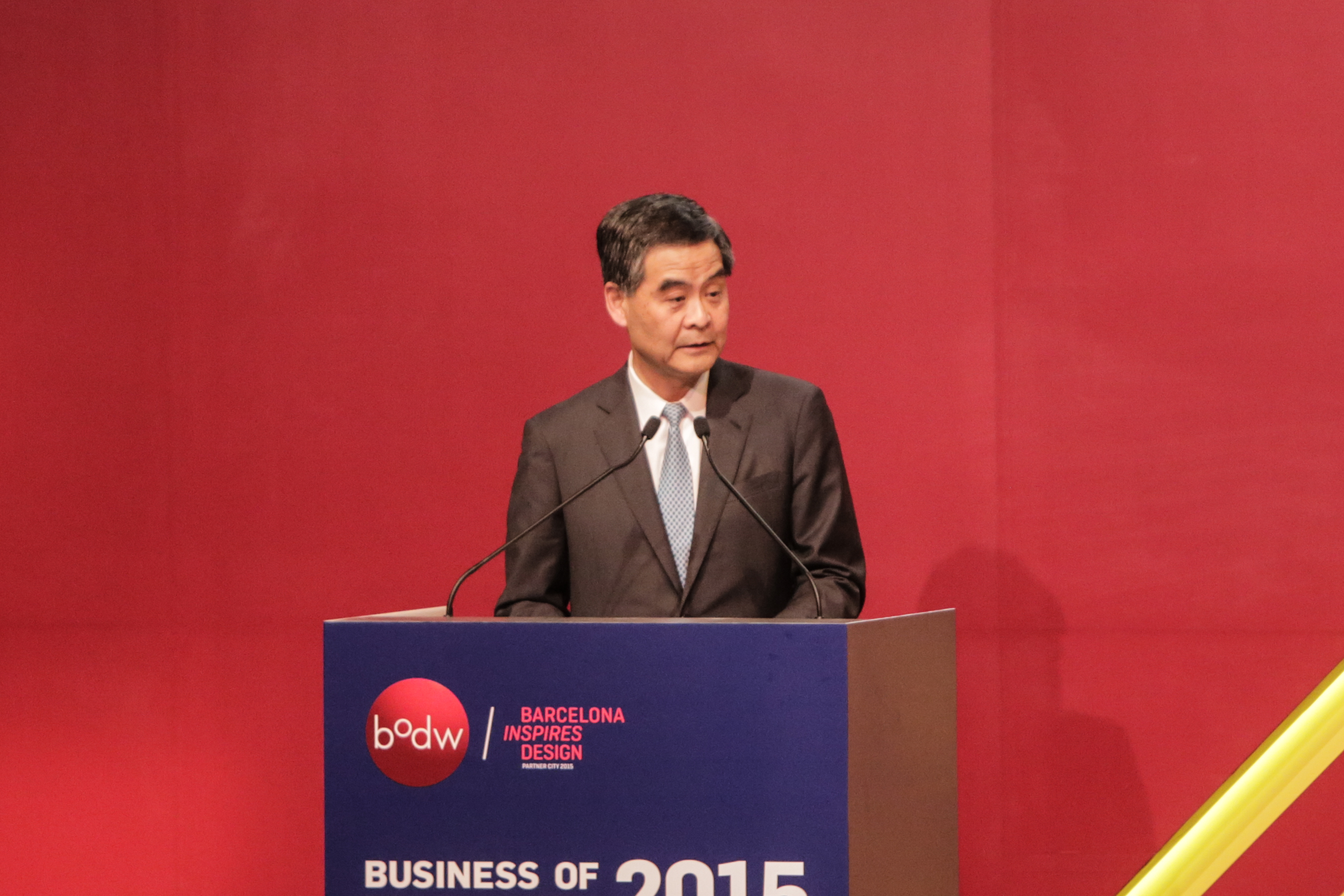
Leung Chun-ying in 2015

600 copies of Hong Kong Nationalism were sold in the first week, and around 1,300 more were sold between the first three months. But the discussion was mostly limited to the academic circle, and the book was relatively obscure and unknown to the general public, until Chief Executive Leung Chun-ying denounced the "fallacies" spread by it in the policy address delivered in January 2015.

The 2014 February issue of "Undergrad", the official magazine of the Hong Kong University Students’ Union, featured a cover story entitled "Hong Kong people deciding their own fate". In 2013, a book named "Hong Kong Nationalism" was published by "Undergrad". (Note: Although the book was edited by the 2013 session of the Undergrad, it was published in September 2014.) It advocates that Hong Kong should find a way to self-reliance and self-determination. "Undergrad" and other students, including student leaders of the occupy movement, have misstated some facts. We must stay alert. We also ask political figures with close ties to the leaders of the student movement to advise them against putting forward such fallacies... As we pursue democracy, we should act in accordance with the law, or Hong Kong will degenerate into anarchy.

— Leung Chun-ying, 2015 Policy Address, paragraph 10, 11

The attack was anticipated as the pro-government papers had already singled out Undergrad on the morning of the policy address. Nonetheless, the condemnation was unexpectedly placed at the early start, which Leung speculated it as a communist-style ideological confrontation intended to frighten the student activists. Other non-political issues such as housing and social care delivered in the Policy Address were overshadowed by the "concerns" of independence.

Leung's remarks prompted sudden interest in separatism, and the book to fly off the shelves across the city on the same day. New 3,000 copies were then shipped and sold.

The student editors of Undergrad slammed Leung for his unprecedented attack on a student publication "devouring freedom of speech", and clarified that the book does not intend to promote independence nor there is a hidden agenda of so. Instead, the students explained, the book aimed to contribute to the academic discourse on Hong Kong's identity and implications of that notion. However, Brian Leung said the idea of independence will grow and might become a "substantive option" for Hongkongers in the future.

== Aftermath ==
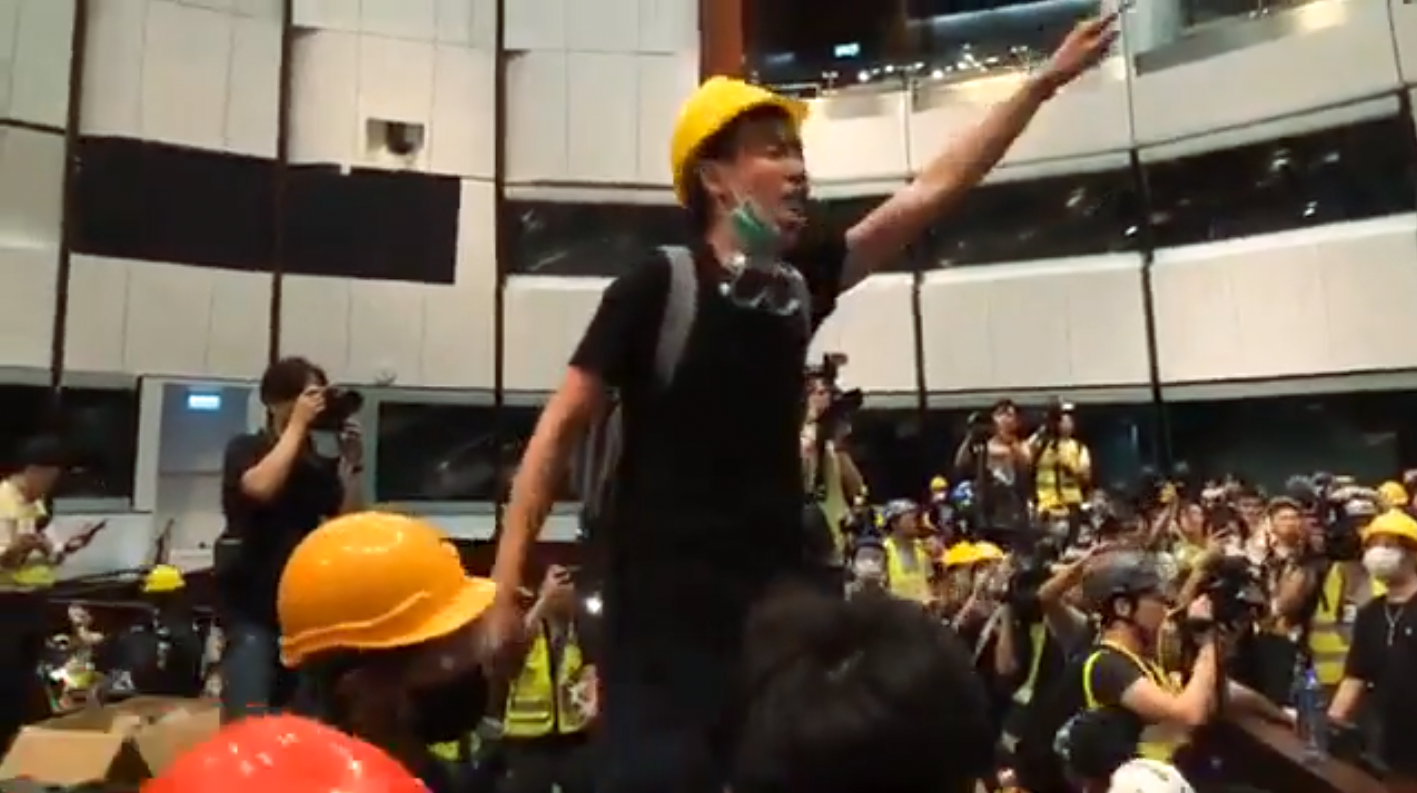
Brian Leung stormed the Legislative Council on 1 July 2019

As Hong Kong Nationalism and the topic of Hong Kong independence was given undue publicity, Leung was mocked by the localist camp as "the father of Hong Kong independence", who created "a crisis that wasn't even there". Leung insisted Hong Kong independence would be unconstitutional and inviable, and continued his zero-tolerance policy against "secessionists" throughout his term. Pro-Beijing bloc's reiteration on suppressing the secession ignited further debates, while traditional democrats were as also pulled into the argument.

Sino United Publishing, the publishing group controlled by the Chinese authorities, decided not to purchase the book after the Umbrella Movement citing "commercial decision", which Jack Li said was a censorship.

In the next few years, calls for separating Hong Kong from China remained in the city. It was subsequently amplified by the anti-extradition bill protests in 2019. Chinese government, in response, imposed the national security law that criminalises acts including subversion and secession. Hong Kong government then began reviewing books in the public library "to avoid breaching the national security law", and in May 2021, Hong Kong Nationalism was eventually removed from shelf.

Brian Leung fled to the United States after storming the Legislative Council in July 2019 and joined the Hong Kong Democracy Council, advocating Hong Kong's autonomy from abroad. Hong Kong police reportedly placed a bounty on him for secession and collusion. A year later, Jack Li defected to Hope for Hong Kong, a moderate party, rejecting separatism as impractical and unrealistic.

== See also ==
- Hong Kong independence
- Localist camp
- Hong Kong National Party
- Chin Wan, author of On the Hong Kong City-State
