= Honcques Laus =

Hong Kong independence activist (born 2001)

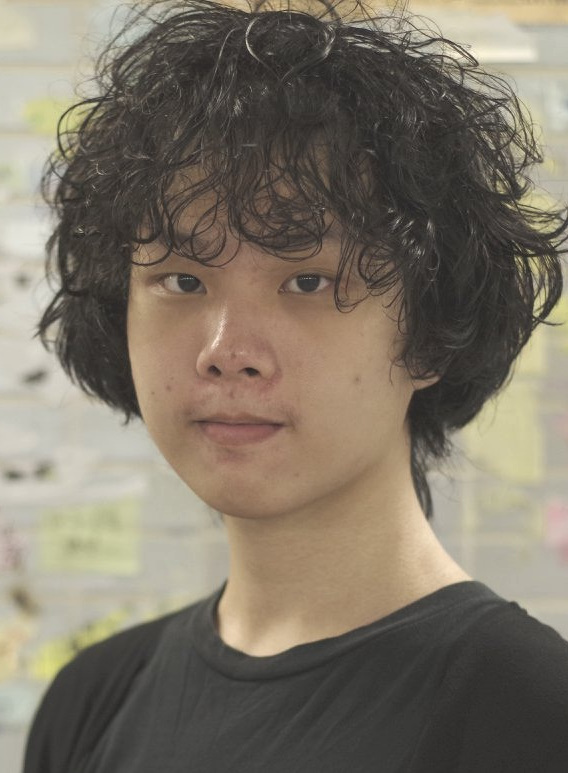
- Laus in 2019
- Born: Hong Lau; 10 October 2001 (age 24); Sai Ying Pun, Hong Kong
- Education: University of Oxford

Chinese name
- Traditional Chinese: 劉康
- Simplified Chinese: 刘康
Transcriptions
Standard Mandarin
- Hanyu Pinyin: Liú Kāng
Yue: Cantonese
- Jyutping: Lau^{4} Hong^{1}

Honcques Laus (Chinese: 劉康; born 10 October 2001) is a Hong Kong independence activist, author, and director of the Oxford University Student Union. During a group photo shoot with Chief Executive Carrie Lam at a Ming Pao student event in 2017, Laus displayed the slogan "Hong Kong independence" on his phone. He fled to the United Kingdom shortly before the imposition of the Hong Kong national security law on 30 June 2020, and was wanted by the Hong Kong Police Force thereafter for political reasons.

== Biography ==
Honcques Laus was born Hong Lau (Western naming order) in Tsan Yuk Hospital in Sai Ying Pun on 10 October 2001. He studied at Kwai Chung Methodist College. In the aftermath of the 2014 Umbrella Revolution, Laus began to believe that Hong Kong did not truly have democracy and freedom, and began to involve himself in politics and social justice movements. In 2016, the localist camp gained traction during the New Territories East by-election, inspiring Laus to start advocating Hong Kong independence.

On 16 November 2017, during an awards ceremony held by Ming Pao, Laus had a chance to take a group photo with then chief executive Carrie Lam. Placed in the back row, he held up his phone which displayed the slogan "Hong Kong independence"; this was not immediately noticed by the photographers. After the incident, staff at Kwai Chung Methodist College warned him against repeating his actions, but Laus contended that he was exercising his political rights and decided to protest outside school grounds on 24 November. The pro-independence groups Hong Kong National Front and Studentlocalism also demonstrated that day in support of Laus, although Laus himself was not allowed to leave the school for two hours due to "safety reasons".

In December 2017, he was arrested for bringing a toy gun to the Lennon Wall near the Legislative Council Complex. He was later charged with possessing an imitation firearm. On 12 September 2018, he was sentenced to 18 months of probation. In June 2019, he appealed his charges and sentence, with Martin Lee representing him. On 4 July 2019, he won the appeal against his conviction.

On 29 June 2019, he founded the Hongkonger Utilitarian Party (香港效益主義黨), a pro-independence group which advocates utilitarianism, emphasizing liberty, democracy, and independence.

In August 2019, he published his first book, Making Light of Current Affairs (輕論時政) at the age of 17. Activists including Lam Wing-kee and Joshua Wong were invited to write the foreword.

In late June 2020, shortly before the Hong Kong national security law came into force, he fled to the United Kingdom and sought asylum. He stated that he would not give up his political views. On 31 July, he was wanted, together with five other activists, by the Hong Kong Police Force. Laus was accused of "incitement to secession and collusion with foreign forces". In December 2020, Laus posted on Facebook that his Bank of China account had been suspended, although the account only had HK$47.23.

In 2024, he received an offer and scholarship from the University of Oxford, where he is studying theology and philosophy.

In February 2026, Honcques Laus was elected as a trustee and director of the Oxford University Student Union. In this role, he oversees the SU operations, financial management, and key strategies.
