= Tony Chung =

Hong Kong pro-independence activist

- 鍾翰林
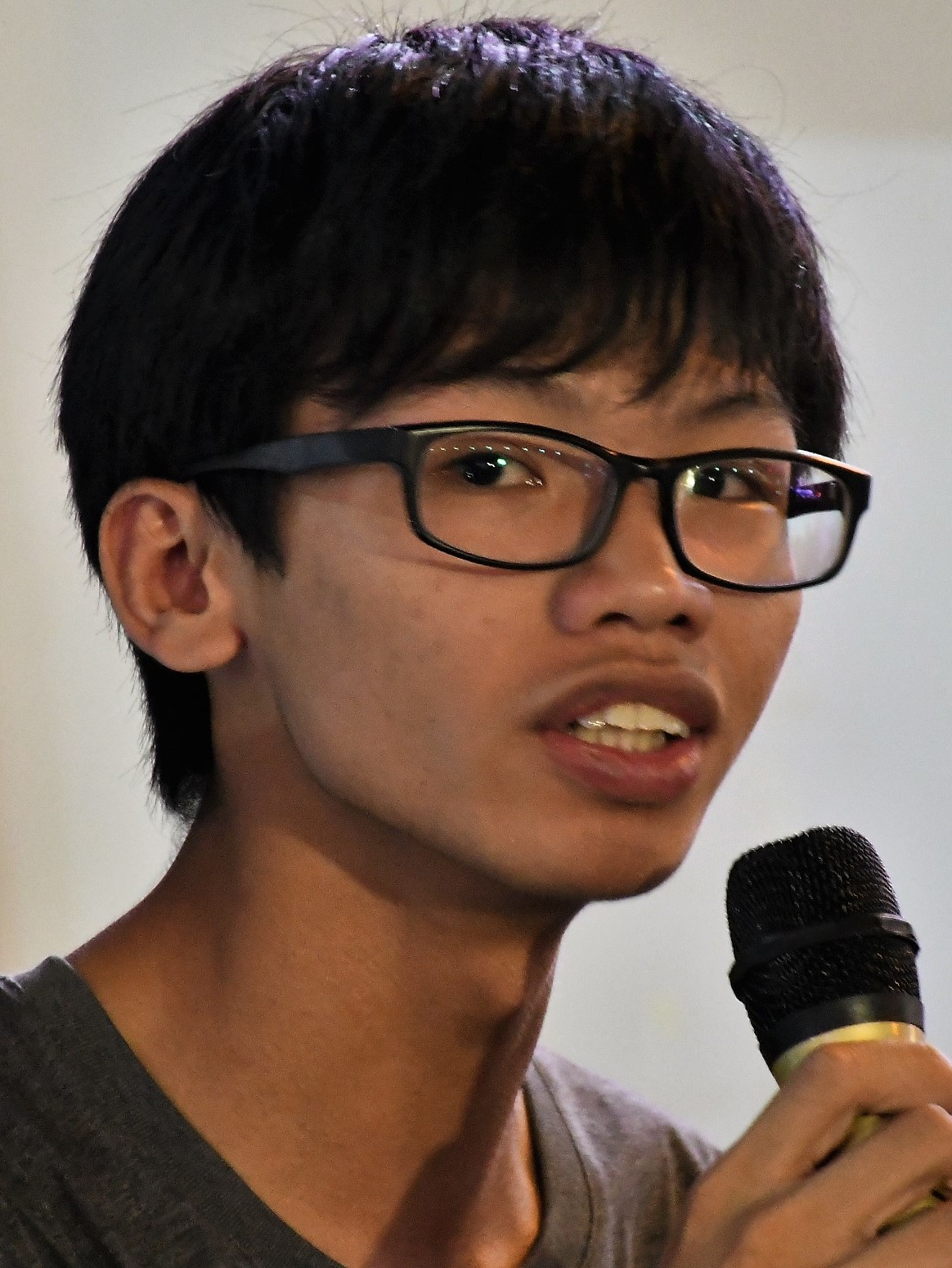

Personal details
- Born: 22 April 2001 (age 25) Hong Kong
- Education: Hong Kong Institute of Vocational Education
- Occupation: Student activist
- Known for: Hong Kong independence Former Convenor of Studentlocalism

Chinese name
- Traditional Chinese: 鍾翰林
- Simplified Chinese: 钟翰林
Transcriptions
Standard Mandarin
- Hanyu Pinyin: Zhōng Hàn lín
Yue: Cantonese
- Yale Romanization: Jūng Hohn làhm
- Jyutping: Zung^{1} Hon^{6}-lam^{4}

Tony Chung Hon-lam (Chinese: 鍾翰林; born 22 April 2001) is a Hong Kong pro-independence activist. He was the founder and convenor of the localist camp student group Studentlocalism. On 29 July 2020, he became the first political figure to be arrested on suspicion of violating the newly imposed national security law and has also been charged with money laundering and publishing seditious articles. In December 2023 he fled to the United Kingdom to seek asylum.

== Biography ==
=== Early life ===
Chung was born in Hong Kong in 2001 and was educated at Buddhist Mau Fung Memorial College and Hong Kong Institute of Vocational Education. His political awakening came from a minor demonstration outside the People's Liberation Army headquarters in Central in late 2013 when he was 12. His first direct involvement in politics was in 2016 when he and some like-minded joined the campaign for localist camp candidate Edward Leung in the 2018 New Territories East by-election for the Legislative Council.

=== Founding Studentlocalism ===
Soon after the election in April 2016, Chung co-founded Studentlocalism with three other secondary school students which aimed to create a Hong Kong republic that would enjoy independent sovereignty. It aimed to promote the concept of independence on campus by setting up student concern groups. By the end of August 2016, 28 localist concern groups were being formed at schools across the city.

In an interview with Hong Kong Free Press in 2017, Chung explained why he supported Hong Kong independence: "I was born here, I grew up here. We often see the situation in China – it’s exactly why we do not want the place we live in to become the same as China." He also predicted: “In the next five years the national security law may be enacted, or I may be charged with some offence… I can’t say it is a must for me to stay.”

The group drew attention from the then Chief Executive Leung Chun-ying. Leung claimed that discussion of separatism in schools was "absolutely not a matter of freedom of speech," and students could be kicked out of school for discussing it. Chung believed that Leung put the student groups on the map. He and other Studentlocalism leaders had been "investigated" by state-owned newspaper Wen Wei Po. He was also reportedly shadowed by three retired local police officers during a trip to Taiwan in 2019.

=== 2019 anti-extradition protests, national security law, and self-exile ===
The group went to decline after Edward Leung and Chan Ho-tin of the Hong Kong National Party (HKNP) were barred from running in the 2016 Legislative Council election, as three co-founders of Studentlocalism withdrew from the group. But the group became active again during the 2019–2020 anti-extradition protests where the group attempted to organised some protests. Chung was also personally charged of damaging the Chinese national flag at the Legislative Council's protest zone in May 2019.

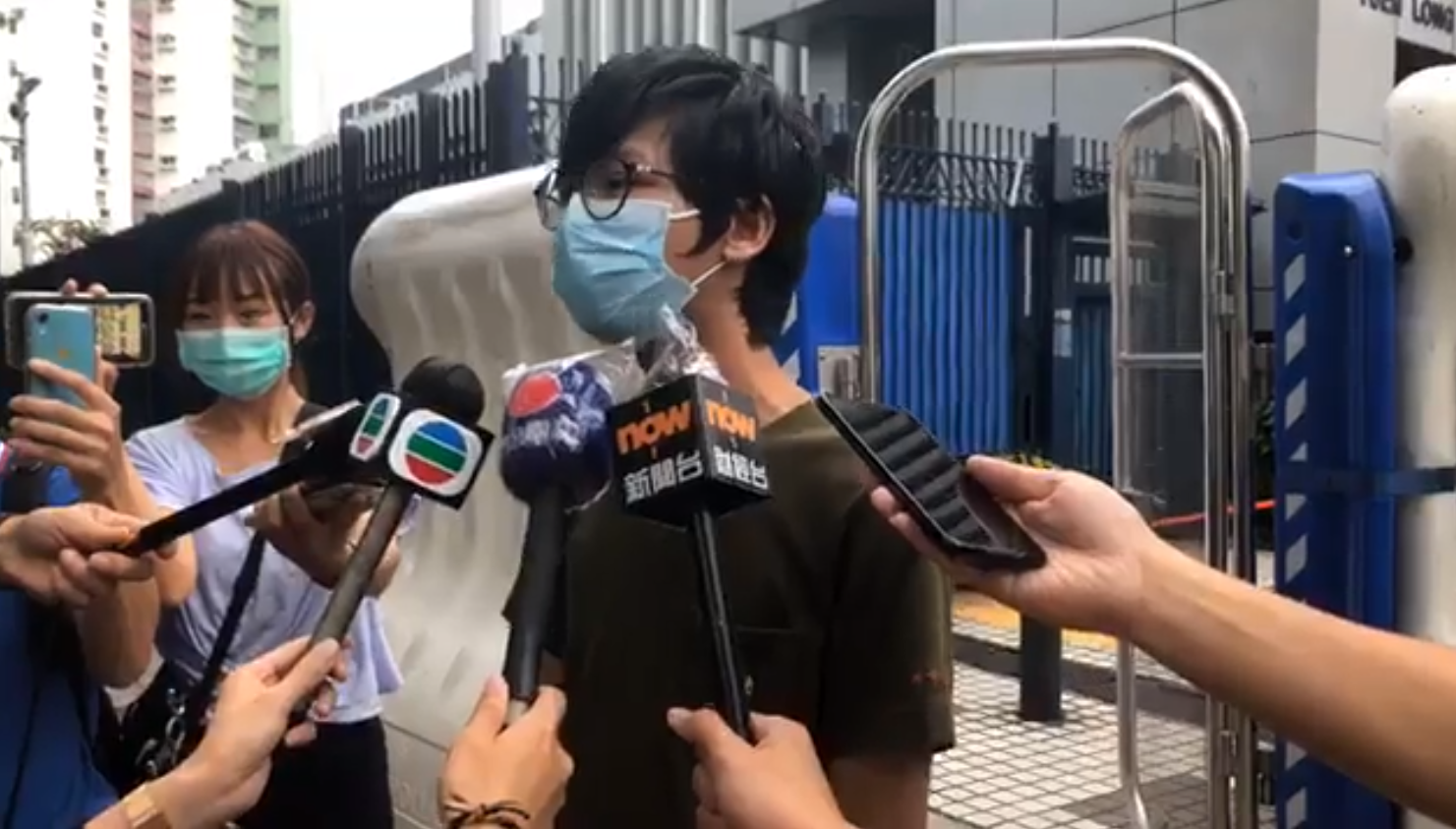
Chung released outside Yuen Long Police Station on 31 July 2020

On the eve of the passing of the national security law on 30 June, Chung dissolved Studentlocalism and handed over the authority to the overseas branches. The overseas branches announced that they would operate from abroad with divisions in Australia, Taiwan and the United States "until Hong Kong becomes an independent sovereign country." On 29 July, Chung and three other former members of Studentlocalism aged 16 to 21 were arrested on suspicion of inciting secession. It was speculated that the police arrested Chung for the social media content posted by the Initiative Independence Party who claimed to be founded by former Studentlocalism members who were based overseas. Chung was released on bail on 31 July without being charged.

On 27 October 2020, Chung was arrested by the Hong Kong police national security unit outside the U.S. Consulate General in Hong Kong, allegedly when Chung was attempting to seek asylum at the consulate. In the afternoon on the same day, two other former members of Studentlocalism William Chan and Yanni Ho were also taken into custody by the police. He was subsequently charged with undermining national unification and conspiring to publish seditious materials on the next day. Being denied bail, Chung would be detained until his court hearing in January 2021.

On 11 December 2020, Chung was convicted of desecrating the Chinese flag and also of participating in an unlawful assembly in relation to the 14 May 2019 protest at LegCo. On 29 December 2020 he was sentenced to three months for each of the two charges, and ordered to spend a total of four months behind bars. In addition, Chung continued to face pending charges of secession, money laundering, and conspiracy to publish seditious content.

On 3 November 2021, Chung pleaded guilty to secession under the national security law and money-laundering. The prosecutor read out the summary of facts for the charges, including social media posts dating back to 2016 which called for the public to join protests and push to "get rid of Chinese colonial rule," as well as the mission and manifesto of the Studentlocalism. Names and amount of donations made to Chung's PayPal accounts with messages such as "keep it up" and "Hong Kong independence" were also read aloud at the court. After the clerk read out the secession charge, Chung said "I plead guilty, I have no shame in my heart." He was interrupted the clerk who told Chung not to "make any political declaration." He was sentenced to three years and seven months on 23 November, becoming the third and the youngest person to be jailed under the national security law, after he had pleaded guilty to secession and one count of money laundering.

On 28 December 2023, it was announced that Chung had sought asylum in the United Kingdom. Chung was granted permission to take a short trip to Japan on holiday on condition that he had a return ticket, but fled to London instead. On 24 December 2024, a list of six people living overseas who were wanted by Hong Kong police over national security offences was published; Chung was on the list. In March 2025, it was reported that neighbours of Chung in the UK, along with those of fellow activist Carmen Lau, had received letters that had encouraged them to hand him over to the Chinese embassy. An embassy spokesperson denied the allegation, saying that the letters were made up and staged. Hong Kong police confirmed in March 2025 that they had brought in a person that month, who local media reported to be Chung's stepfather, to assist with their investigation.
