= Carmel Divine Grace Foundation Secondary School =

Aided secondary school in Hong Kong

Coordinates: 22.3265°N 114.2545°E

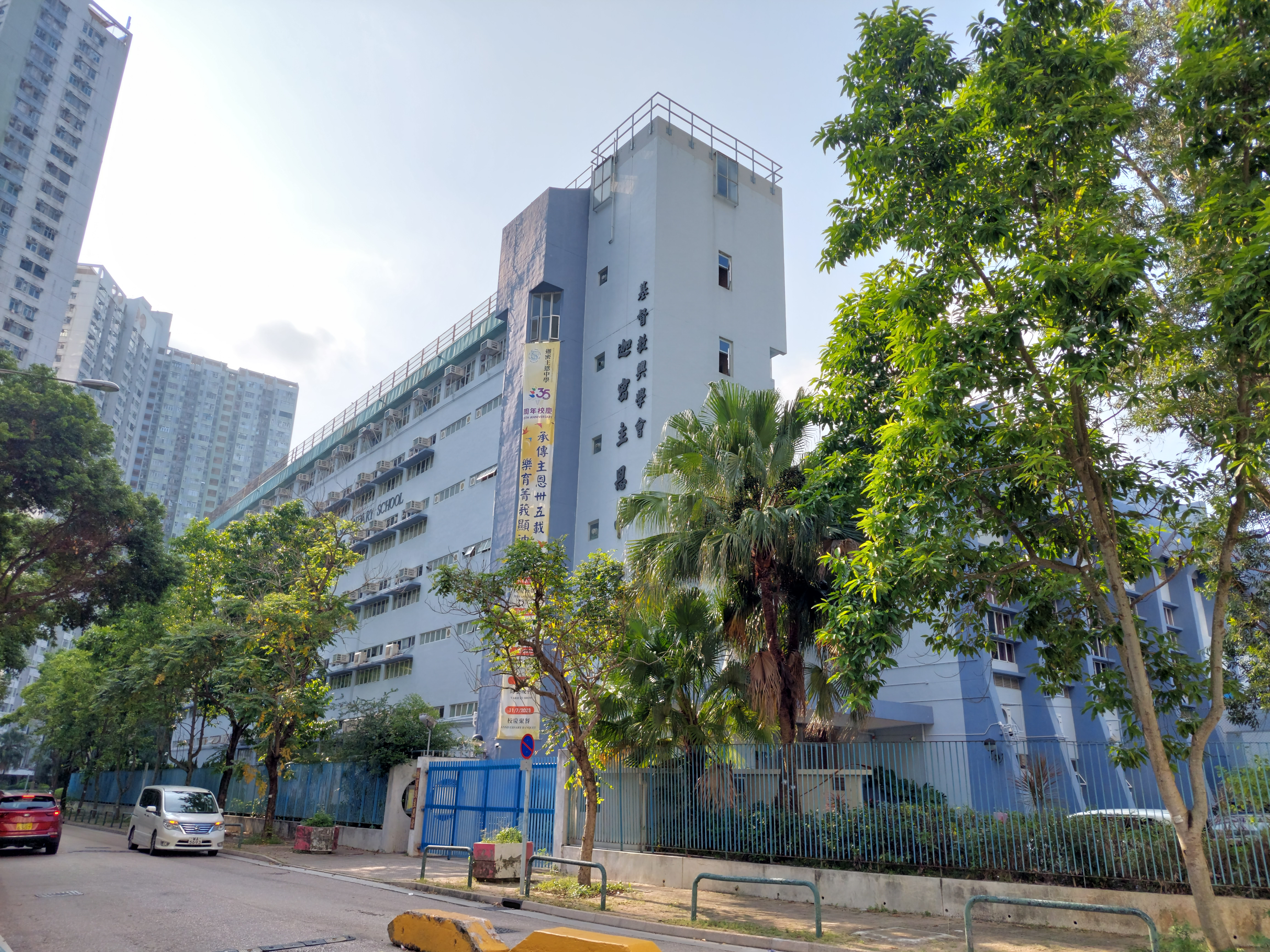

Information
- Type: Aided secondary school
- Motto: 明道律己，忠主善群
- Religious affiliation: Christianity
- Established: 1987
- President: 徐家賢
- Affiliation: Evangelical School Development Incorporation
- Website: cdgfss.edu.hk

Carmel Divine Grace Foundation Secondary School is located in Po Lam, Tseung Kwan O, Sai Kung District, New Territories, Hong Kong, China. It is the first secondary school in the new town of Tseung Kwan O, and the oldest school teaching in English in Sai Kung District.

== History ==
The school was opened in 1987 by Christian Association Limited. The cost of furnishing and equipping the new school premises was donated by the “Divine Grace Foundation” set up by Presbyter M H Lau.

=== Medium of instruction ===
The school is the oldest school teaching in English in Sai Kung District. The school was approved by the Education Department in 1998 to continue to use English as the medium of instruction. The School became one of the 114 EMI secondary schools in the territory and was the only EMI school in the Sai Kung District.

The school is ranked as a Band 1 English secondary school. The students take the Diploma of Secondary Education Examination to graduate.

== Houses ==
Carmel Lord's Grace Middle School is divided into four houses: Matthew (Green), Mark (Blue), Luke (Red), John (Yellow), named after the four authors of the four Gospels in the New Testament of the Christian Bible.

== Extracurricular activities ==
In 2023, the school fielded a team in the Zurich Insurance Hong Kong Schools 3x3 Basketball Challenge.
