= Joey Siu =

Hong Kong activist

Joey Siu Lam
- 邵嵐
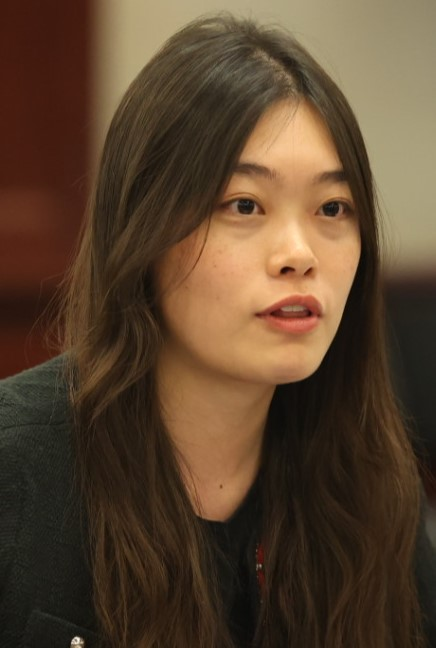
- Joey Siu in 2024
- Born: 16 April 1999 (age 27); North Carolina, United States
- Citizenship: United States
- Education: City University of Hong Kong
- Occupation: Human rights activist
- Employer: National Democratic Institute

Chinese name
- Traditional Chinese: 邵嵐
- Simplified Chinese: 邵岚
Transcriptions
Standard Mandarin
- Hanyu Pinyin: Shào Lán
Yue: Cantonese
- Jyutping: Siu^{6} Laam^{4}

Joey Siu Lam (Chinese: 邵嵐; born 16 April 1999) is an American human rights activist. During her time in Hong Kong as a student in the City University of Hong Kong, she served as spokesperson of the Hong Kong Higher Institutions International Affairs Delegation (HKIAD) and lobbied internationally on human rights issues during the 2019–2020 Hong Kong protests.

== Early life and education ==
Siu was born in North Carolina in 1999. At the age of seven, she moved to Hong Kong and attended St. Mark's School. She then studied at the Department of Public Policy and Political Science at the City University of Hong Kong. While in college, she served as an officer of the 34th Association of Public Administration Disciplines and became the external vice president of the Interim Committee of the City University of Hong Kong Student Union on 3 June 2019.

== Activism ==
During the 2019–2020 Hong Kong protests against the Government of Hong Kong's introduction of the 2019 Hong Kong extradition bill, Siu served as the spokesperson of the Hong Kong Higher Institutions International Affairs Delegation (HKIAD), which was a joint effort of members of student unions of 12 higher education institutions in Hong Kong protesting against the extradition bill in an international level. As spokesperson, she travelled to the United Kingdom, United States, Germany and Switzerland to give speeches and lobby against the extradition bill.

In October 2019, she and another member of the HKIAD traveled to Frankfurt, Germany to meet with members of the European Parliament to discuss follow-up measures for Hong Kong's human rights issues. On 6 November 2019, Siu accepted an exclusive interview with Deutsche Welle's Conflict Zone titled "Hong Kong: Will violence kill the pro-democracy movement?" Siu told Tim Sebastian in the interview that she agreed that demonstrators should try to use peaceful means to express their demands and believed that violence was not a solution to force the government to respond to their demands, but she did not think that the demonstrators' behavior was out of control. When Sebastian asked her regarding the beating of a 49-year-old pro-Chinese demonstrator by protestors and if this was "the way you treat people with different opinions?", she responded by not looking back at Sebastian and said, "well, of course this is not an ideal way." When Sebastian responded to her, "ideal? You don't even condemn it?" Siu said "We don't condemn anything." After the interview was released, it resulted in heated discussions regarding Siu's statements.

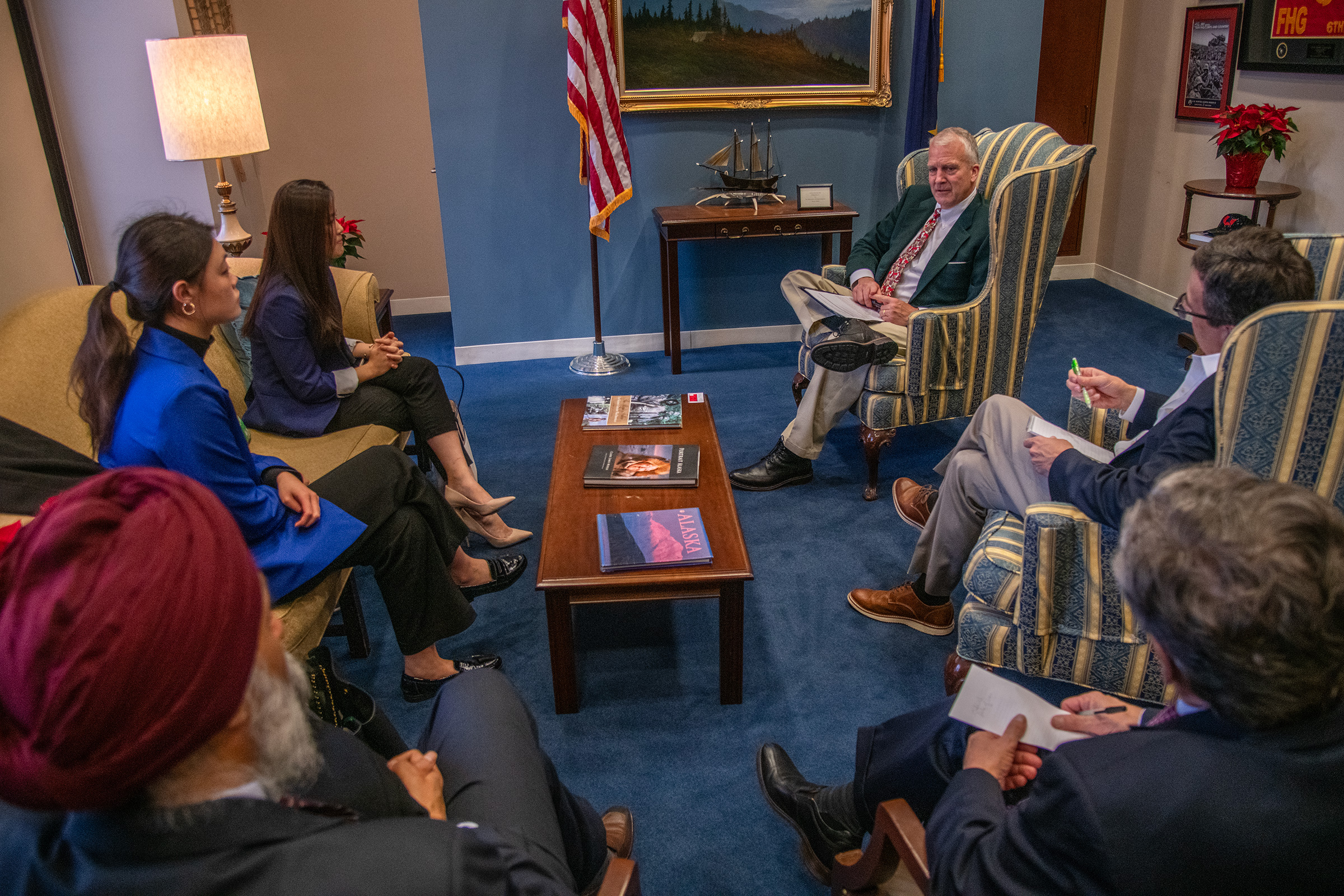
Siu and Frances Hui meeting with U.S. senator Dan Sullivan (2023)

In early June 2020, she became an advisor to the Inter-Parliamentary Alliance on China and policy advisor to Hong Kong Watch. Later that month, she announced her withdrawal from the HKIAD following the passing of the Hong Kong National Security Law in order to avoid tainting her relatives and friends due to her political stance. She stated that she would still actively campaign for human rights in Hong Kong at the international level. In September 2020, following the increase on crackdown of pro-democracy activists in Hong Kong, she fled to the United States, settling in Washington, D.C. After settling in the United States, Siu continued to advocate and call attention for human rights issues in Hong Kong, such as Hong Kong 12 and Hong Kong 47. On 16 December 2020, she testified at the United States Senate Committee on the Judiciary's hearing on Hong Kong.

On 17 October 2021, Siu, a Tibetan-American student and a Vietnamese-American activist protested against the hosting of 2022 Winter Olympics in Beijing, China by unfurling the Tibetan flag and a banner with the 2019–2020 Hong Kong protests' slogan 'Liberate Hong Kong, revolution of our times' at the Acropolis during the Olympic Flame ceremony. They were detained by the Greek Police. Siu was released after being detained for 26 hours while the others were released after 48 hours. Accused of "attempting to pollute, damage, and distort a historical monument", a Greek court acquitted them of all charges on 17 November 2022.

On 6 April 2022, she spoke at the Summit for Human Rights and Democracy in Geneva, Switzerland, and on 18 October 2022, at the Oslo Freedom Forum in Taiwan, she stated that her "situation is to let everyone know how dangerous the national security law is." In December 2023, Hong Kong police offered HKD 1 million (US$128,000) bounties for information leading to the capture of five prominent democracy activists based abroad including Siu and wanted for national security crimes. As she holds US citizenship, this made her the first US citizen to be declared a fugitive under the Hong Kong National Security Law. In response to the warrant, she stated: "My response to the Chinese Communist regime's intimidation is short: I will never be silenced, I will never back down." She regularly consults with the FBI due to threats and harassment, and fear of transnational repression after the warrant was placed on her. On 24 December 2024, the Hong Kong government canceled the Hong Kong passports of Siu and six other Hong Kong activists based overseas under Hong Kong Basic Law Article 23. Since then, Siu has lost her Hong Kong citizenship.

As of 2024, she serves as a program associate at the National Democratic Institute and an ombudsman of the World Liberty Congress, a global movement of pro-democracy leaders.

== Publications ==
=== Articles ===
- 5 Steps Joe Biden Should Take to Confront the China Challenge, The Diplomat, 5 December 2020

=== Testimonies ===
- The Assault on Freedom of Expression in Asia - Testimony before the Senate Committee on Foreign Relations Subcommittee on East Asia, the Pacific, and International Cybersecurity, Joey Siu, 20 March 2022
- “Supporting Hong Kong’s Pro-Democracy Movement Through U.S. Refugee Policy,” Joey Siu, 16 December 2020
