= Our Lady's College, Hong Kong =

Aided secondary school in Hong Kong

Our Lady's College Chinese: 聖母書院
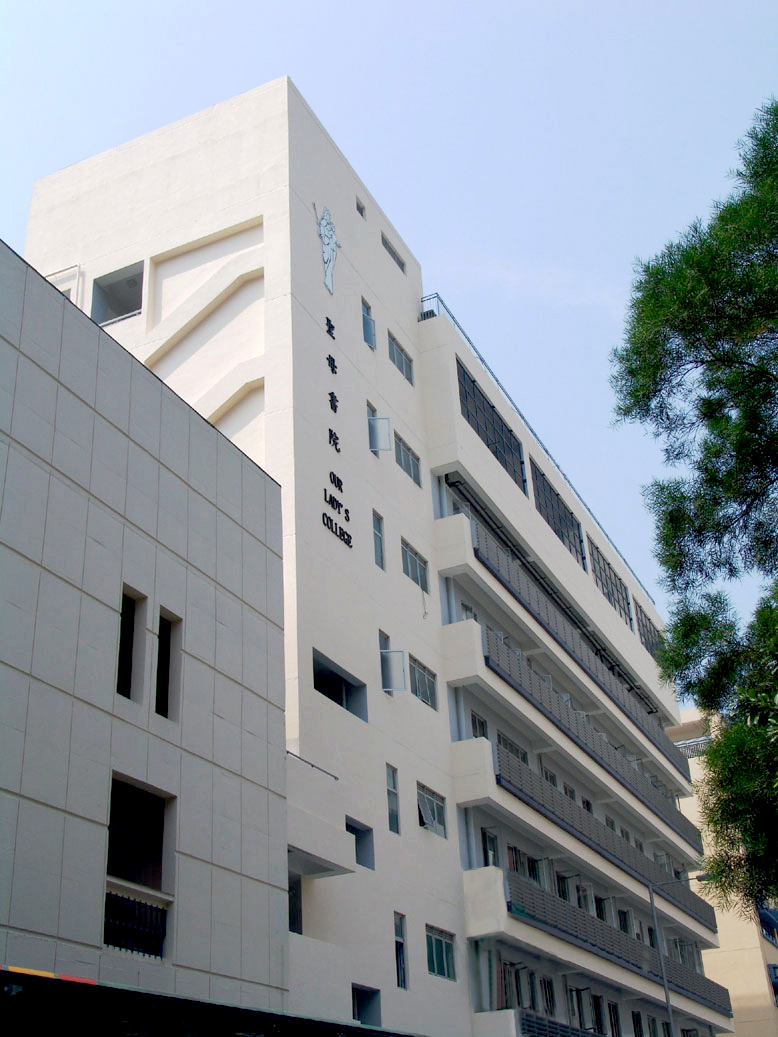
- New extension of Our Lady’s College

Location
- 3 Lung Fung Street; Wong Tai Sin, Kowloon; Hong Kong
- 22°20′41.87″N 114°11′47.47″E

Information
- Type: Aided
- Motto: Purity and Charity
- Religious affiliation: Catholicism
- Established: c. 1953; 73 years ago
- School district: Wong Tai Sin District
- Supervisor: Sr Tso Enid
- Principal: Sr Amy Lim Lai-ling
- Grades: Form 1–Form 6
- Gender: Girls
- Enrollment: approx. 1,100
- Language: English
- Publication: Our Ladian
- Affiliation: The Daughters of Mary Help of Christians
- Website: olc.edu.hk

Our Lady's College, Hong Kong
- Traditional Chinese: 聖母書院
- Simplified Chinese: 圣母书院
- Literal meaning: Saint Mother (Virgin Mary) College
Transcriptions
Standard Mandarin
- Hanyu Pinyin: Shèngmǔ Shūyuàn
Yue: Cantonese
- Jyutping: sing3 mou5 syu1 jyun6*2

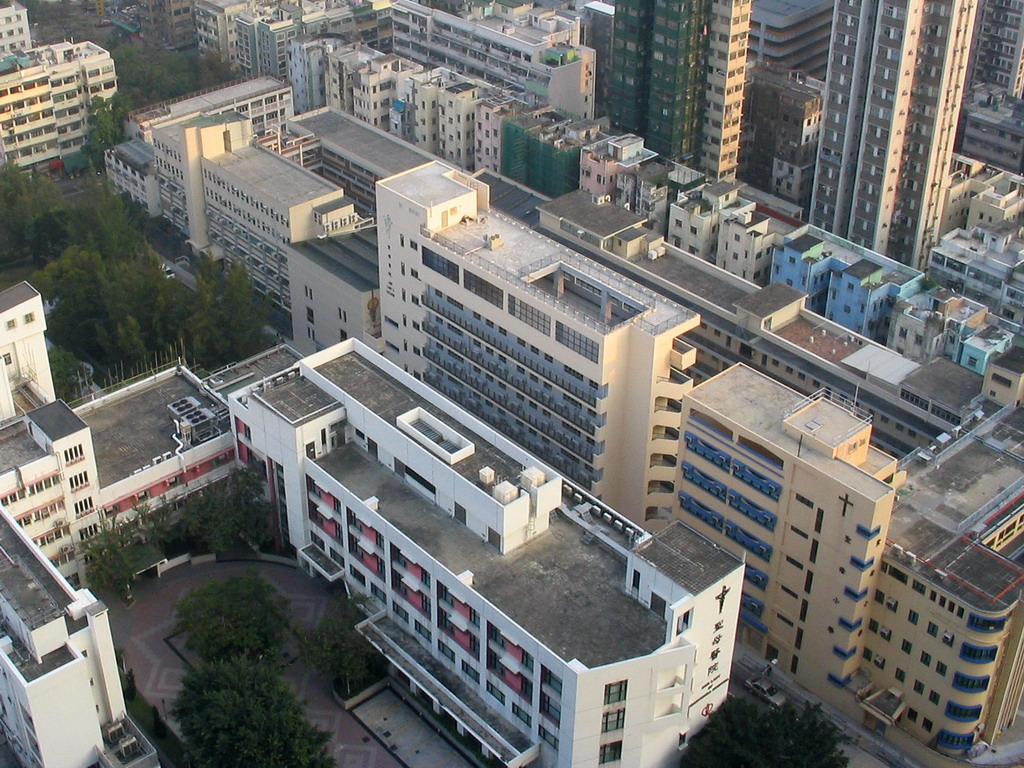
Aerial view

Our Lady's College (Chinese: 聖母書院) is an aided girls' secondary school in Wong Tai Sin, Kowloon, Hong Kong. It was founded in 1953 and is sponsored by the Daughters of Mary Help of Christians. It uses English as the medium of instruction.

== History ==
Year	School Events
1953	Laying of the foundation stone of Our Lady's School in Chuk Yuen.
1954	Our Lady's School opens with two classes of kindergarten, one class of Primary One and one class of Primary Two.
1960	The English Secondary Section begins. The Primary Section is divided into the English and the Chinese sections. The construction of a new building of Our Lady's School begins.
1962	The school is renamed as Our Lady's College. Opening of the Chinese Secondary Section.
1965	The first class of Form Five pupils joins the Hong Kong School Certificate Examination.
1969	The school becomes private assisted.
1979	The Secondary Section becomes fully aided. 11 and 12 May - Open Day to celebrate the Silver Jubilee of Our Lady's College.
1984	The school begins operating F.6 classes.
1986	The formation of the Students' Association.
1996	The Parent-Teacher Association is officially established.
1998	The government approves that the school's continued use of English as the medium of instruction.
2003	Handover of the site for construction of the new extension. The school celebrates its golden jubilee.
2006	An external school review is conducted on the school by the EMB.
2007	Completion of the annex.
2008	55th Anniversary. Completion of the conversion: CAL room, Language room and CAL preparation room.
2013	60th Anniversary. Diamond jubilee reunion dinner was on 18 May.

== Facilities ==
The school occupies an area of 66,000 sq ft (6,100 m^{2}) and has 30 classrooms, 17 special rooms, a chapel, an assembly hall that can accommodate all staff and students, two playgrounds, and a spacious basement.

== Class structure ==
Secondary	No. of class
S.1	4
S.2	4
S.3	5
	Arts Stream	Science Stream
S.4	3	2
S.5	4	2
S.6	3	2

== School Uniform and accessories ==
- Hair accessories: Black, white and dark blue colours only.
- Form 1–Form 6: the school badge is blue in colour

== Students' Association ==
The aims of the Students' Association are to enhance communication between the school and the students, promote the interface of the students and strengthen the sense of unity among students. Moreover, students are encouraged to participate actively in extra-curricular activities and community service. Committee members include S.2-S.5 students .

== School Press ==
School Press is in its 22nd year. Each year, it publishes three issues of Our Ladian. By the effort of its members, it provides schoolmates with interesting news about the school and the world.

== Houses ==
- Faith House
- Hope House
- Love House
- Wisdom House

== See also ==
- Education in Hong Kong
- List of secondary schools in Hong Kong
