= Chung Kim-wah =

Hong Kong scholar in exile (born 1960)

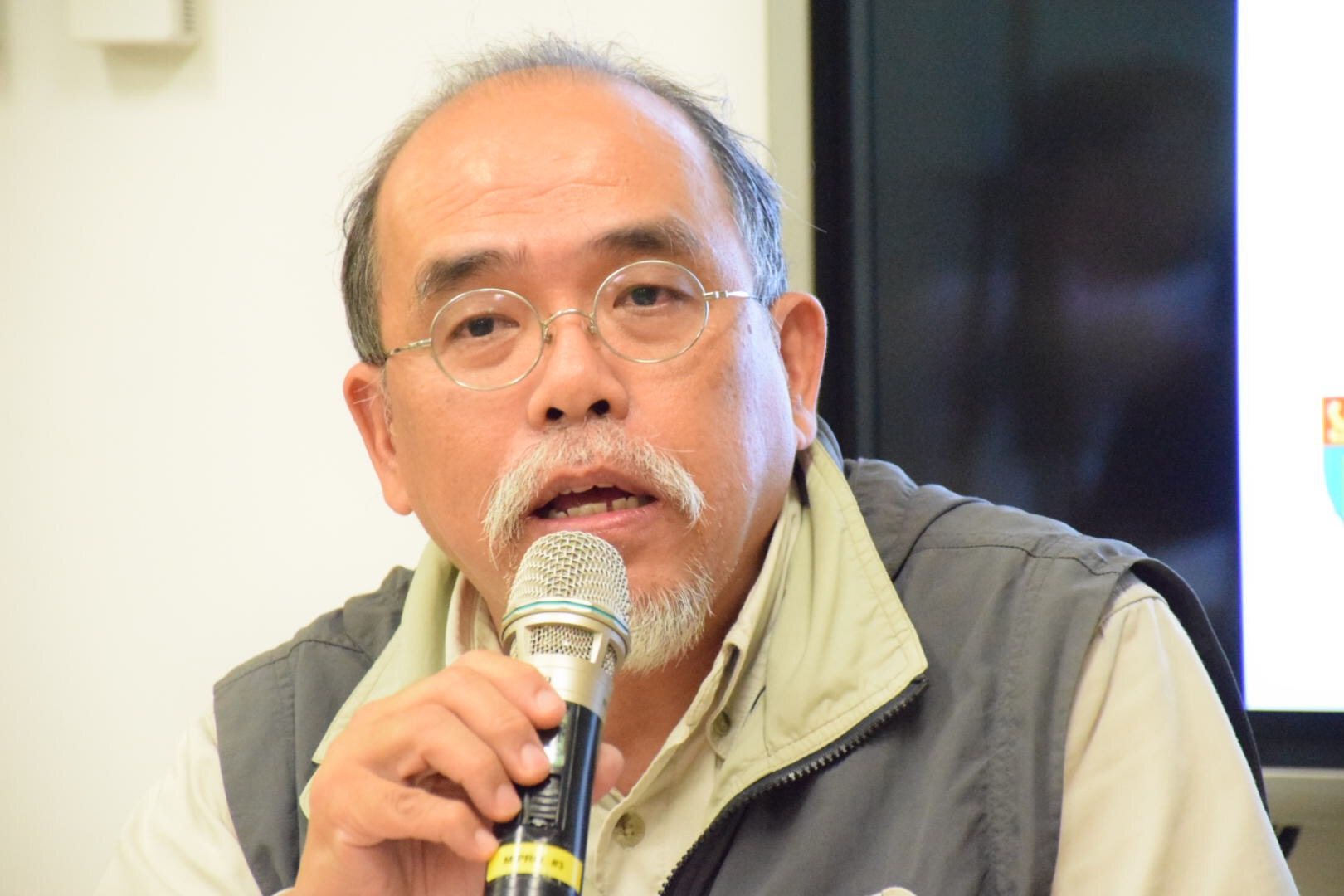
- Chun as a professor of applied social sciences in Hong Kong Polytechnic University, 2017
- Born: January 9, 1960 (age 66); Hong Kong
- Education: Moral Training English College (Highschool); Chinese University of Hong Kong, Bachelor in Social Science; University of Hong Kong, M.A. and PhD in Social Science
- Occupations: Scholar, Professor, Social Worker, Political and Poll Commentator
- Known for: Anti-legalization of gambling; Activism for universal pension and standardized working hours
- Criminal charges: "Incitement of Sedition, Cooperation with Foreign Powers with the Intention to Subvert National Security"
- Criminal status: Wanted with a one-million HKD bounty from the National Security Department (~125,000 USD), since 24 December 2024

Chung Kim-wah (Traditional Chinese: 鍾劍華, born January 9, 1960) is an exiled Hong Kong-born scholar. He is noted as a political commentator in Hong Kong, and frequently references the dystopian fiction Nineteen Eighty-Four.

== Early life ==
Chung was born in a sailor family at Choi Hung Estate, Kowloon. He received his Bachelor's degree in Chinese University of Hong Kong and PhD from University of Hong Kong, both in Social Science. He works as a social worker and teacher. As a scholar, he conducts surveys and writes analytic pieces.

Chung was disappointed with the government after the handover of Hong Kong in 1997.

== Research career ==
Chung's early articles focused on social policies. These include opposition to legalizing gambling in Hong Kong, suggesting universal pension and standardized working hours. Hoping to reach a wider audience than published survey reviews, he began writing opinion pieces on political issues, both online and on newspapers.

After retiring in 2020, he joined the Hong Kong Public Opinion Research Institute and served as the chief executive. His researches on popular opinions suggest a decline in self-identification as "Hongkongers", rising feeling of hopelessness, and dissatisfaction with the government under Pro-Beijing camp.

== Exile ==
Chung was investigated by the National Security Department for his public survey on the 2022 Russian invasion of Ukraine. He left for United Kingdom that April, following several arrests on political dissidents, citing concerns of his safety.

In December 2024, the National Security Department issued a warrant for Chung for "inciting secession of the state" and "colluding with foreign countries or external forces to endanger the national security". The government accused him for advocating Hong Kong independence; and of treason, for pleading foreign sanctions against People's Republic of China and the government of Hong Kong. Chung maintains his innocence.

On 14 January 2025, Chung’s wife and son in Hong Kong were detained from home to two police stations for investigation by the national security agents. Eight days later (22 January), Chung's brother and two sisters were also detained from their homes to 3 different police stations for investigation by the agents.
