= Studentlocalism =

Hong Kong pro-independence organization

Studentlocalism 學生動源
- Convener: Tony Chung (former)
- Founded: April 2016
- Dissolved: 30 June 2020 (Hong Kong headquarters)
- Ideology: Hong Kong nationalism Hong Kong independence
- Colors: Deep sky blue

Studentlocalism is a pro-independence student organization in Hong Kong that was founded in April 2016. Its Hong Kong headquarters terminated its operations on 30 June 2020 hours before the Hong Kong national security law was passed in Beijing and came in force on the same day, while its overseas branches in Taiwan, Australia, and the United States continued their operations, advocating for Hong Kong independence.

== Arrests ==
On 29 July 2020, founder and convenor Tony Chung became the first political figure to be arrested on suspicion of violating the national security law. Chung was arrested again on 29 October 2020, with additional charges of money laundering and publishing seditious articles. He was denied bail. On 9 November, former member Tim Luk was arrested by the newly established national security unit of the Hong Kong police force, for "assisting fugitives".
