= Chloe Cheung =

Hong Kong pro-democracy activist

- 張晞晴

Personal details
- Born: Cheung Hei Ching; 5 February 2005 (age 21) Hong Kong
- Education: True Light Middle School; The Grammar School at Leeds; Horsforth School
- Occupation: Student, Activist

Chloe Cheung (Chinese: 張晞晴, born 5 February 2005) is a Hong Kong social activist. Exiled from Hong Kong, she lives in London, UK, where she works as a junior manager for the Committee for Freedom in Hong Kong. Her activism and advocacy for democracy in Hong Kong have gained the attention of Chinese officials and the Hong Kong Police. In December 2024, the Hong Kong Police issued a HK$1,000,000 reward for any information leading to her arrest. Accused of ‘secession’ and ‘collusion with foreign forces’, Cheung is the youngest person on the list of Wanted Persons of National Security Cases. Despite living abroad and her inability to return to Hong Kong, Cheung continues to fight for the freedom of Hong Kong.

== Personal life ==
Cheung spent the majority of her life in Hong Kong. She attended True Light Middle School, a prestigious all-girls school on Hong Kong Island. While in Hong Kong, she had her first taste of activism during the 2019-2020 pro-democracy protests, which were in response to the proposal of the 2019 Hong Kong Extradition Bill.

In 2021, Cheung’s family immigrated from Hong Kong to Leeds, UK. This move was facilitated by the British National Overseas visa, which is a special visa scheme that grants Hong Kongers permission to stay and obtain settlement in the UK. Once settled in Leeds, Cheung attended The Grammar School at Leeds and Horsforth School for her GCSEs. She completed her A-levels in maths, further maths, and economics at Allerton High School. Cheung is fluent in Cantonese, Mandarin, and English. Her language proficiencies have allowed her to present at various press conferences, panels, and a UN council meeting.

Now based in London, she currently works as a junior manager in public affairs and advocacy for the Committee for Freedom in Hong Kong Foundation. In addition to her professional work, Cheung maintains an active social media presence. She runs an active X (Twitter) and Instagram page, with an accumulated following of 9,000 people.

== Activism ==
Cheung’s first taste of activism was at the 2019 Hong Kong protests, which she attended with friends. At these protests, she saw the brutality of the Hong Kong police/regime firsthand. At one of these protests, she witnessed a Hong Kong police officer step on a protester’s neck, which heavily impacted her. After moving to Leeds in 2021, Cheung’s activism journey really began to flourish. She made a submission to the UN on the experiences of women during the 2019-2020 protests. Upon receiving this account, the UN invited her to their office in Geneva to join an NGO meeting on the topic.

Cheung founded several Hong Kong activist and support groups in Leeds. The same year that she arrived in Leeds, she founded Hong Kongers in Leeds, a group for Hong Kong people based in Leeds that advocates for freedom in Hong Kong. In 2022, Cheung co-founded Leeds Umbrella CIC. This is a community interest company that provides support to Hong Kongers living in the UK, through employment support, English classes, mental health support, and the promotion of Hong Kong culture.

Despite being abroad, Cheung continued to lobby for the Hong Kong cause in covert and overt ways. In 2023, Cheung was hired to work as a communications assistant for the Committee for Freedom in Hong Kong, where she continued to lobby for the Hong Kong cause. On 9 June 2024, Cheung participated in a rally outside the Hong Kong Economic and Trade Office in London. Together, protesters raised the colonial Hong Kong flag, then lowered it to half mast to mourn those who died or ‘disappeared’ during the months-long protests.

On 27 May 2025, Cheung spoke about transnational representation at the Oslo Freedom Forum. She was invited to speak on the panel, From Hub to Crisis: Hong Kong’s Shift cite, alongside Benedict Rogers, Carmen Lau, and Samuel Bickett. The panel explored the shift of Hong Kong after the passage of the National Security Law. Specialists talked about how the erosion of freedoms and autonomy forced the international companies, journalists, and NGOs to flee. Later that year, Cheung’s dedication and efforts were rewarded with her nomination for the Freedom of Expression Campaigning Award by the Index on Censorship.

In January 2026, the UK government granted planning permission for the redevelopment of Royal Mint Court in London into a Chinese embassy complex, described in the media as a "mega-embassy". In response to the news, Cheung stated that the decision means "more interference, more influence operations and more intimidations of people like me".

== Arrest warrant ==
On 24 December 2024, Chinese authorities added Cheung to their ever-growing list of Wanted Persons of National Security Cases.She woke up on Christmas morning to a bombardment of texts and calls from her friends, but instead of wishes of holiday cheer, they were warnings of the HK$1,000,000 bounty on her head. Accused of ‘incitement to secession’ and ‘collusion with foreign forces’, Cheung is officially the youngest wanted person by the Hong Kong Police and Chinese Government. Pictured on the arrest warrant is a black and white image of Cheung at eleven years old— the only photo that the government appears to have on file for her.

In response, Cheung took to social media to make her statement on the news. She posted a picture of the warrant and wrote how it is a “profound honour” to be the third Hong Konger to receive the $1 million reward. Instead of cowering in fear, she exclaimed that the repression will not silence her and that this warrant will only make her become braver and stronger. She signs off the post with a message to the Chinese regime: “Finally, I want to ask: How fragile, incompetent, and cowardly does a regime have to be to believe that a 19-year-old, ordinary Hong Konger like me could "endanger" and "separatize" the country? And how panicked does it have to be to offer a million-dollar reward for my arrest?”.

== Involvement with the United Nations ==
On 11 March 2025, Chloe Cheung spoke before the UK Parliament Human Rights Committee on her experiences as an overseas bounty activist and the nature of transnational repression. She testified about the mental, emotional, and physical effects that she has suffered since being listed as a wanted person by the Hong Kong Government. She shared that “fear has now become part of [her] daily reality”, referring to the time that she was followed to a restaurant by two suspicious Chinese individuals and the need for her to carry self-protection devices at all times. She highlighted the way that the warrant has affected her social connections in immense ways, as many of her friends and family back in Hong Kong have completely cut off contact with her in fear of punishment by the Hong Kong government.

During this address, Cheung also expressed her frustration with the UK Government for the lack of support. She recounted the letter she wrote to Dan Jarvis, the Minister of State for Security, which questioned the lack of protection measures for bounty activists in the UK. She also questioned the Government on what their response would be if something happened to her or another bounty activist. She never received a formal or direct response to her questions. The Government merely responded with the statement that the UK does not tolerate any intimidation or threats towards any individual living in the UK.

On 30 July 2025, the UN published the UN Transnational Repression in the UK Report. This report recounted the personal anecdotes and concerns from Cheung’s testimony. The report included several recommendations that Cheung proposed. First, it recommended implementing better procedures to protect those accused of politically motivated crimes from extradition. Second, the report recommended setting up a multilingual phone hotline staffed with personnel who specialize in dealing with cross-border repression cases. Finally, it recommended mechanisms to protect people from a politically-guided use of the Interpol Red Notice.
