= Hong Kong Democratic Independence Union =

Party in Taiwan for Hong Kong independence

Hong Kong Democratic Independence Union 香港民主建國聯盟
- President: Alan Keung
- Founder: Alan Keung
- Founded: November 2024
- Dissolved: 2 December 2025 (banned in Hong Kong)
- Headquarters: Taipei, Taiwan
- Ideology: Hong Kong independence Conservative liberalism Anti-communism; Hong Kong nationalism
- Political position: Centre-Right to Right-wing

Hong Kong Democratic Independence Union (Chinese: 香港民主建國聯盟; also as Hong Kong Democratic Independence Alliance; HKDIU or HKDIA) is a party in Taipei, Taiwan. It was established in 2024 and advocates Hong Kong independence. Four party members were arrested in Hong Kong by national security police in July 2025 for "subversion" and "secession", and the party was subsequently banned in December for endangering national security.

== History ==
Hong Kong Democratic Independence Union, Chinese name of which shares similarity with the largest pro-establishment party Democratic Alliance for the Betterment and Progress of Hong Kong, was formed in November 2024 in Taipei, Taiwan. Led by Alan Keung Ka-wai, an activist who was previously jailed for security crimes in Hong Kong, the party aimed to send eight members for the upcoming Hong Kong Parliament election.

HKDIA advocates for the independence of Hong Kong, an act banned under the security law, and recruits members online. In February 2025 during an online news conference in Taiwan, some of the party members pledged to "end the Communist Party" and "Liberate Hong Kong". On 1 July, the party announced the "FDNOL Constitution framework" as part of the advocacy, and held an activity abroad that involves the protest anthem Glory to Hong Kong and desecration of Chinese and Hong Kong's official flags.

=== Arrest and ban ===
The national security police in Hong Kong confirmed that four people aged between 15 and 47 years were arrested on 9 July 2025 for subversion, including the party secretary, a council member, and two general members. The police said their digital devices indicated their activities in Hong Kong, such as designing temporary national flag and anthem, studying the possible assistance from foreign nations, and planning to provide military training for overseas Hongkongers. The police have also found a proposal to urge the United States to devise plans to save Hong Kong political prisoners. Secessionist flags of East Turkestan, Tibet, and Cantonia, as well as flags calling for Hong Kong's secessionism were seized. Piles of newspapers of former pro-democracy Apple Daily were found as well. Three of the arrested were later charged with secession and remanded in jail.

HKDIA condemned the government's abuse of the security law and the suppression of freedom and human rights on its Facebook page.

=== Possible leak ===
The police in Hong Kong said HKDIA contacted members through social media and secret messaging platforms capable of commanding henchmen in Hong Kong, in addition to organising regular meetings for exchanging views. Following the arrest, three candidates of the Hong Kong Parliament election posted on social media that the arrest is caused by a leak of messaging record, blaming the "unencrypted" app and public groups used by the party. The trio and chairman Au Wing-hong resigned from the party.

=== Banned in Hong Kong ===
The government in November 2025 confirmed they were planning to declare HKDIU and another overseas group Hong Kong Parliament "prohibited organisations" under the Safeguarding National Security Ordinance for the first time since the law was enacted. The two organisations were accused of aiming "to subvert state power". Following the seven days given by the authorities for the groups to make their case, the government issued an official ban to the duo on 2 December. Aiding or joining the group may face up to 14 years in jail.

== See also ==
- Hong Kong independence
  - Hong Kong National Party
  - Hong Kong Indigenous
- 2020 Hong Kong national security law
