= Timeline of the 2019–2020 Hong Kong protests (December 2019) =

December events of the 2019–2020 pro-democracy demonstrations in Hong Kong

Timeline of the 2019–2020 Hong Kong protests
2019			March–June				July	August	September	October	November	December
2020	January	February	March	April	May	June	July	August	September	October	November	December
2021	January	February	March	April	May	June	July	August	September–November			December

After the rapid deterioration of the overall situation in the city in the course of the previous months of the 2019–2020 Hong Kong protests, a degree of calming of the protests occurred in December 2019. This was due to several factors. One was an initial expectation of the protesters and their supporters that the government would finally offer concessions on the Five Demands – apart from the withdrawn extradition bill – after the resounding defeat of the pro-establishment camp in the District Council Elections on 24 November, which had dealt a blow to government rhetoric about its public support. The mass protests on 8 December were largely an expression of dissatisfaction that these concessions had not been forthcoming. Another factor seen as responsible for the decrease in the size of the protests was that the arrests during the Siege of Polytechnic University had thinned the ranks of the protesters.

With the Christmas season, protests increasingly moved into shopping malls. Police continued to draw condemnation for their tactics, which were widely seen as disproportionate. In a Facebook post on Christmas Day, Chief Executive Carrie Lam accused "a group of reckless and selfish rioters" of having "ruined" Christmas Eve celebrations for many locals and tourists.

== Events ==
=== 1 December: March ===
Around 200 people marched from Edinburgh Place to the government headquarters protesting against police use of tear gas. Many of the group carried yellow balloons. The demonstration was peaceful.

Hundreds of people marched along Lower Albert Road to just below the US consulate, to thank President Donald Trump for signing the Hong Kong Human Rights and Democracy Act. Some were wearing Trump masks. Police had barred them from going up Garden Road.

In Chater Garden there was a march, with some holding US national flags and placards calling on President Trump to "make Hong Kong great again".

Tens of thousands of people gathered for anti-government protesters in Tsim Sha Tsui at the clock tower to march to the Hong Kong Coliseum in Hung Hom, with protesters blocking the road. The protesters chanted "five demands, not one less" and other slogans. By around 6.30 pm most of the protesters and police had dispersed.

Masked people in Whampoa smashed traffic lights and restaurants which apparently threatened the protest movement. A large group of unmasked people had earlier gathered to heckle and mock police officers for several hours. Bricks and other debris were thrown all over the road in a bid to block traffic and barricades were used to block Hung Hom Road and Tak Man Street.

In Mong Kok protesters set up a makeshift road block and set it on fire.

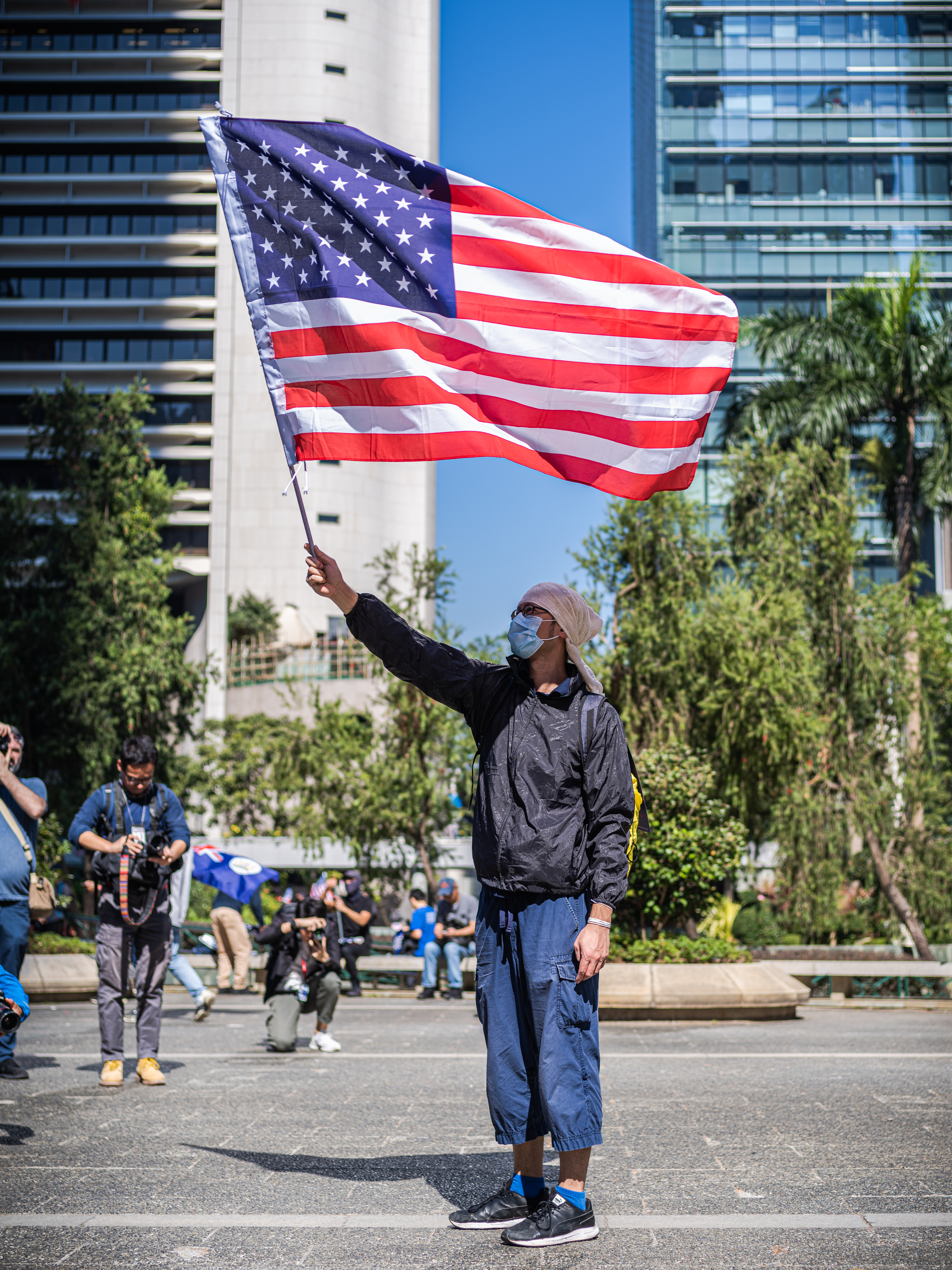
A protester waving an American flag

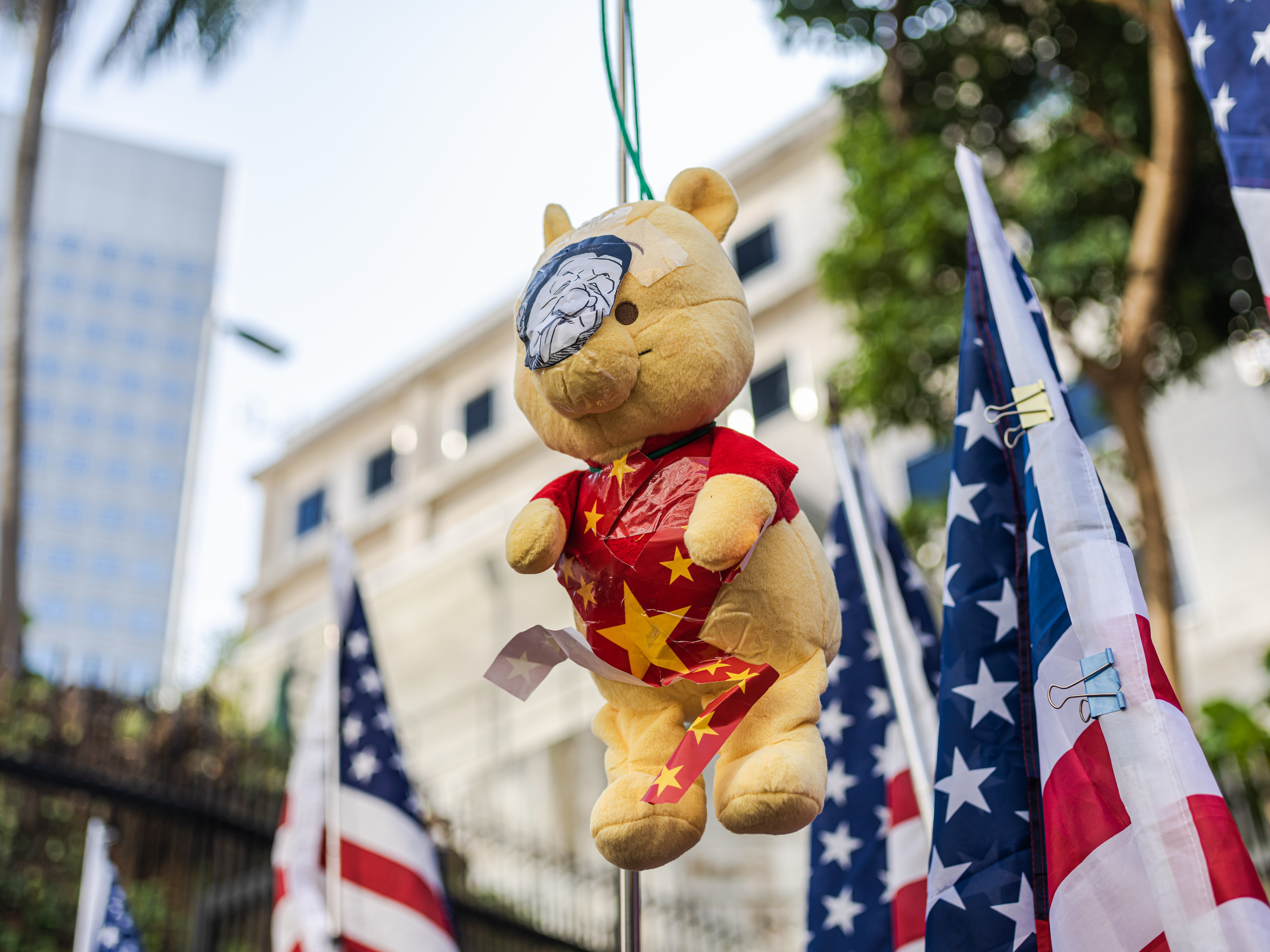
A Winnie the Pooh toy used to symbolise Xi Jinping with the Chinazi flag stuck to it

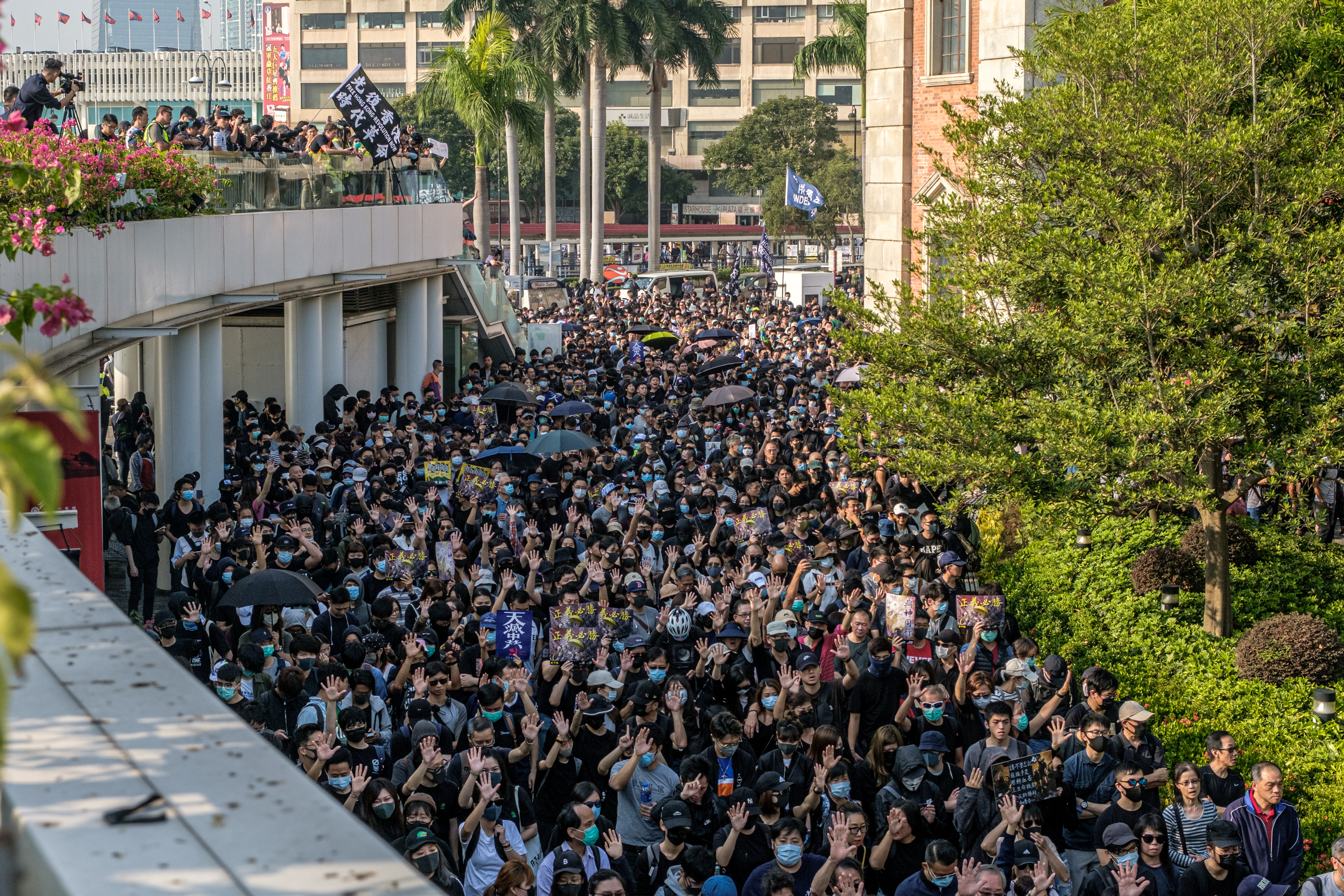
Protesters raising their hands with their palms open chanting "Five Demands, Not One Less"

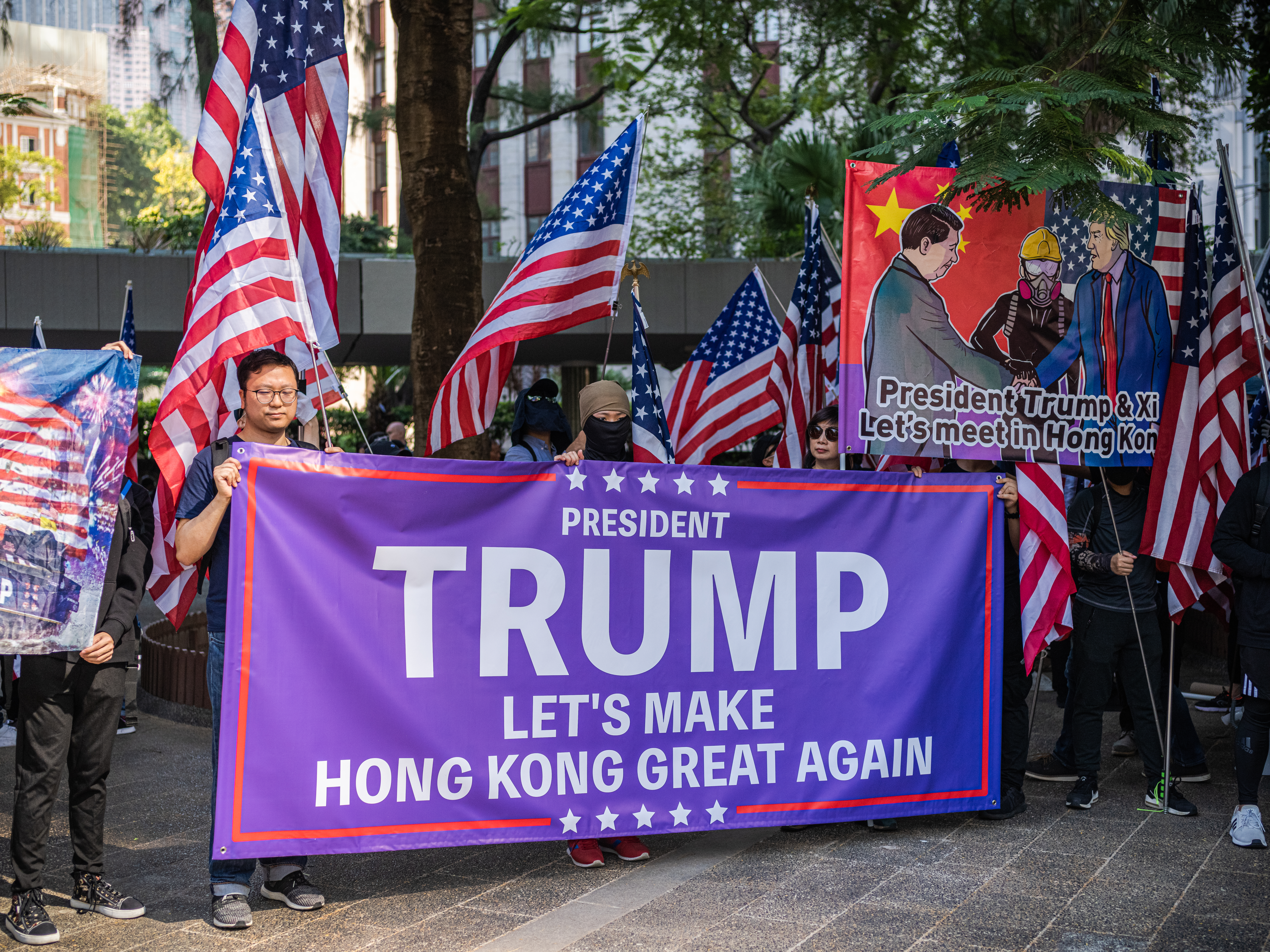
Protesters holding a sign saying "Let's make Hong Kong great again"

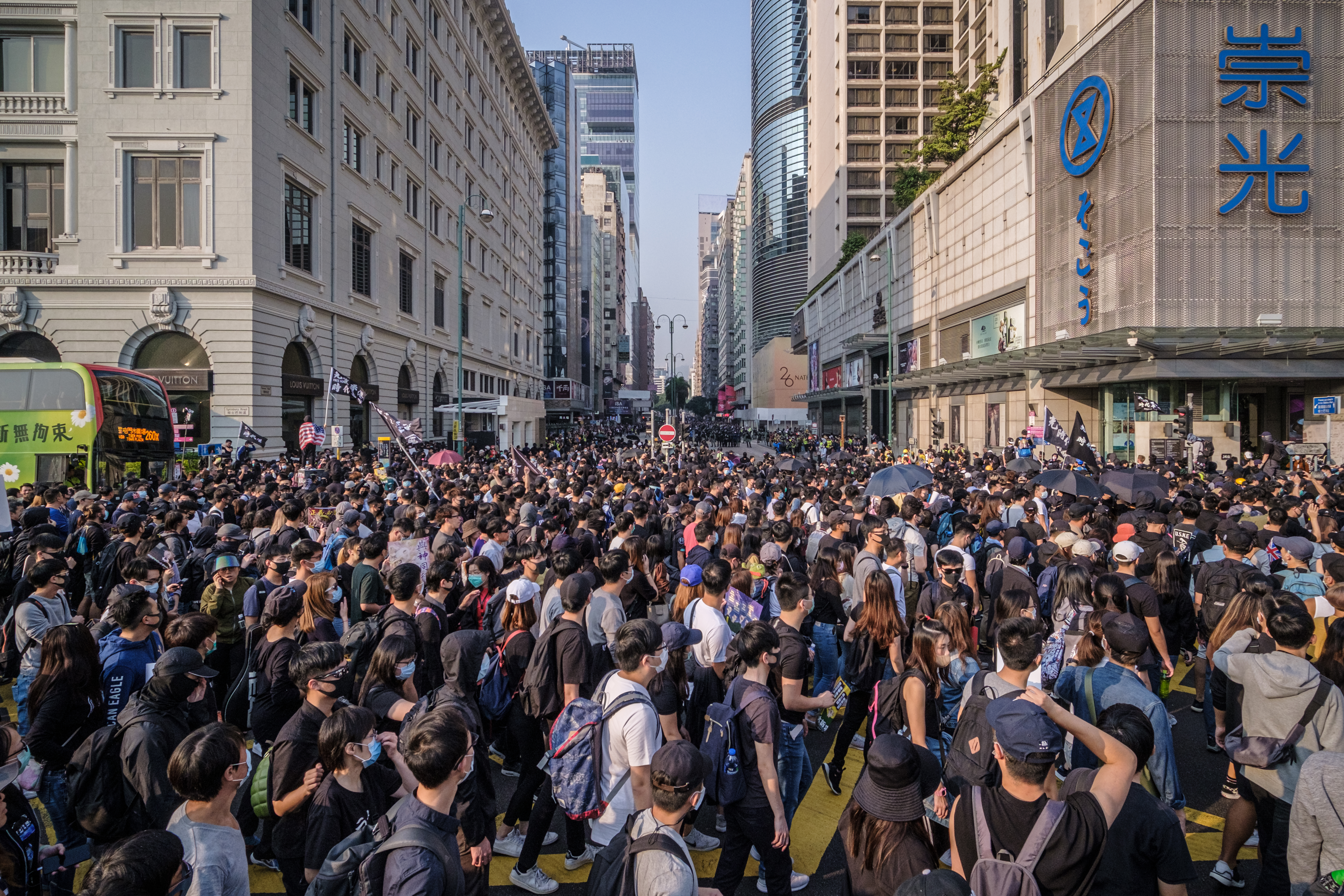
Protesters waving banners and holding umbrella

=== 2 December ===
More than two dozen people outside Immigration Tower protested the detention and deportation of an Indonesian helper who had been active at protest sites. The government claimed she did not extend her two-year visa, while protestors contended she had forgotten, and suggested she be given a second chance, as visa violators sometimes are.

=== 4 December ===
About 30 people gathered in Cheung Sha Wan business district chanting slogans. The crowd grew to about 100 people at its peak.

=== 6 December ===
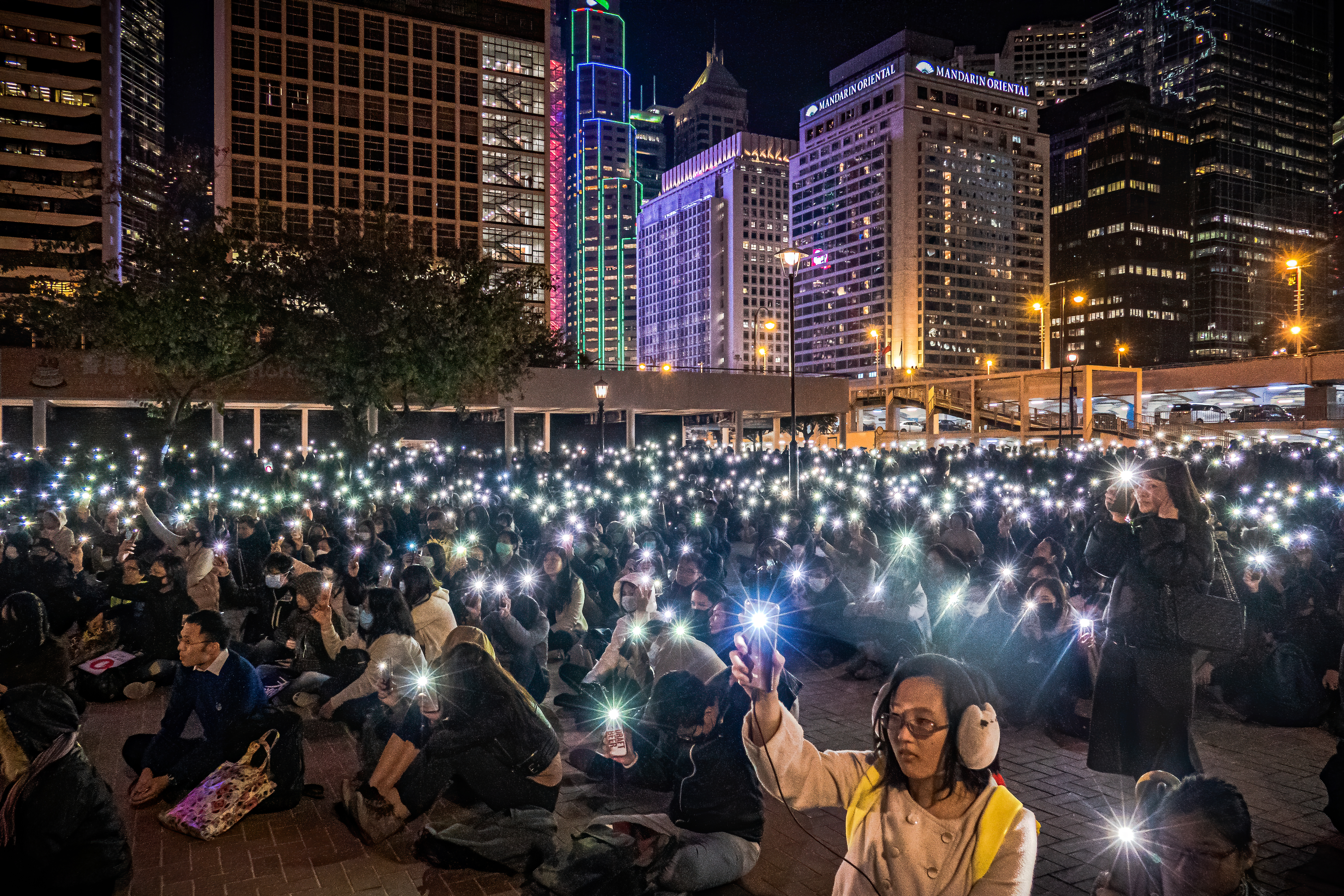
Protesters on 6 December

Thousands of people took part in a rally in Central against the widespread use of tear gas by police during protests across Hong Kong. A solidarity protest of dozens of secondary school students from different schools took place in Kwai Tsing.

=== 8 December: Mass protest ===
External videos
- Video of protesters (Reddit)

A huge march, organised by the Civil Human Rights Front, marched from Victoria Park to Central. Riot police were on standby outside the Central Market to stop protesters from moving further west. They also deployed a water cannon truck, and warned on social media that they would apply a zero-tolerance policy towards any violent or otherwise illegal acts.

Some protesters carried British and British Hong Kong flags, placards demanding full democracy or "Five Demands, Not One Less". One protester was dressed as Winnie the Pooh to mock Communist Party general secretary Xi Jinping. Many protesters expressed anger because the Chief Executive, Carrie Lam, and Beijing have ruled out any further concessions despite the landslide defeat in District Council elections.

Fires were set at the entrances to the High Court and the Court of Final Appeal. Shops, restaurants and banks deemed pro-Beijing were also vandalised during the protest.

The Civil Human Rights Front (CHRF) said 800,000 people took part but police put the peak at 183,000 people.

The convener of the CHRF, Jimmy Sham, denounced the police for instigating fear and terror among the protesters. The police were reported to have raised the 'black flag' (which signifies that tear gas will be deployed) before the march started.

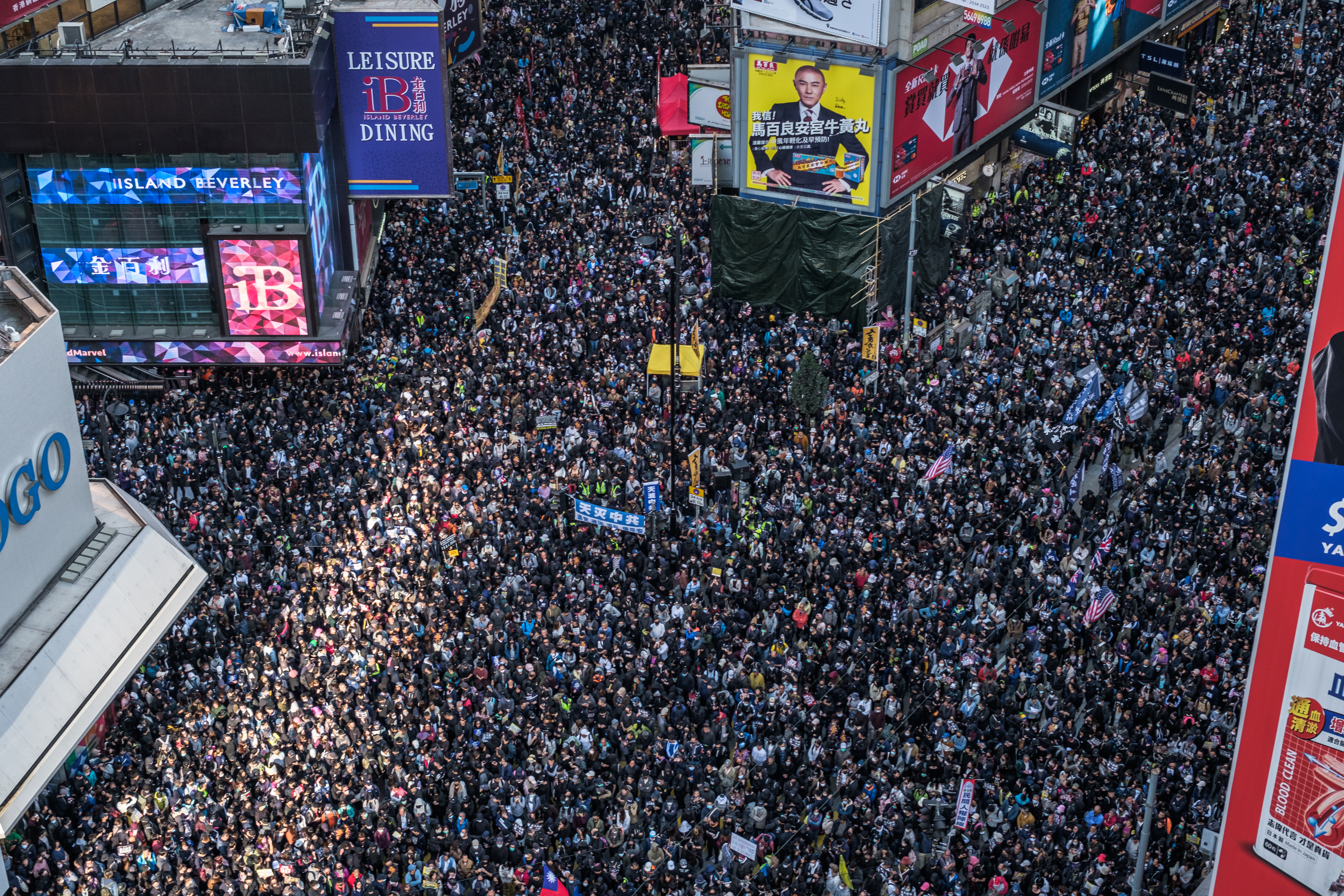
Protesters flooding the streets

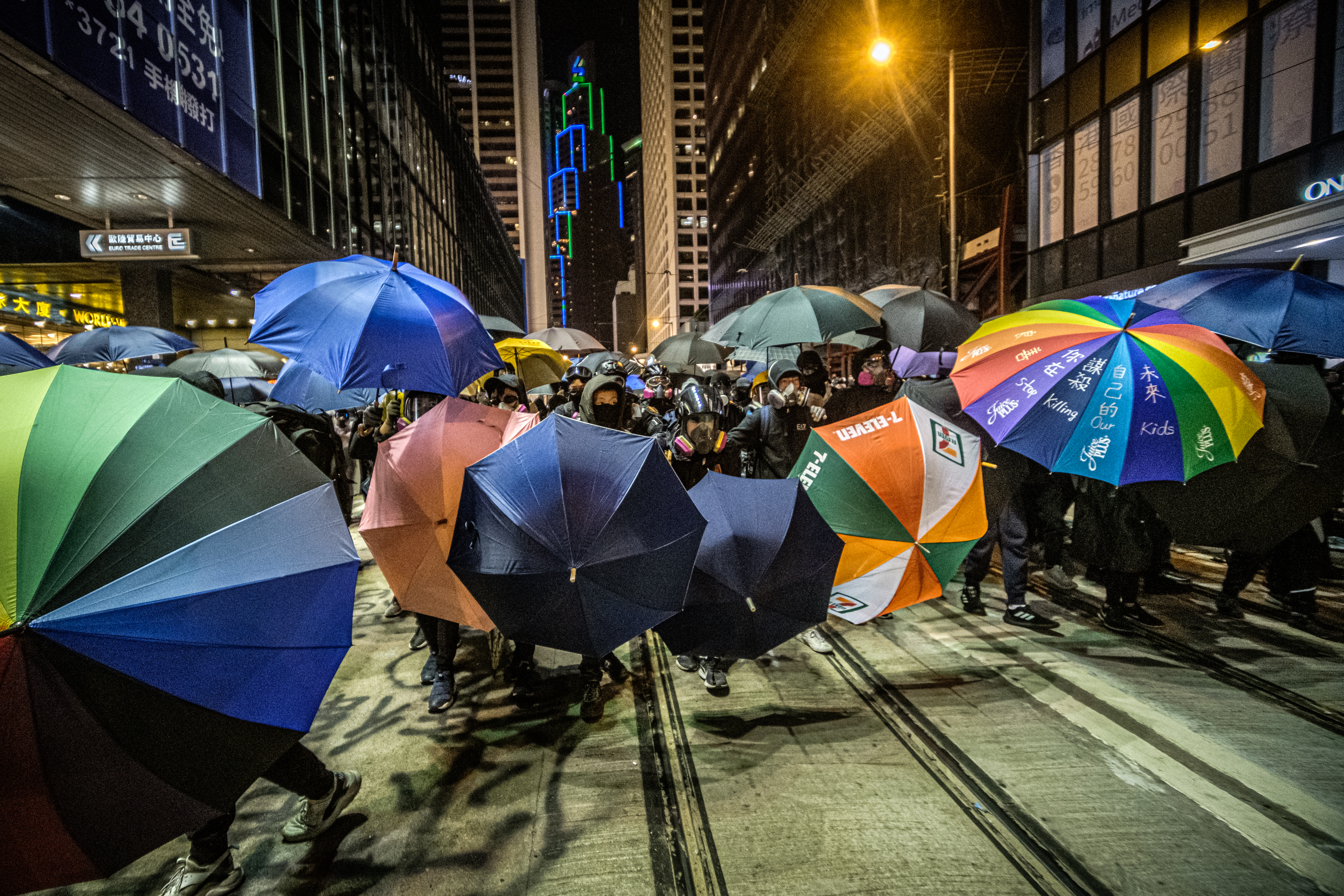
Protesters using umbrellas

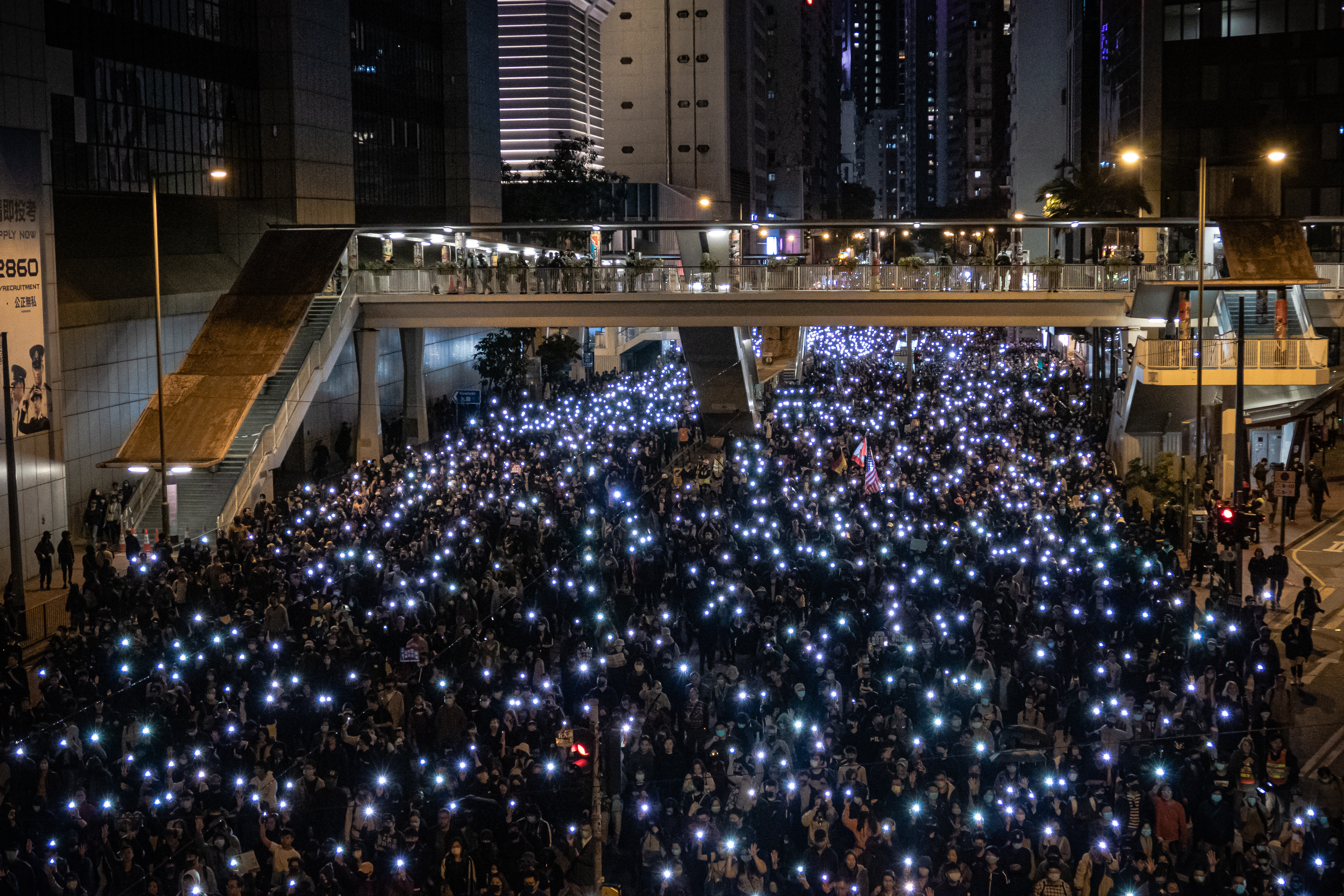
Protesters at night

=== 11 December ===
Over a hundred people gathered outside the British Consulate General in Admiralty urging the UK government to act in support of the protest movement. They called on the UK to terminate the Sino-British Joint Declaration, saying this would mean Beijing no longer had sovereignty over the city and to rejoin the Commonwealth. The rally organiser said they handed a petition to a representative of the consulate – just hours ahead of the general election.

This follows John Bercow former Speaker of The House saying "For the international community, and especially Britain, it is clear: Hong Kong is the new frontline in the struggle for freedom".

=== 12 December ===
A crowd of 58,000 protesters gathered at Edinburgh Place, in Central, to mark six months since the protests on 12 June. The protesters said they will continue their fight until their five demands are met, and will not distance themselves from more radical protesters.

A hill-top vertical protest banner was hung by Hong Kong citizens on Beacon Hill today to support the protest. This vertical protest banner seemed to be the same yellow vertical protest banner "Citizens' Faces Masked, Carrie Lam's Heart Enshrouded" (「市民蒙面林鄭蒙心」) used on 19 October.

=== 14 December: Foiled bomb plots ===
Several dozen people staged a rally outside the British consulate calling on London to declare that the Sino-British Joint Declaration is no longer valid. The demonstrators, some waving British and colonial flags, said "such a move would allow Hong Kong people to decide their own future".

In 2017, the Foreign Ministry in Beijing declared that the joint declaration no longer had any realistic meaning and it was merely an historical document, while the British government insisted that the treaty had remained in force – a point it made again shortly after the current protests began in June, when it also demanded that Beijing continue to abide by the agreement.

On 14 December, the Hong Kong Police also released a statement that a second bomb plot within a week had been foiled and three men had been arrested in Tuen Mun, on suspicion of testing explosive devices and chemicals. The homemade, remote-controlled devices were intended for use at mass protests. Protective gear, shields, bulletproof vests and gas masks were also recovered at the scene.

The police also released a statement stating they had arrested three males and two females aged 15 to 18 on suspicion of Luo Changqing's murder earlier in November, as well as rioting and wounding. Luo was a 70-year-old man hit by a brick while observing a conflict between protesters and government supporters, who were throwing bricks at one another.

=== 15 December ===
More than 200 people gathered in Edinburgh Place in Central on Sunday to rally support for a planned three-day strike by the social welfare sector. Organisers said the strike – due to run from 17 to 19 December – "is necessary to inspire others to rethink the impact of the industrial action and whether the move can prevent youngsters from risking their lives and future fighting in the front line of protests".

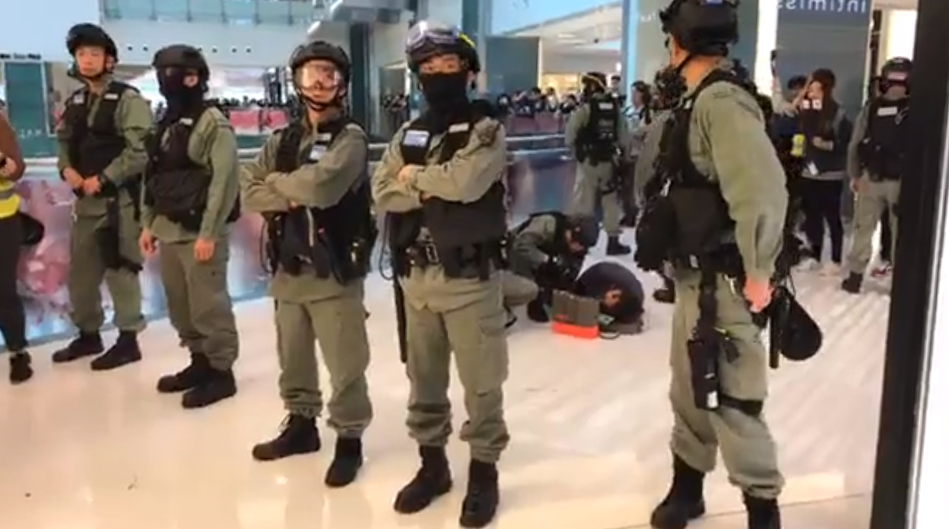
Police guarding a man being arrested

Large crowds of people lined up in Admiralty to pay their respects to a man who fell to his death six months ago. Marco Leung died on 15 June after hanging banners bearing slogans against the now-withdrawn extradition bill, shortly after Carrie Lam had announced that the legislation was being suspended. He had fallen from a high platform, missing a huge inflated cushion set up on the ground by firefighters. People came with candles and flowers to the spot where he died, some holding placards echoing some of Leung's final words, like "We are not rioters."

A protest turned violent at a Sha Tin mall as black-clad demonstrators vandalised restaurants, smashed up glass barriers, and confronted people with apparently conflicting opinions at the New Town Plaza shopping centre. A woman was spray-painted in the face and another fell down, after apparently trying to stop demonstrators from spraying graffiti at the shopping mall.

=== 16 December ===
Protesters in Mong Kok dug up bricks and scattered them on the road, set a number of small fires in the area, smashed up some traffic lights and threw objects at the police. This prompting police to fire tear gas. A reporter was pepper-sprayed, beaten with batons and pushed up against a wall before the police let him go.

=== 17 December ===
People from the social work sector began a three-day strike to try to pressure the government into responding to the five demands of the protest movement. Around 200 people gathered at Edinburgh Place in Central for the first of a series of events. Participants folded yellow paper helmets to symbolise that social workers feel unable to properly protect young people.

=== 19 December ===
Several hundred people joined a social welfare sector protest calling on the international community to intervene in the "humanitarian crisis" in Hong Kong. The protesters started their approved rally in Wan Chai, and marched to nine different consulates while chanting slogans like "five demands, not one less" and "liberate Hong Kong, revolution of our times". Police were on standby along the route as the demonstrators passed petition letters to consular representatives.

=== 20 December ===
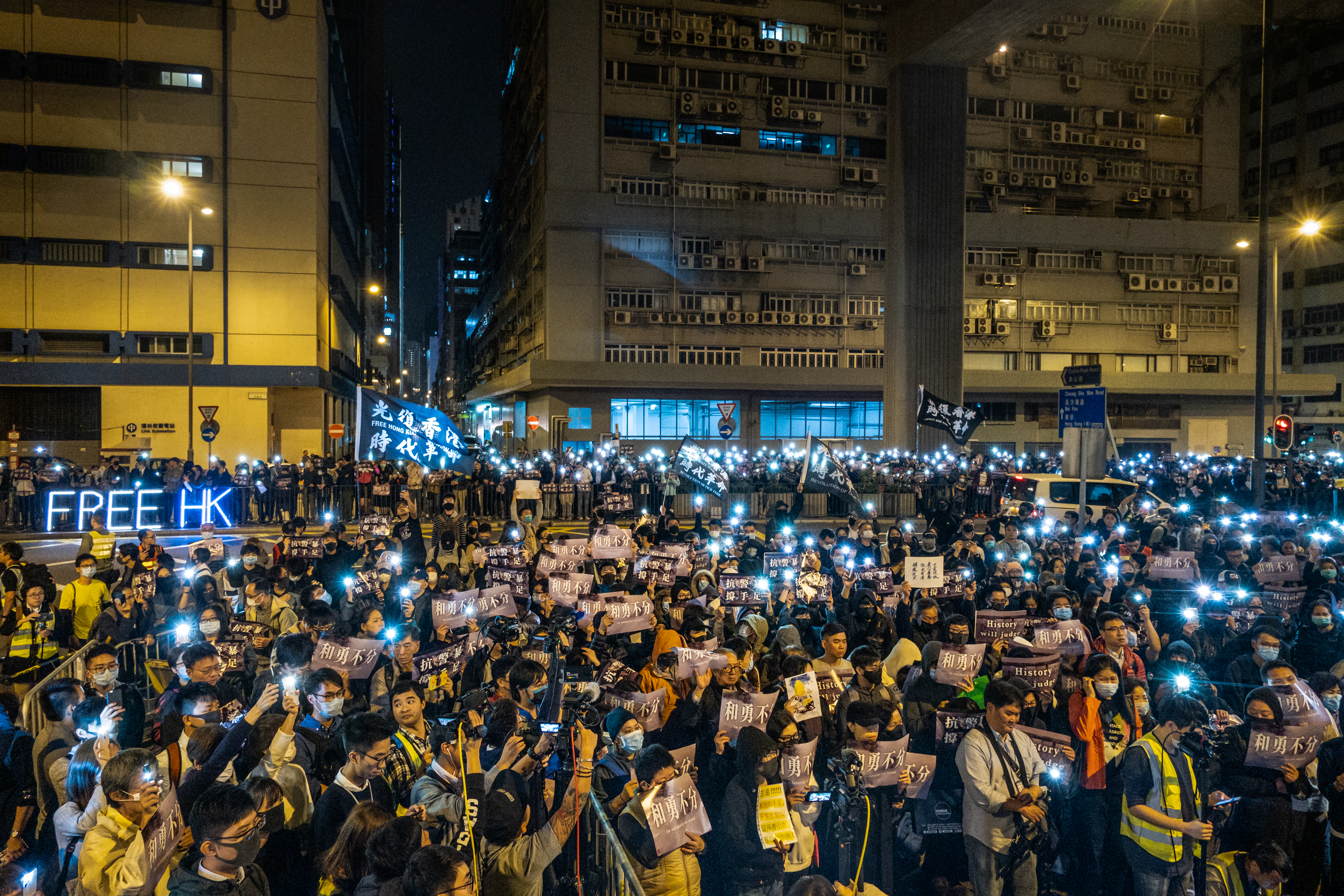
Protesters with flags and a sign that says "FREE HK"

On 20 December, acting on intelligence from the 14 December raid, the Hong Kong Police had an arrest warrant for a 19-year-old suspect wanted on suspicion of firearms offences related to the protest. Upon intercepting the suspect in a residential estate in Tai Po, the man fired one live round at the police from a semi-automatic P80 pistol. During the arrest, protesters attempted to hinder the police and help the suspect escape. The police responded with tear gas.

During a follow-up flat raid, police seized an AR-15 rifle with 211 rounds of ammunition—61 rounds in a speedloader and the rest in five magazines. According to the police statement, the firearms and ammunition found was related to a plot to use the weapons during public assemblies.

At the same time, four people from the Spark Alliance, a group providing financial aid and bail money to protesters, were arrested on suspicion of money laundering, and were shortly released on bail. Officers seized over HK$130,000 in cash, HK$165,000 worth of supermarket coupons, and froze over HK$70 million in funds and insurance products.

People demonstrated near HSBC's headquarters in retaliation to the arrests and seizure. The seizure had rekindled action HSBC had taken on 18 November, to close a business account which was being used by the Spark Alliance, as the account owner was not able to provide documentation to meet Know Your Customer (KYC) and Anti-Money Laundering (AML) compliance requirements as the purpose of the account had changed. The business which opened the account was a pest control company, however the owner had in fact lent the account to the Spark Alliance for fundraising purposes and had significant amounts of money going through. HSBC offered to transfer the funds to another bank but the owner had refused. Protesters outside HSBC called for sanctions against the bank, who was accused was siding with the government and the police. HSBC published a statement on Twitter on 20 December stating that the decision to close the account was "Completely unrelated to the Hong Kong's Police's arrest of the four individuals on 19 December 2019. We closed the account in November 2019 following direct instruction from the customer." Despite this, some protesters still targeted HSBC branches.

=== 21 December ===
Around a hundred protesters gathered at the Yoho Mall near Yuen Long MTR station to mark five months since an attack by an armed group who clobbered dozens of rail passengers on 21 July. Those who attended the rally sang the protest anthem "Glory to Hong Kong" and chanted slogans like "Hong Kong police, shame on you". Thirty-seven people were arrested in connection with the attacks, with seven of them being charged with rioting, on that day. Police ordered people to leave Yoho Mall saying there was a "criminal case" that required investigation after a sushi shop was vandalised. This led to tension between officers and protesters. Many of the shops, which were originally opened for the day, were forced to close their shutters following the arrival of the armed officers.

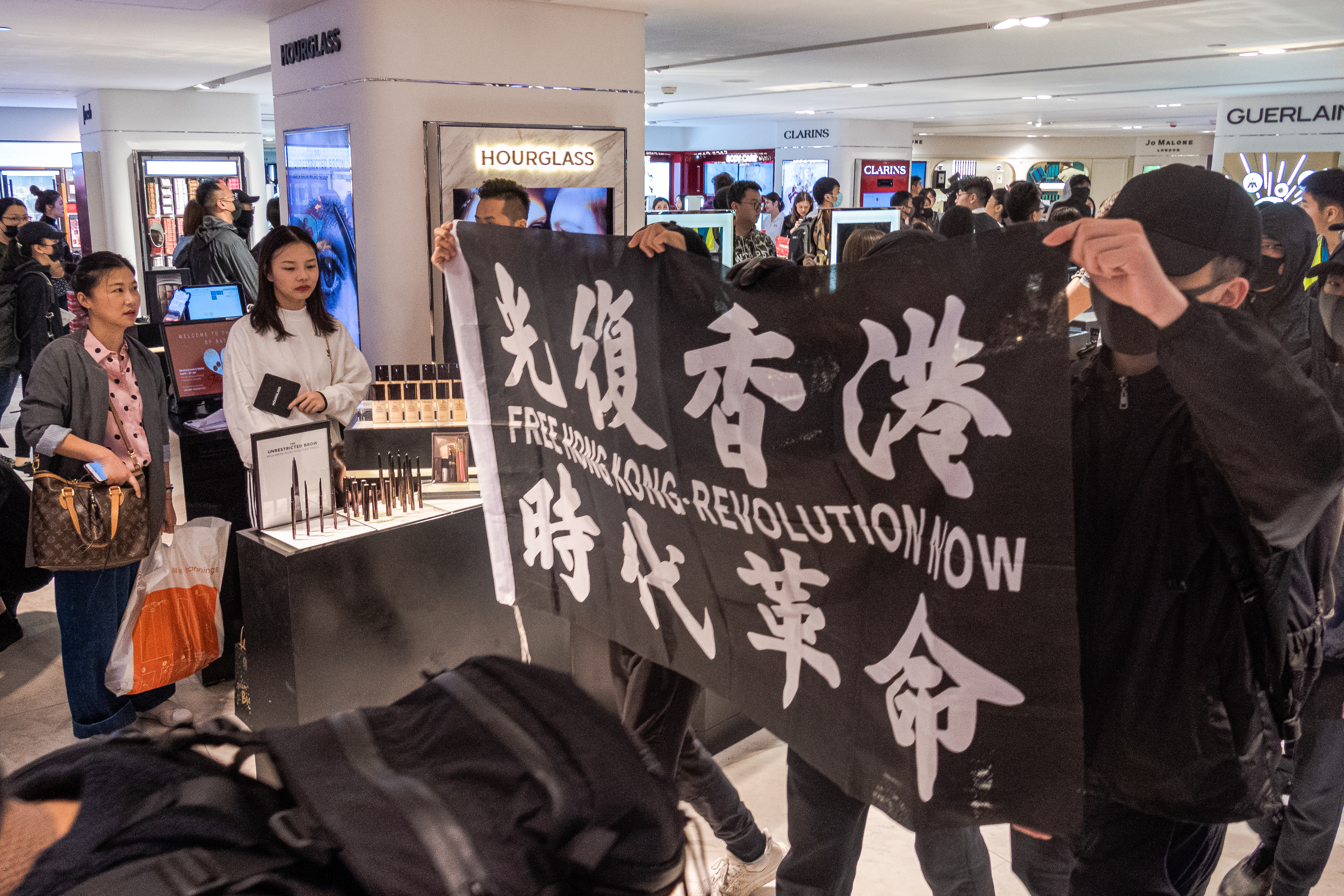
Protesters called the slogan at the Harbour City shopping mall

Dozens of people gathered at the Harbour City shopping mall in Tsim Sha Tsui to take part in a protest titled "Shopping with you during Christmas" called by some online chat groups. The protesters, most of whom were wearing black clothes and masks, gathered near a giant Christmas Tree in the mall and walked around chanting slogans in Cantonese and Putonghua. Some protesters were seen doing "heart" gestures to the policemen who were stationed across the street from the plaza.

=== 22 December ===
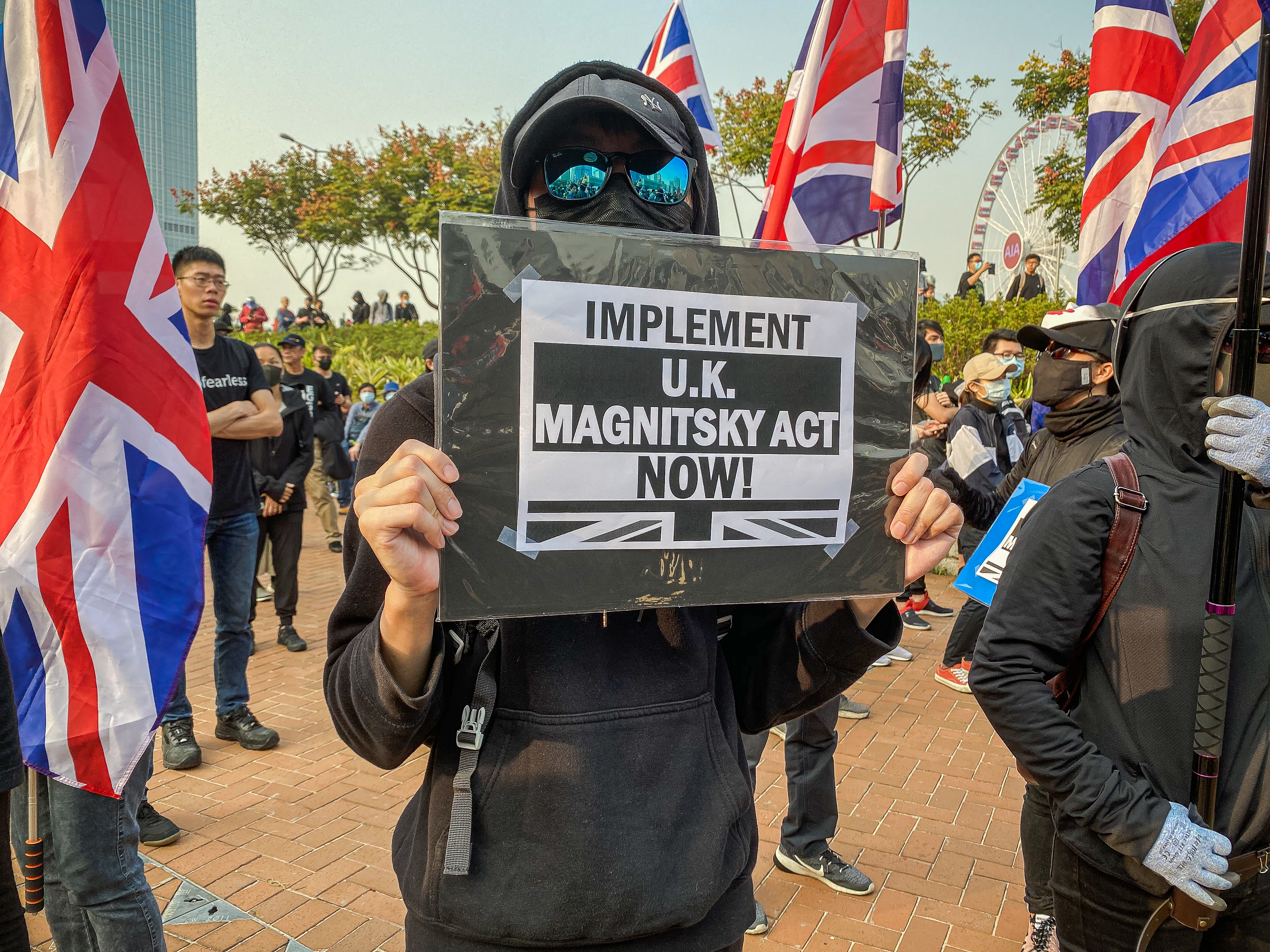
Protesters with British flags

Hundreds of people took part in another rally in support of the Muslim Uighurs, expressing concern that Hong Kong will soon face similar oppression if Beijing tightens its grip on the territory. Some waved flags calling for Hong Kong Independence, others waved American, British, Tibetan or Chinazi flags. Participants chanted slogans such as "Stand with Muslims, stand with freedom". Some yelled out "Hong Kong independence is the only way out!".

The rally was largely peaceful until a small group of black-clad protesters took down the Chinese national flag by City Hall, and replaced it with that of the United States flag. The protesters attempted to burn the flag until the organisers stopped them. Riot police stormed the rally at Edinburgh Place at around 5 pm to rescue the flag. A mob of masked, black clad protesters – some of whom had been waving flags calling for Hong Kong independence – pelted officers with water bottles and other debris as police beat two suspects with batons in the process of subduing them.

A skateboard was seen being thrown at the officers. An officer pulled out and pointed his revolver at the mob at one point when a camera stand was thrown at him, but did not fire and retracted his gun as soon as they backed off. Riot police responded with bursts of pepper spray, while reinforcements quickly arrived, and ordered hundreds of protesters at the rally to leave immediately, declaring that the previously sanctioned gathering had ended and they were now participating in an unlawful assembly. Police fired projectiles as they chased people onto a footbridge over Connaught Road Central. One man was hit by what's thought to be rubber bullets. Many people were subsequently stopped and searched at the area. In a statement, police said officers were arresting a man when a large group of "radical protesters had hurled hard objects and assaulted police officers with intent to help the arrestee escape." The force said officers used the minimum necessary force to disperse the protesters.

=== 23 December ===
Local musicians began a five-day strike, calling on the government to respond to the five core demands of the protests. Dozens of people rallied at Chater Garden in Central to mark the start of the strike, singing songs and chanting slogans. Martin Lau, organiser of the rally, pointed out that as the Christmas period was the busiest season of the year in the music industry, a strike during this period would have a big impact.

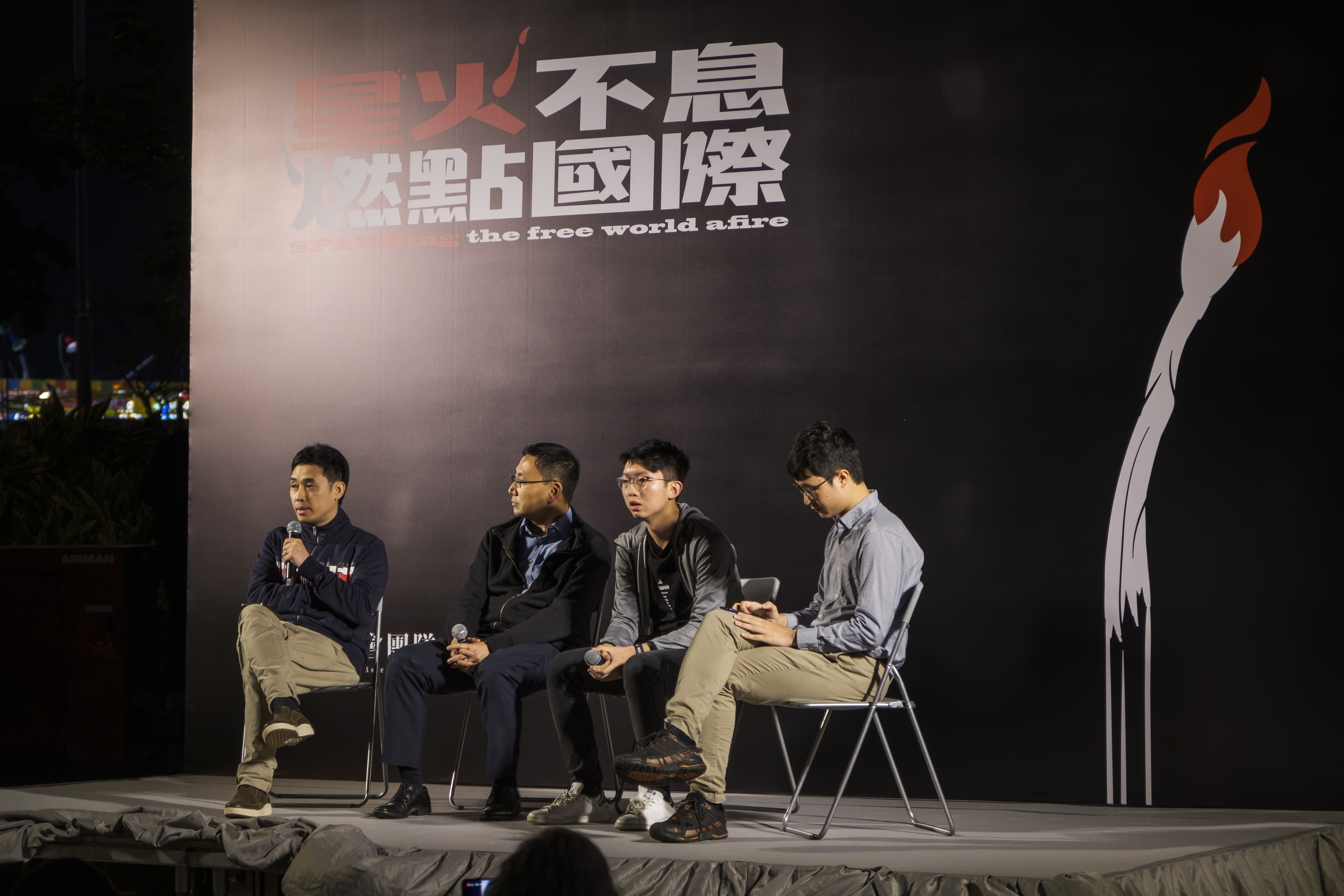
Over a thousand people rallied in Central in support of Spark Alliance HK

Over a thousand people rallied in Central in support of Spark Alliance HK, a group which provides financial aid and bail money to arrested protesters. Last week police moved to freeze the alliance's bank account due to alleged money laundering. Lawyers and protesters at the rally accused the police of suppressing the ongoing protests by making up the allegation. The rally's organisers also called on the US government to sanction pro-Beijing companies that are found to have violated human rights when they move money offshore, and limit their use of the US dollar to clear their international transactions.

Dozens of office workers in Central continued the lunchtime protests chanting slogans at a luxury mall, calling on officials to accept the demands of protesters. They denounced the police and the Department of Justice, saying they have abused their power to arrest and charge protesters. Some chanted slogans such as "Hong Kong would be a better place without policemen".

=== 24 December: Christmas Eve ===
Dozens of black-clad protesters held a "Shopping With You" protest across major shopping malls and districts in the city, where they visited restaurants, shops and banks that they have labelled as "blue ribbon". Their tactics ranged from vandalising property to causing general nuisance and intimidating customers.

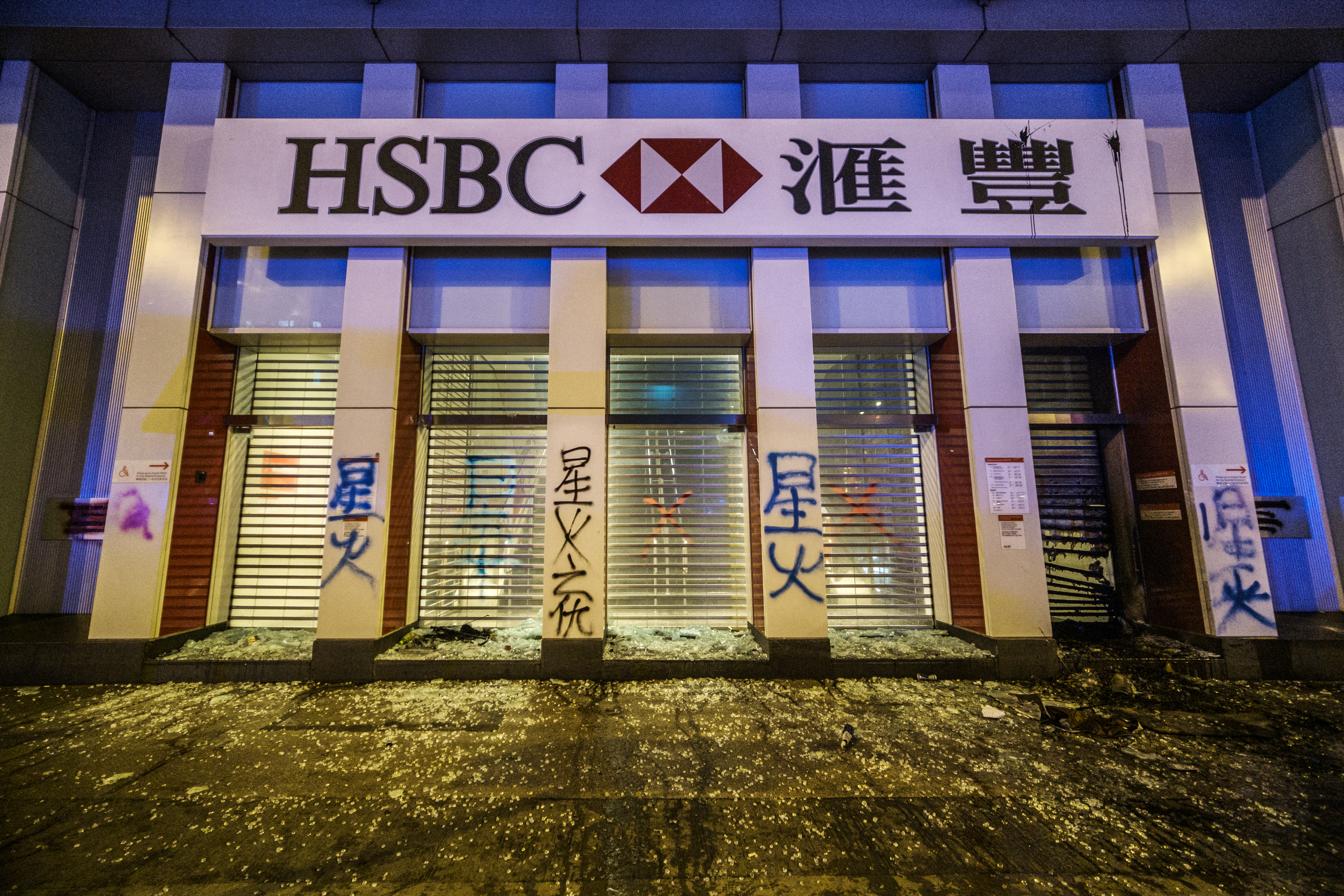
A HSBC branch in Mong Kok is destroyed

Some protesters also targeted a HSBC branch in Mong Kok, smashing up glass doors and setting a small fire inside. They spray-painted the message 'don't forget Spark Alliance' on the walls of the building. This was in retaliation to HSBC closing an account which was being used by the Spark Alliance. Protesters set debris on fire at one of the MTR entrances at Mong Kok station, smashed up a glass door of the HSBC building, and set a small fire inside.

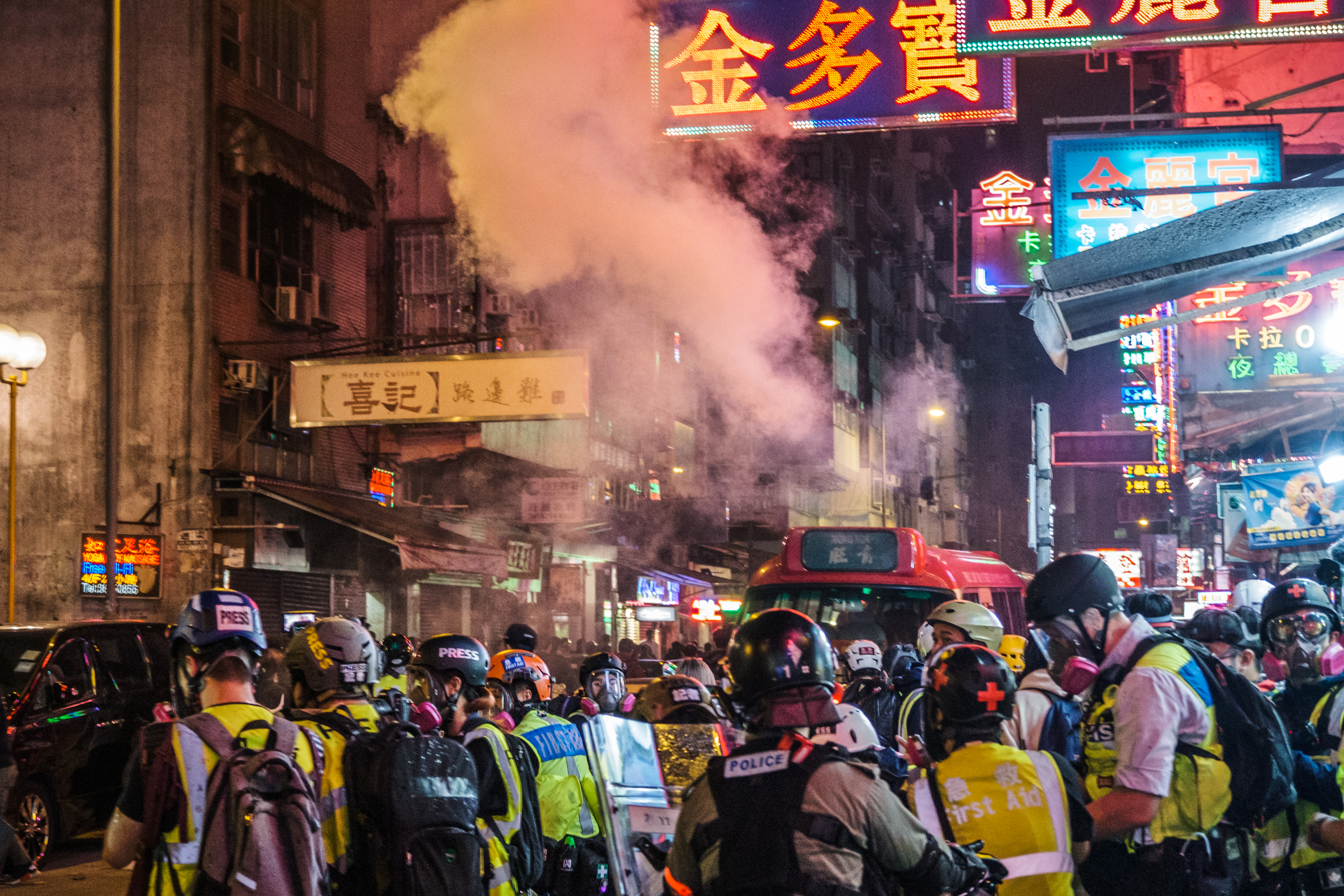
Police fired multiple rounds of tear gas

Police fired multiple rounds of tear gas in Tsim Sha Tsui, stating that "rioters" had thrown petrol bombs at the Tsim Sha Tsui police station. Clashes broke out inside a mall, as large crowds of people had gathered in response to online calls to target shopping centres across Hong Kong. Meanwhile, in the Harbour City shopping centre, protesters fought with plainclothes police after officers subdued a number of people. The plain clothed officers used batons to beat back a group of protesters, striking some repeatedly, while yelling at people to stop throwing objects at them. Live footage showed an officer raising his shotgun up at people as scores of back up officers arrived.

Numerous clashes happened in crowded shopping centres where protesters collided with police troops Tuesday night while police continued using tear gas. One protester was injured after jumping from the first floor of the shopping mall in an attempt to evade capture. Police placed a "blue flag" in the mall, meaning the gatherings there became illegal.

=== 25 December: Christmas Day ===
Police charged at a crowd of protesters in Mong Kok firing tear gas and making at least two arrests, as tensions rose for several hours. Officers and members of the public had been hurling abuse at each other before the sudden burst of violence. A group of reporters had pepper spray fired at them. Police ran at the crowd once again, making at least five further arrests. A group of protesters gathered to go on a "shopping" rampage. Riot police surrounded them arguing and trading insults with protesters, shoppers and passers-by. Several bystanders were pepper sprayed at various points. By evening, scores of people were gathered in the streets near the mall, some waving US and Hong Kong independence flags.

=== 26 December: Boxing Day ===
Protesters in a shopping mall "Moko atrium" heckled clients at cafes and restaurants owned by mainland-Chinese companies, including Pacific Coffee and Urban Bakery, yelling and forcing people to leave. Also, demonstrators threw potted plants at police officers. Police were searching for big groups of people.

=== 27 December ===
A gathering of about 20 young people who responded to online calls to "study" took place at a shopping mall in Sha Tin. The participants wore masks and dressed in black. Security guards and plainclothes police officers were on standby at the mall but no arrests or violence occurred.

=== 28 December ===
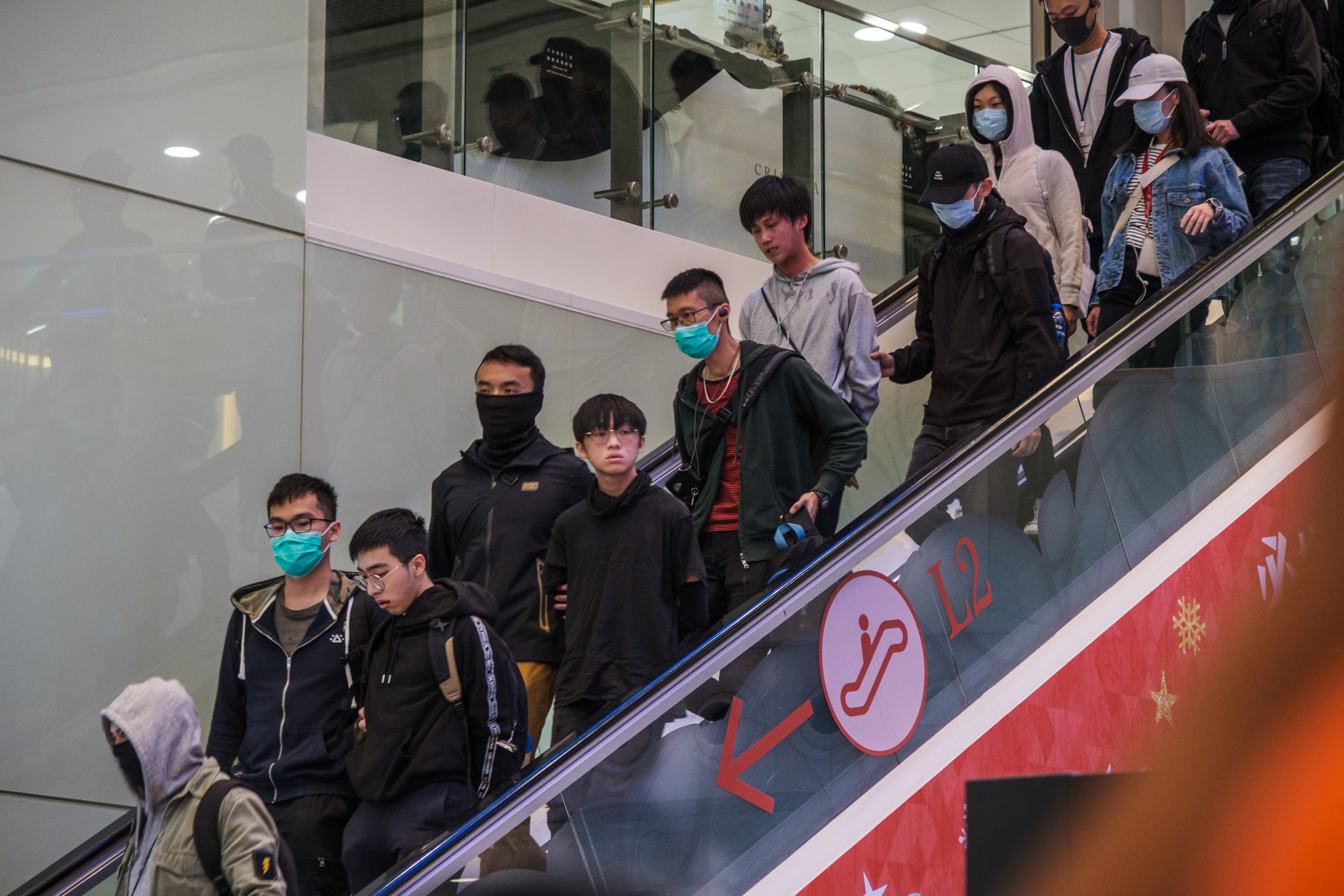
Protesters were arrested by police officers in Sheung Shui

In Sheung Shui, as part of the "Shopping With You" protest, pro-democracy protesters attacked elderly shoppers and targeted mainland Chinese shoppers. Some of the protesters mocked shoppers, saying "Hong Kong is dangerous" and shouted at them to go back to China. Some also kicked at shopping bags and trolleys of few shoppers. Riot police were called to the mall where protesters were causing disruption to shops and customers.

=== 31 December: New Year's Eve ===
==== Protests at Prince Edward station and in Central ====
A number of people gathered at Prince Edward MTR station to mark four months since riot police stormed the station on 31 August, an event which had given rise to rumours that some people had been killed inside the MTR station. Although the Hong Kong government had repeatedly stated that rumours of fatalities occurring at Prince Edward Station on 31 August were completely false, it had not succeeded in convincing many protesters. A group of people who believed that people had been killed placed white flowers at the entrance closest to the Mong Kok police station. Police officers then came and cleaned up the flowers. Protesters then proceeded to put more flowers in an act of defiance. Riot police at around 7 pm entered the station pepper spraying and detained several people, ordering the other protesters to leave. Protesters two hours later occupied Nathan Road despite police warning that they may use rubber bullets and bean bag rounds. A water cannon was then used to break up the protest.

In Central around 50 people held a lunch time demonstration. The protesters gathered on a bridge chanting anti-police and pro-democracy slogans, and calling on passers-by to attend a New Year's Day march from Victoria Park.

==== International response: Open letter to Carrie Lam urges probe into allegations of police misconduct ====
Some 38 political dignitaries from 18 countries, including former British House of Commons Speaker John Bercow and former British Foreign Secretary Malcolm Rifkind, urged Chief Executive Carrie Lam to set up an independent probe into police violence, calling the use of tear gas and pepper spray during the Christmas holidays "horrifying". They stated that should the Hong Kong government not heed their demand, they would call on the international community to establish an enquiry mechanism. They also warned of the possibility of calls for Magnitsky sanctions against responsible officials in Hong Kong in that case. In response, on 1 January shortly after midnight the Hong Kong government issued a long rebuttal, which suggested that the signatories to the open letter had not sufficiently appreciated "the extent of violence by radical protesters and the attacks they have made on police and citizens", and that an international enquiry mechanism coupled with Magnitsky sanctions would constitute a "gross interference in Hong Kong's governance and autonomy as well as the sovereignty of our nation".

== Counter-demonstrations ==
On 3 December several dozen people protested in a pro-Beijing rally in Central gathering in Chater Garden; they sang the Chinese national anthem and then marched to the US Consulate. They trampled on an American flag as they vented their anger at President Donald Trump for signing the Hong Kong Human Rights and Democracy Act into law. They waved Chinese flags and accused Washington of interfering in China's internal affairs.

On 7 December hundreds of pro-government supporters held a rally in Wan Chai accusing the pan-democrats of using "unscrupulous means to become district councilors", after allegations that candidates did not condemn the violence. They sang the national anthem and chanted slogans at pro-democracy protesters as "cockroaches" and "trash".

On 15 December hundreds of protesters staged a rally at Tamar Park expressing support for the police and against violence. Waving national and SAR flags, the crowd sang songs to try to raise the morale of front line officers. They also held placards calling on the "US to stop destroying Hong Kong's democracy and human rights".
