= Hong Kong Parliament =

Hong Kong Parliament may refer to:

- Legislative Council of Hong Kong, the legislature of Hong Kong
- Hong Kong Parliament (exiled organisation), formerly the Hong Kong Parliament Electoral Organizing Committee, a non-governmental group of pro-democracy Hong Kongers in exile
