= Rubao culture =

Internet meme satirizing Xi Jinping

Rubao culture (Chinese: 辱包文化; pinyin: Rǔbāo wénhuà; lit. 'Bao-insulting culture', also known by the homophone variant, Chinese: 乳包文化; lit. 'Milk Bao culture') is an Internet meme and subculture involving the satire, insult, and ridicule of Xi Jinping, the general secretary of the Chinese Communist Party. The term literally translates to "Insulting the Bun".

This subculture originated from the 2013 Xi Jinping steamed bun event, which led to Xi being nicknamed "Xi Baozi" (Chinese: 习包子; lit. 'Xi the Steamed Bun') or "Emperor Qingfeng" (Chinese: 庆丰帝) by the public. Subsequently, as China's internet censorship mechanisms became increasingly strict, a large volume of satirical works and derivative creations targeting Xi Jinping (referred to by enthusiasts as "Ru products" or "Dairy products", a pun on the homophone) migrated to social media platforms outside the Great Firewall, such as YouTube, Twitter (now X), Telegram, and Reddit.

Media outlets such as Voice of America (VOA) and Radio Free Asia (RFA) have analyzed that Rubao culture is a method used by Chinese internet users to deconstruct political authority, release political dissatisfaction, and construct a group identity among dissidents through "black humor" while facing severe speech censorship and political pressure.

== Background and etymology ==
=== Political background ===
Since Xi Jinping assumed the position of General Secretary of the Chinese Communist Party at the 18th National Congress in 2012, Chinese authorities have progressively strengthened control over online public opinion and exhibited a clear trend toward a personality cult. Following the 2018 Constitutional amendment which removed term limits for the presidency—effectively breaking the abolition of tenure for leading cadres—and the strengthening of social surveillance, public dissatisfaction increased. Because open criticism carries significant political risks, such as arrest or account suspension, netizens turned to using obscure pseudonyms, homophonic puns, and image spoofs to express political dissent. This subculture of deconstructing authority through mockery has been defined by political scientist James C. Scott as a "weapon of the weak" or "hidden transcripts".

=== Etymology ===
The term "Rubao" (Insulting Bao) stems from the nickname "Baozi" (Steamed Bun) for Xi Jinping. On December 28, 2013, Xi Jinping visited a Qingfeng Steamed Dumpling Shop on Yuetan North Street in Xicheng District, Beijing, to wait in line and dine. This act was initially widely publicized by official media like Xinhua News Agency as a political stunt demonstrating a "man of the people" image. However, it subsequently triggered a backlash and over-interpretation online. Some netizens began using terms like "Xi Baozi" (Xi the Steamed Bun), "Baozi", and even "Emperor Qingfeng" to refer to Xi Jinping, mocking the political showmanship and his subsequent centralization of power.

This event also received widespread attention from international media. The Guardian reported at the time that while the lunch was intended to show a common touch, any mockery of it online was swiftly deleted under internet censorship. A commentary in South Korea's The Chosun Ilbo analyzed that the Chinese authorities' sensitive reaction to the term "Baozi" demonstrated their anxiety over losing control of public opinion.

== History and development ==
=== Image spoofs and symbolism ===
In July 2017, when Xi Jinping visited the United States and met with Barack Obama, a photo of the two was likened by netizens to "Winnie the Pooh and Tigger". Because the cartoon character was perceived to resemble Xi Jinping's appearance and physique, related spoof images went viral online. Chinese censorship departments immediately listed "Winnie the Pooh" as a sensitive term; on platforms like WeChat and Sina Weibo, related stickers were removed, and typing the keywords resulted in error messages. This censorship triggered the Streisand effect, turning Winnie the Pooh into a global symbol for mocking Xi Jinping.

=== Political metaphors and taboos ===
During the Two Sessions in March 2018, public opinion erupted again due to suspicions that the draft Constitutional amendment removing term limits for the President was intended to allow Xi Jinping to remain in power indefinitely. On the Chinese Q&A website Zhihu, a user asked, "If a bus driver drives continuously while fatigued without changing shifts, what should the passengers do?" This was widely viewed as an allusion to Xi attempting indefinite tenure. The Beijing Cyberspace Administration subsequently cited this as a reason to accuse Zhihu of lax management, ordering the app to be removed from app stores for seven days for rectification.

As the boundaries of censorship expanded, many terms unrelated to politics were banned due to homophones or visual similarities. In December 2019, a Zhihu user asked "How to wash a narrow-neck bottle" (Chinese: 细颈瓶; pinyin: xìjìngpíng). Because the term sounds similar to "Xi Jinping" (Chinese: 习近平; pinyin: Xí Jìnpíng), the question was deleted for "violating relevant internet laws and regulations", a phenomenon mocked by netizens as a modern version of "Soviet jokes". During the COVID-19 pandemic in 2020, dissatisfied with the authorities' handling of the situation, netizens deconstructed the Chinese character "Cui" (Chinese: 翠) into "Xi-Xi-Die" (Chinese: 习习卒)—where "Zu" (卒) means "to die"—implied "Praying for Cui" (Chinese: 祈翠) meant "Praying for Xi to die". Netizens also used the deconstruction as a pun on the phrase "Chairman Xi" (Chinese: 习主席; pinyin: Xí zhǔxí), replacing "主席" with the similar sounding "卒习" (pinyin: zúxí), meaning "Die, Xi", resulting in netizens saying "Die, Xi, die!" (Chinese: 习卒习). This led to the temporary appearance and subsequent banning of a "Daily Pray for Cui" Super topic on Weibo, and the character became restricted on some platforms.

== Censorship and suppression ==
=== Domestic persecution ===
On February 10, 2022, midnight, five National Security Department police officers forcibly entered Jeffrey Leung's home, arrested him, and interrogated him about his YouTube account and the Ruters Association, an association of anti-CCP creators in which Jeffrey Leung had participated. The police accused Jeffrey Leung of sedition, demanded him to sign a confession with screenshots of his channel, and confiscated his computer, mobile phone, and other personal belongings. The national security police continued to harass Jeffrey Leung, and pressured him to act as an informant and provide information about other members of the Ruters Association. Under stress and unease from the arrest, interrogation, and harassment, Jeffrey Leung fled Hong Kong to the U.S. in 2022.

Another prominent Rubao blogger Frog Haha of the Wall Nation revealed to Voice of America in 2022 that members of their Telegram group had been summoned by the Chinese police to trace and identify him.

=== Oveseas censorship and copyright claims ===
Since 2021, the Rubao culture has gradually formed a specialized circle of content creators, including professional spoof accounts such as "Ruters Association" (乳透社) and "Frog Haha of the Wall Nation" (墙国蛙蛤蛤). These creators mostly publish on overseas platforms like YouTube, but still face interference from Chinese official forces. During the Lunar New Year in February 2021, the YouTube channel "Ruters Association" hosted a "Rubao Lunar New Year Gala". Subsequently, its affiliated channels "Ruters Association: Little Anti-Flag" and "Ruters Association: Little Pond" were hit with a massive number of malicious copyright claims from mainland China (using content from platforms like Bilibili to file claims), resulting in the temporary suspension of channels or removal of videos.

On October 5, 2023, the YouTube channel "Voice of Chonglang" was permanently banned by the platform for "cyberbullying and harassment". The channel had published multiple videos satirizing Xi Jinping and had played anti-CCP audio clips in live lobbies of the game Goose Goose Duck. According to Radio Free Asia, the ban may have been related to tracking parameters contained in Bilibili links shared by the channel on Twitter (now X), which exposed the operator's personal information and allowed Chinese authorities to identify them; the operator subsequently lost contact with the outside world.

== International impact ==
In the United States, Winnie the Pooh has become a well-known meme as a stand-in for Xi Jinping. The animated series South Park directly depicted Winnie the Pooh imprisoned in a cage in its 2019 episode "Band in China", satirizing China's censorship system, which led to the show being completely banned in China. World-renowned YouTuber PewDiePie was also banned in China in October 2019 after discussing memes comparing Xi to Winnie the Pooh in a video, stating "China is now ruled by someone who looks like Winnie the Pooh." Additionally, talk show host John Oliver devoted a segment to Xi Jinping on Last Week Tonight with John Oliver, extensively using the Winnie the Pooh image for satire and harshly criticizing China's censorship, further promoting the meme in the English-speaking world.

In Japan, netizens often use "Pooh" (Japanese: プーさん) or "Kinpe" (Japanese: キンペー, a variation of the Japanese reading for Jinping) to refer to Xi Jinping. Japanese online communities also circulate derivative works satirizing China's authoritarianism, such as spoof images combining Xi with anime characters. During the 2019 Hong Kong Anti-ELAB movement and the 2022 White Paper Protests, supporters in Tokyo and other places frequently wore Winnie the Pooh costumes or held signs satirizing Xi Jinping to express protest against the Chinese government, with related footage being broadcast by international news agencies.

In Taiwan, netizens and commentators frequently use the term "General Accelerator" (Chinese: 总加速师; pinyin: Zǒng jiāsù shī) to refer to Xi Jinping, implying that his hardline policies and centralization of power are accelerating the decline of the CCP regime, the economic downturn, or the international containment of China. This term was later re-imported into the mainland Chinese internet as another obscure form of mockery. Furthermore, Taiwanese media often use Rubao-related meme images as illustrations or commentary material when reporting on Chinese political news, and outlets like the Central News Agency have published special reports on how Chinese netizens evade censorship to use the term.

== Evaluation and significance ==
Evaluations of Rubao culture often focus on its symbolic significance as "resistance of the weak" and its deconstructive role in political communication.

=== Academic perspectives ===
China scholars such as Perry Link, a Distinguished Professor at the University of California, Riverside, point out that using satire against leaders to oppose totalitarianism is a long-standing tradition among the Chinese people. In the Xi Jinping era, as formal channels for dissent have been blocked, this satire has transformed into internet memes, becoming a tool for "de-sanctification" aimed at peeling away the perfect image the ruler attempts to establish. Political scientist James C. Scott's theory of "Weapons of the Weak" is often used to explain such phenomena: when open collective action is impossible, the ruled maintain dignity and express refusal to comply through covert satire and spoofs. Scholars have also cited Mikhail Bakhtin's "Carnivalesque" theory, suggesting that Rubao culture constructs a virtual square that subverts the official hierarchical order, allowing participants to temporarily achieve liberation and equality through laughter. This online carnival serves as a psychological compensation and rebellion against the high-pressure politics of reality.

=== Media and commentary ===
Media outlets such as Radio Free Asia and Voice of America have analyzed that the vitality of Rubao culture lies in its interactivity and creativity; unlike traditional pro-democracy slogans, it is closer to the context of "digital natives". It is not merely simple emotional venting but constitutes political enlightenment and identity formation for a younger generation of netizens. The New York Times has linked this subculture to the "Lying Flat" movement among Chinese youth, viewing both as passive resistance to a high-pressure social environment. However, the media also notes that participating in such subcultural activities carries extremely high risks, having led to the arrest or harassment of multiple individuals both inside and outside China, reflecting the Chinese government's logic of viewing any form of image damage as a threat to national security.

=== Official reaction ===
Although the government of the People's Republic of China rarely publicly mentions the specific term "Rubao", its actions indicate that it regards such culture as subversion of state power and a danger to national security. Official media have repeatedly criticized "historical nihilism" and the trend of spoofing heroes on the internet, cracking down severely through legal tools such as the Law of the People's Republic of China on the Protection of Heroes and Martyrs. Although Xi Jinping himself is not a "martyr" by legal definition, spoofs targeting national leaders are usually categorized as "harmful information" or "insulting Party and State leaders" for cleanup purposes. The Cyberspace Administration of China (CAC) has launched multiple special campaigns, such as the "Qinglang" (Clear and Bright) series, listing such content as key targets for suppression and requiring platforms to comprehensively clear political "harmful" information.

== See also ==
- Censorship of Winnie the Pooh in China
- Personality cult of Xi Jinping
- Toad worship
- White Paper Protests
