= Jeffrey Leung =

Hong Kong human rights activist in exile the U.S.

- Born: Hong Kong
- Education: King's College, Hong Kong; University of California, Berkeley

Jeffrey Leung (Yue Chinese: 梁啟駿, romanized: Leung Kai-chun, Mandarin Chinese romanized: Liang Qijun), known as Fragile Bard (易碎君, lit. 'Mr. Fragile') online, is a Hong Kong human rights activist in exile in the United States. Leung was arrested, searched, and detained at age 15 by the Hong Kong National Security Department for crticizing and satirizing Chinese politics, especially Xi Jinping, on social media. Leung went into self-exile at age 16, and sought political asylum in the United States. In 2025, Leung submitted a petition to the International Criminal Court to investigate British national judges in Hong Kong for their roles in Hong Kong government's crimes against humanity and persecution of thousands of civilians and journalists.While attending University of California, Berkeley, Leung joined the Berkeley Human Rights Center as a student researcher.

Interviews of Leung discussing his experience being persecuted in Hong Kong have gained over 2 million views on YouTube.

== Early life and exile ==
Entering high school in September 2021, Jeffrey Leung became opposed to the controversial "Citizenship and Social Development" course, a required class in Hong Kong high schools, and a class that is criticized for brainwashing students into following the agenda of the government of Hong Kong. The course motivated him to criticize and satirize Xi Jinping..

On February 10, 2022, five National Security Department police officers came to Jeffrey Leung's home with a search warrant issued by the West Kowloon Magistrates' Courts, arrested and took him to the police station, and interrogated him about his YouTube account and the Ruters Association, an association of anti-CCP creators in which Jeffrey Leung was a member. The police accused Jeffrey Leung of incitement, demanded him to sign a confession with screenshots of his channel, and confiscated his computer, mobile phone, and other personal belongings. Since then, the national security police continually harassed Jeffrey Leung, and pressured him to provide information about other members of the Ruters Association. Under stress and fear from the arrest, detention, interrogation, and harassment, Jeffrey Leung completed 10th grade at King's College.

In August 2022, Jeffrey Leung decided to leave Hong Kong. With the help of his elder brother, he flew to San Francisco alone as an unaccompanied minor, and sought political asylum. Upon arriving in the United States, Jeffrey Leung was detained at an immigration facility for over three months, and lived with two foster families. Having been released from detention, Jeffrey Leung attended a public high school. Meanwhile, his family left Hong Kong and relocated to the United Kingdom. Jeffrey Leung believed that free speech under the Hong Kong National Security Law was being suppressed. He also said in an interview that many young people opposing the government had chosen to leave Hong Kong because of the political situation.

== Political activism ==
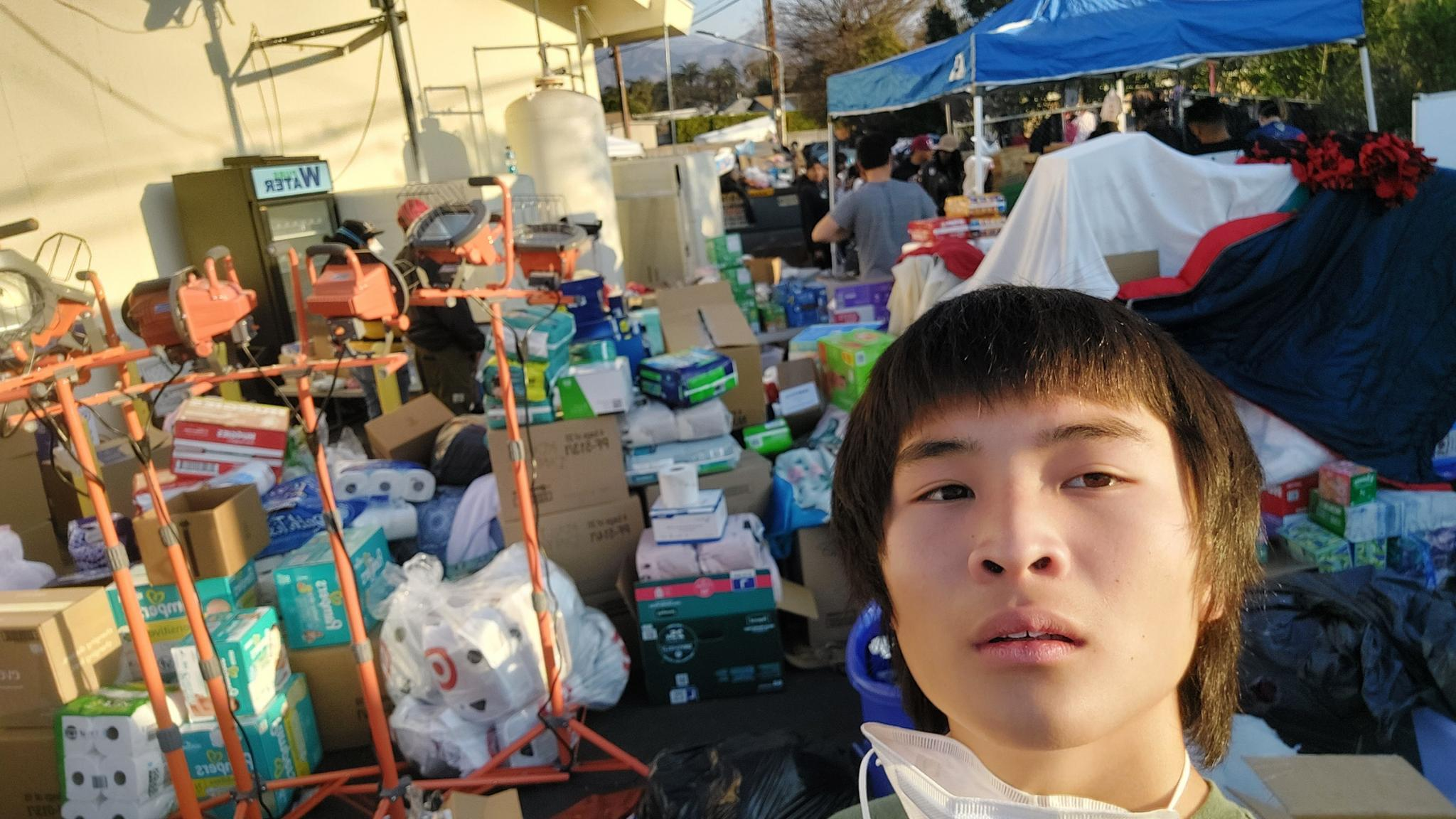
Leung participating in disaster relief for victims of the 2025 Los Angeles wildfires

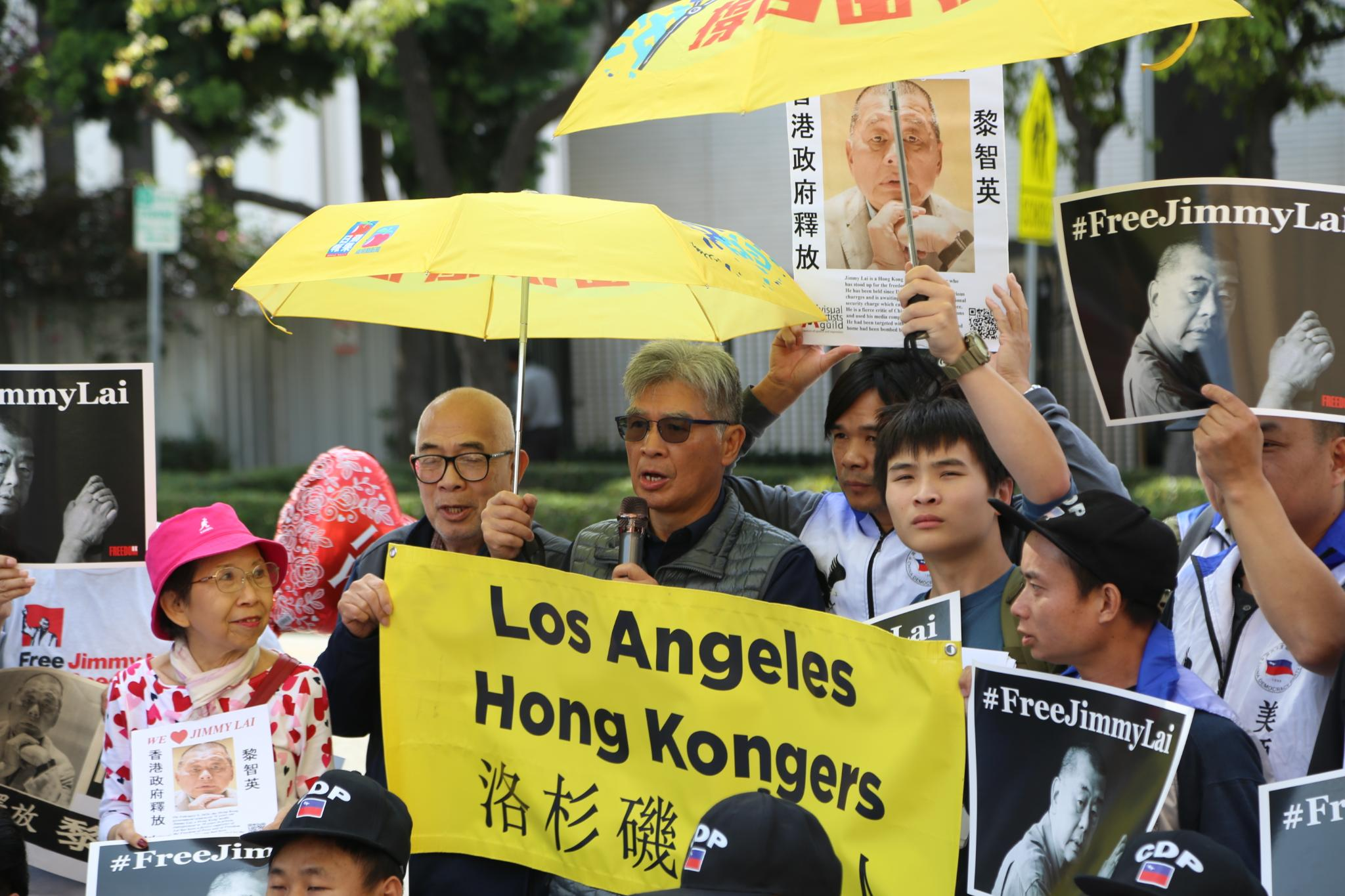
February 2026, Jeffrey Leung with former Hong Kong legislator Sin Chung-kai and journalist Ching Cheong at a rally outside the Chinese Consulate in Los Angeles protesting the unfair trial and imprisonment of Jimmy Lai

=== Aid to individuals under persecution ===
Since 2024, Jeffrey Leung has coordinated legal and social aid to Hong Kong and Chinese dissidents facing political persecution, and helped Yuen-Hong Tam and others seek political asylum in Canada or the U.S. Yuen-Hong Tam was an editor for the Great Translation Movement, which received coverage by mainstream media such as BBC and CNN. Following the enaction of the Hong Kong National Security Law, Tam feared political persecution, and fled to the United States on March 29, 2024. Tam was detained at San Francisco International Airport, and held in an immigration detention facility in Los Angeles with bail set at $12,500.

=== Hong Kong Parliament ===
In May 2025, Jeffrey Leung was elected as a member of the first Hong Kong Parliament, an exiled organization, but did not choose to take the oath of office, resulting in his seat being vacant.

=== International Criminal Court petition ===
On August 1, 2025, Jeffrey Leung formally filed a petition with the International Criminal Court (ICC), accusing 12 high-ranking judges in Hong Kong who hold British nationality of crimes against humanity for their roles in the Hong Kong government's political persecution of thousands of civilians and journalists. The petition leverages the ICC’s personal jurisdiction over British and British overseas nationals. By targeting the dual status of these officials, the petition aims to shatter the "just following orders" defense, and establish international legal accountability for those facilitating authoritarian repression while enjoying the protections of citizenship in a free democratic nation.

== See also ==
- 2020 Hong Kong national security law
- Joshua Wong
- Rubao culture
