= Hong Kong Parliament (exiled organisation) =

Pro-democracy organisation

- 香港議會
- Formation: July 2025
- Headquarters: Toronto, Canada
- Key people: Elmer Yuen; Victor Ho
- Website: hkparliament.org

The Hong Kong Parliament (Chinese: 香港議會) is an organisation formed by pro-democracy Hongkongers, located in Toronto, Canada. Following the first election conducted online across the world in May 2025, it was officially inaugurated in July 2025.

Hong Kong Parliament's predecessor is the Hong Kong Parliament Electoral Organizing Committee (香港議會選舉籌備委員會). Formed on 27 July 2022, it was led by Canadian journalist Victor Ho and businessman Elmer Yuen in Toronto, Canada. The Hong Kong Parliament Election Commission's goal was organising the first election in May 2025 for Hong Kong people and overseas Hongkongers as well, to express their opinions fairly and democratically.

== Background ==
On 3 August 2022, the Hong Kong Security Bureau condemned their activism and stated that arrest warrants for Baggio Leung, Elmer Yuen, and Victor Ho had been issued by the Hong Kong Security Bureau. The three were suspected of violating the Hong Kong national security law, specifically to have committed "subversion of state power". Bounty was placed on Ho in December 2024.

On 8 August 2022, Elmer Yuen told Radio Free Asia that Chinese state security police has threatened him to stop his work.

On 8 July 2023, PBS anchor John Yang interviewed Yuen. The interview revealed that the activist is one of eight Hongkongers in exile for whom Hong Kong police has issued arrest warrants. Yuen called their actions a violation of the Chinese Constitution and Hong Kong Basic Law, and said that they are trying to scare him with tactics including detaining his children still living in Hong Kong.

On 24 November 2025, the organisation is banned by Security Bureau under Sec. 60 (1) of the Safeguarding National Security Ordinance.

== 2025 election ==
2025 Hong Kong Parliament election
- 5 May 2025 – 30 May 2025
- 15 seats for election
Party	Leader	Seats
HKDIA	Alan Keung	6
HKNP		1
This lists parties that won seats. See the complete results below.

The first election to the Hong Kong Parliament was held virtually between 5 and 30 May 2025. Voting was initially scheduled to begin on 30 March, but was delayed after the nomination period, which started on 4 February, was extended for a month to last until 15 April, likely to allow for more promotion. The organizing committee set the maximum number of seats for the parliament at 35. If there are less than 35 candidates, the number of seats will be four-fifths of the number of candidates to retain competition.

Voters must have reached the age of sixteen and be born within Hong Kong or resided there for over seven years, or the offspring of such. Voters will need to present passport or other identification document to verify when using the online system to vote on mobile phone. This has raised safety concerns of voters as the Hong Kong government has deemed Hong Kong Parliament "subversive".

=== Campaign ===
Eight exiled activists announced forming Hong Kong Democratic Independence Alliance in November 2024 and said they will file for candidacy. The new party said they will advocate Hong Kong democratization. However, party leader Alan Keung was later asked to leave Taiwan by the Taiwanese authorities after his application of stay was rejected. Sources quoted by Voice of America said this was unrelated to the upcoming election.

=== Result ===
15 of 20 candidates were confirmed to be elected as members of the Hong Kong Parliament on 30 June 2025.

No.	Candidate	Political group	Based in	Votes	Result	Note
3	Alan Keung Ka-wai (姜嘉偉)	HKDIA	Canada	1,171	Confirmed	
4	Lin Bin (林斌)	Independent	Australia	1,093	Confirmed	
13	Colin Ho Wing-yau (何永友)	Independent	United Kingdom	1,049	Confirmed	
18	Agnes Ng (吳文君)	HKDIA	Taiwan	1,005	Confirmed	
2	Chin Po-fun (錢寶芬)	Independent	United Kingdom	969	Confirmed	(Note: Chin was a member of People Power when in Hong Kong.)
6	Cheung Shun-yin (張信燕)	Independent	Thailand	933	Confirmed	
5	Wong Chun-wah (黃振華)	HKDIA	Taiwan	895	Confirmed	
19	Lap Fong Lap-yin (方立然)	Independent	United States	890	Confirmed	
1	Jeffrey Leung Kai-chun (梁啟駿)	Independent	United States	877	Confirmed	
14	Chu Ka-kei (朱嘉祺)	Independent	Taiwan	870	Confirmed	(Note: Former member of Hong Kong Democratic Independence Alliance (Withdrawn statement of HKDIA members).)
9	Au Wing-hon (歐永康)	Independent	Taiwan	866	Confirmed	
15	Hau Chung-yu (侯中宇)	Independent	Taiwan	804	Confirmed	
8	Paul Ha (夏海俊)	ASPDMC	Taiwan	792	Confirmed	(Note: Hong Kong Alliance in Support of Patriotic Democratic Movements of China was dissolved in Hong Kong in September 2021.)
7	Tony Lam (林千淦)	HKDIA	Canada	734	Confirmed	
17	Wong Sau-wo (黃修和)	HKNP	Australia	692	Confirmed	(Note: Hong Kong National Party was banned in Hong Kong in September 2018.)
11	Chan Tin-yau (陳天佑)	Independent	New Zealand	650	Failed	
16	William Ho Man-cheong (何文昌)	Independent	Australia	676	Failed	
12	Shadow Shi Lok-yin (施樂賢)	Independent	Taiwan	–	Withdrawn	
20	Steven Tsang Wai-fan (曾偉藩)	Independent	United Kingdom	–	Withdrawn	
10	Sam Shum Wai-keung (岑偉強)	Independent	United Kingdom	747	Disqualified	

Source: https://hkparliament.org/

== Arrest warrants ==
On 26 July 2025, the National Security Department put 19 individuals, who were organisers or participants of the Hong Kong Parliament election, in a wanted list, with the police declaring the organisation as "subversive". On 4 August 2025, 16 of the 19 individuals were issued arrest warrants by the Secretary for Security under the Safeguarding National Security Ordinance.

=== Organisers ===
Name	Bounty	Notes
Elmer Yuen	HK$1 million	Wanted for collusion with foreign country or with external elements to endangernational security; Involved in the Hong Kong Parliament Electoral Organizing Committee
Victor Ho Leung-mau	HK$1 million	Involved in the Hong Kong Parliament Electoral Organizing Committee
Fok Ka-chi	HK$1 million	Wanted for incitement to secession and incitement to subversion; Involved in the Hong Kong Parliament Electoral Organizing Committee
Choi Ming-da	HK$1 million	Wanted for incitement to secession and incitement to subversion; Involved in the Hong Kong Parliament Electoral Organizing Committee
Chan Lai-chun	HK$200,000	Involved in the Hong Kong Parliament Electoral Organizing Committee
Feng Chongyi	HK$200,000	Involved in the Hong Kong Parliament Electoral Organizing Committee
Gong Sasha	HK$200,000	Involved in the Hong Kong Parliament Electoral Organizing Committee
Ng Man-yan	HK$200,000	Involved in the Hong Kong Parliament Electoral Organizing Committee
Tsang Wai-fan	HK$200,000	Involved in the Hong Kong Parliament Electoral Organizing Committee

=== Participants ===
Name	Bounty	Notes
Chin Po-fun	HK$200,000	Participated in the election and sworn-in as the member of the organisation
Ha Hoi-chun Paul	HK$200,000	Participated in the election and sworn-in as the member of the organisation
Hau Chung-yu	HK$200,000	Participated in the election and sworn-in as the member of the organisation
Ho Wing-yau	HK$200,000	Participated in the election and sworn-in as the member of the organisation
Keung Ka-wai	HK$200,000	Participated in the election and sworn-in as the member of the organisation
Lam Tony	HK$200,000	Participated in the election and sworn-in as the member of the organisation
Ng Agnes	HK$200,000	Participated in the election and sworn-in as the member of the organisation
Wong Chun-wah	HK$200,000	Participated in the election and sworn-in as the member of the organisation
Wong Sau-wo	HK$200,000	Participated in the election and sworn-in as the member of the organisation
Zhang Xinyan	HK$200,000	Participated in the election and sworn-in as the member of the organisation

Source: List of wanted persons (26 July 2025)
