= Five Demands, Not One Less =

Hong Kong political slogan and protest goals

- Part of 2019–2020 Hong Kong protests
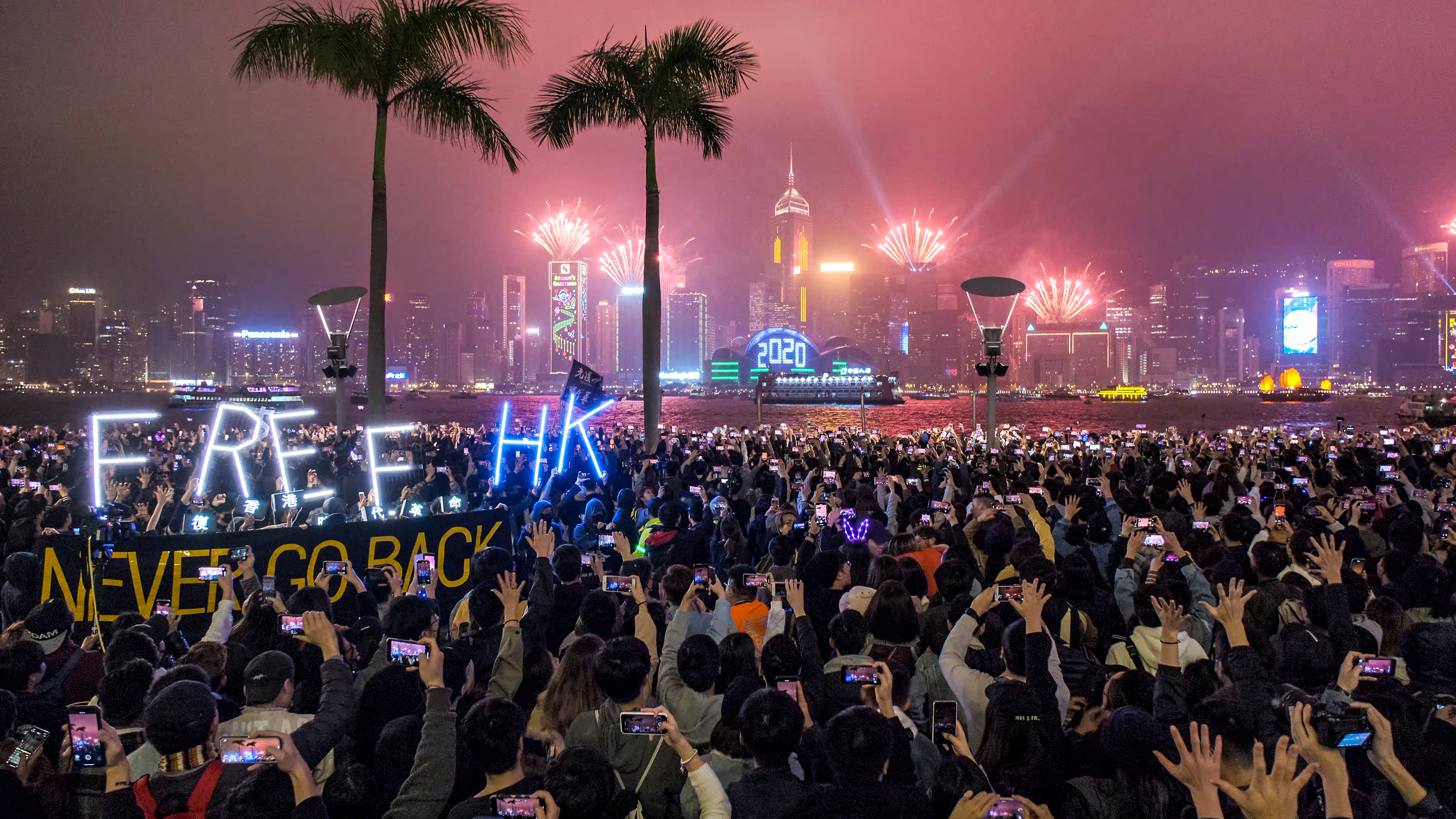
- Hong Kong citizens raising the "five demands" hand gesture during a 2019 New Year's Eve countdown event
- Date: from mid-June, 2019
- Location: Hong Kong
- Cause: Five key demands raised by citizens during the anti-extradition bill protests
- Motive: Government of Hong Kong; Central Government of China
- Organized by: Anti-extradition bill citizens and political groups
- Outcome: Only one of the five demands achieved (withdrawal of the extradition bill)

Five Demands, Not One Less (Chinese: 五大訴求，缺一不可; Jyutping: ng5daai6 sou3kau4, kyut3 jat1 bat1ho2; abbreviated FDNOL.) is a political slogan and set of protest goals that emerged during the Hong Kong anti-extradition bill protests.

== History ==
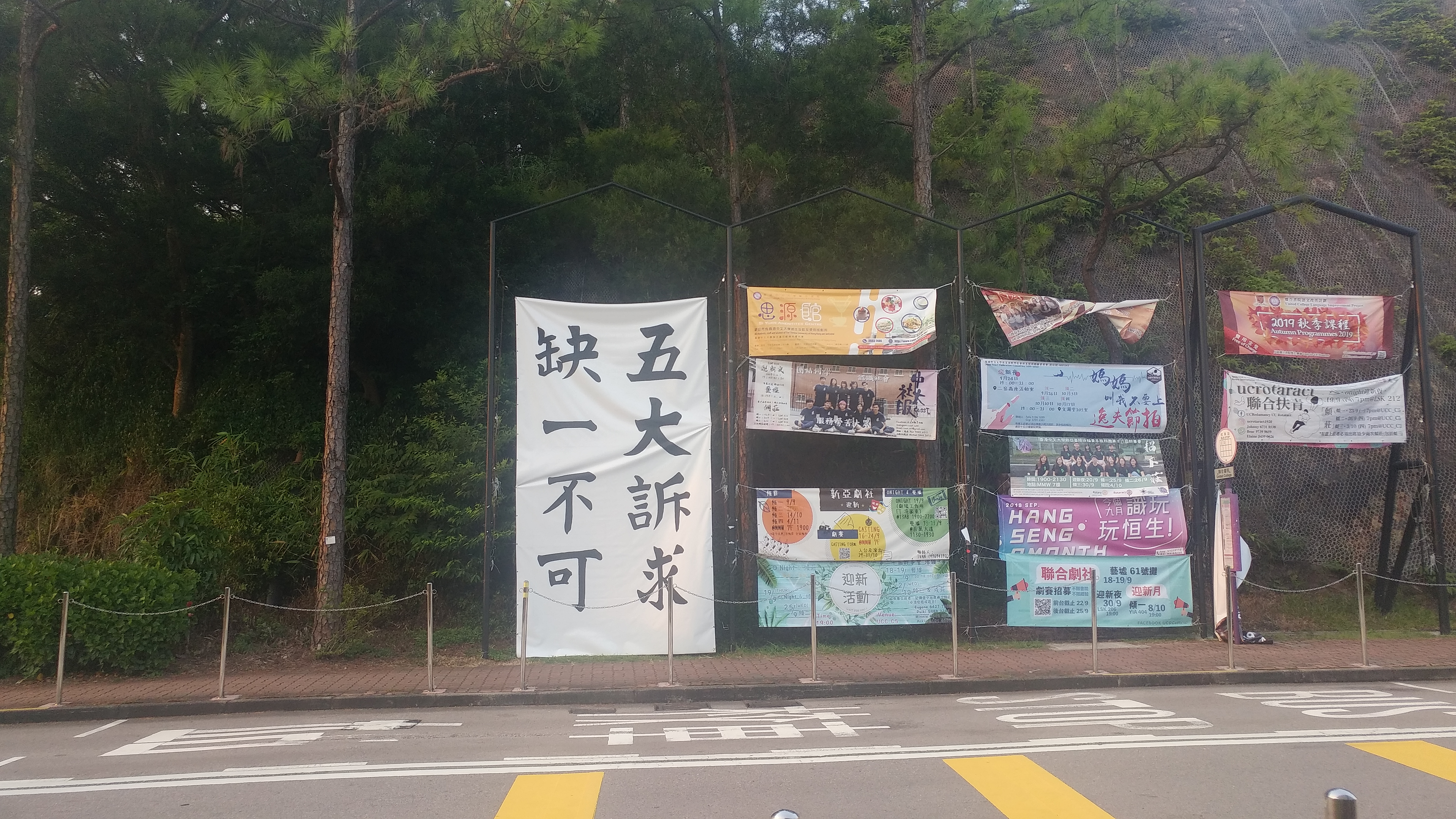
A banner displaying "Five Demands, Not One Less" at United College, Chinese University of Hong Kong.

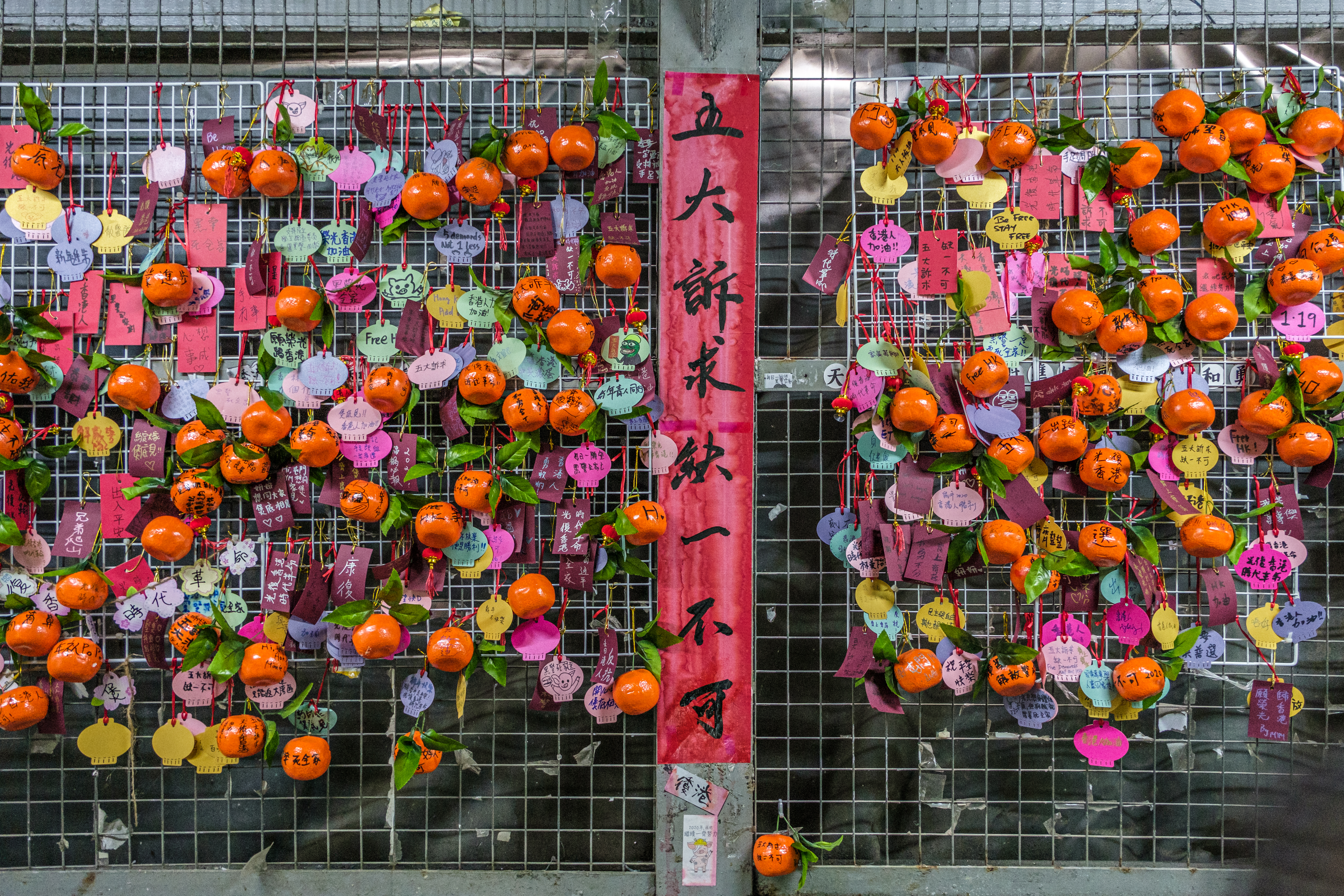
A Lennon Wall in Hong Kong featuring a chunlian with the slogan "Five Demands, Not One Less".

Initially, the primary target of the protesters' demonstrations was the extradition bill, with "anti-extradition" as the main slogan. Subsequently, the Civil Human Rights Front and protesters articulated five key demands: (1) complete withdrawal of the extradition bill, (2) retraction of the "riot" designation for protests, (3) release and dropping of charges against arrested protesters, (4) establishment of an independent Commission of Inquiry to investigate allegations of police brutality, and (5) resignation of Chief Executive Carrie Lam. Following the occupation of the Legislative Council, protesters modified the demand for Carrie Lam's resignation to achieving "dual universal suffrage," meaning both the Legislative Election and the Chief Executive Election should be conducted through free and direct election, marking a turning point in the movement. Subsequently, protesters expanded the protests into a broader movement expressing a range of political and social grievances, with the focus shifting to concerns about police brutality.

On August 27, 2019, Chief Executive Carrie Lam addressed the media before an Executive Council meeting, reiterating her refusal to concede to the five demands.

== Five-One Hand Gesture ==
The "Five-One" hand gesture, used to express "Five Demands, Not One Less," typically involves raising the right hand with all five fingers extended and the left hand with the index finger pointing upward, forming the characters for "five" and "one."

== Demands ==
=== Main five demands ===
- Complete withdrawal of the extradition bill (achieved).
- Retraction of the "riot" designation for protests (initially referencing June 12 incident).
- Dropping all charges against anti-extradition protesters.
- Establishment of an independent Commission of Inquiry to thoroughly investigate police brutality.
- Immediate implementation of "true dual universal suffrage."

=== Other proposed demands ===
- Resignation of Chief Executive Carrie Lam.
- Reorganization or disbandment of the police force (previously proposed as one of the five demands)
- Withdrawal of Article 23 legislation.
- Withdrawal of the Hong Kong National Security Law.

The pan-democrats have stated that pro-Beijing forces deliberately distort the five demands, emphasizing that they do not explicitly include independence.

== Related incidents ==
- On August 27, 2019, the Xiaomi Group's brand Redmi television account, @Redmi TV, posted on Sina Weibo to promote its upcoming TV launch on August 29. One post used the slogan "Five Major Platforms, Not One Less" to highlight support for five video platforms. Due to its striking similarity to the Hong Kong protest slogan "Five Demands, Not One Less," it was criticized by China's Global Times as "brainless." Following the criticism, Redmi TV changed the slogan to "Abundant Content."
- On September 9, 2020, episode 993 of the TVB drama Come Home Love: Lo and Behold aired. Netizens noticed a scene in an office cleaning setting where a pair of yellow gloves was placed on a computer monitor, with one glove showing five fingers extended and the other showing the middle finger, resembling the anti-extradition protest's "Five-One" gesture. The yellow color also symbolized the protest movement. The social media page "Hong Kong News" reported that the yellow gloves' "Five-One" gesture appeared for 14 seconds, prompting complaints to the government. Chip Tsao mocked netizens on Facebook, noting the scene had "many details," "richer than the Da Vinci Code," and "no wonder they got angry." By the evening of September 10, the episode on MyTV SUPER was replaced with a distant shot due to complaints from "external audiences via the External Affairs Department." On September 16, media outlets such as Hong Kong 01 and Wen Wei Po reported that the director responsible for filming the episode was sacked by TVB.

== See also ==
- 2019 Hong Kong extradition bill
- 2019–2020 Hong Kong protests
- Liberate Hong Kong, revolution of our times
- Universal suffrage in Hong Kong
- Universal suffrage
- Umbrella Movement
- Three-finger salute
- 17+8 Demands — Protest goals set by pro-democracy activists in Indonesia
