= Police misconduct allegations during the 2019–2020 Hong Kong protests =

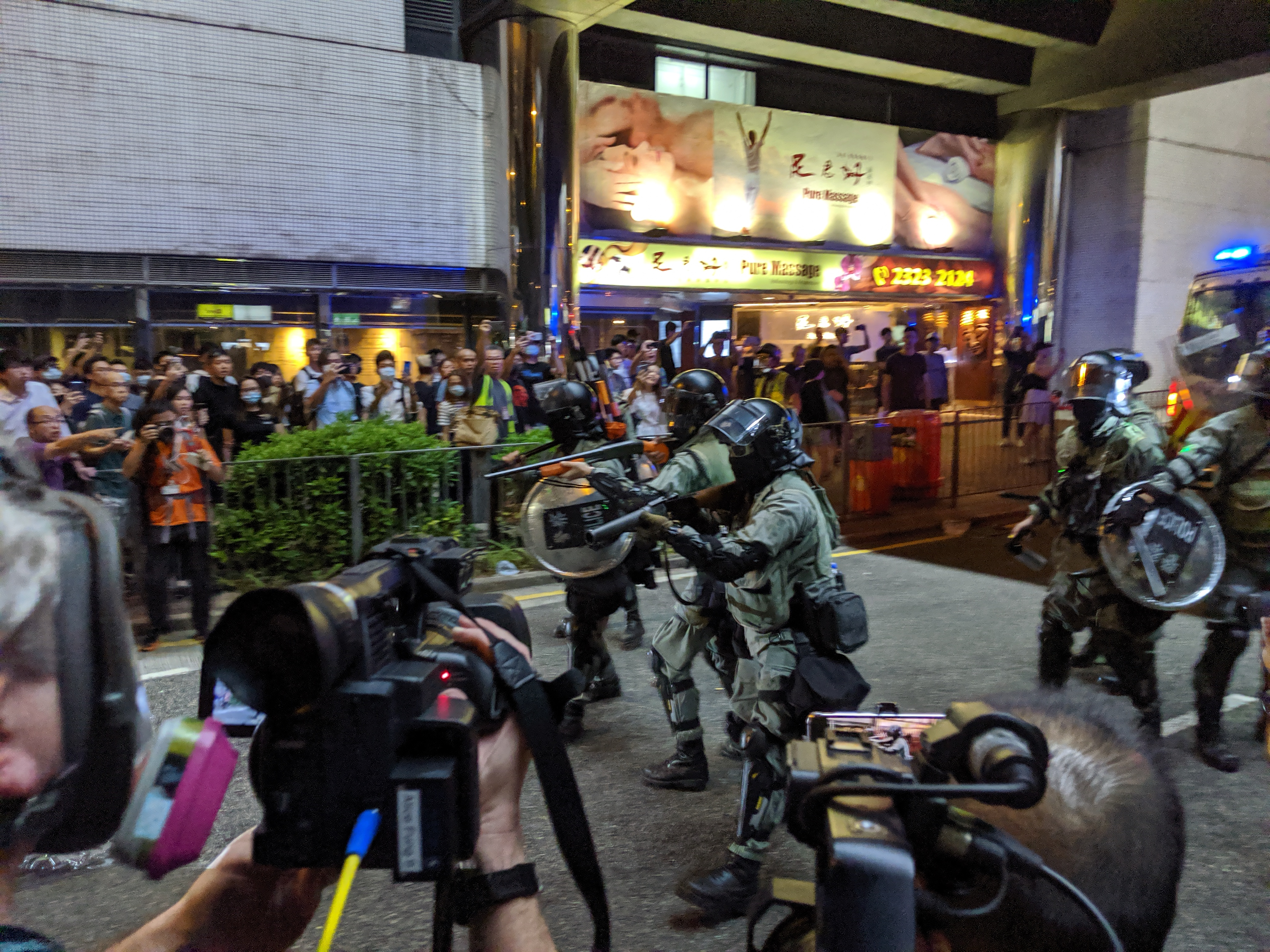
Hong Kong riot police point their guns towards a crowd of journalists during the demonstration on 3 October 2019.

The conduct of the Hong Kong Police Force is a subject of controversy during the 2019–2020 Hong Kong protests. Tactics employed by the force have led to misconduct allegations and protesters have accused the Hong Kong government of using the police as a method to resolve a "lingering political crisis." Actions taken by the police force and the Hong Kong government have caused mixed reactions inside Hong Kong and in the general international community. Allegations against the police include excessive use of force, force against unspecific targets, and arrest without warrant. These allegations have been presented in various media both supporting and detracting from the complaints, such as through amateur video. In general, the spirit, rumors, videos, and other media shared by the public have caused a drop in support for the police force, and an Amnesty International report accused the police of using excessive force against civilians. One of the objectives of the 2019–2020 protests is establishment of an independent inquiry system into said allegations.

Although the Independent Police Complaints Council (IPCC) – a body accused of lacking independence and being impotent – has launched investigations into alleged police misconduct in relation to the protests, some members of the public remain dissatisfied with the escalation of police violence. Protesters contend said violence is often disproportionate and have called for an independent commission of inquiry to be established. Many observers have demanded the Hong Kong government conduct a "prompt, independent, impartial investigation" on police use of force against protesters, but police unions often raise complaints about this, citing statute and stating that the IPCC is enough. Joining Hong Kong police unions in this matter is Hong Kong's chief executive, Carrie Lam, who has steadfastly resisted these calls, citing "very, very, very limited" room for manoeuvre. In September 2019, Lam established a panel of foreign experts to work with the IPCC to report on its findings, but several members resigned in November 2019, citing inadequate powers given to the body.

The IPCC published the Thematic Study by the IPCC on the Public Order Events arising from the Fugitive Offenders Bill on 2020-05-16. The report issued 52 recommendations, which target the police's operations and observations in some major incidents, including the 2019-07-21 Yuen Long incident and the 2019-06-12 police operations. According to the newsletter made by IPCC in March 2021, among the 52 recommendations, 10 of them have been completed, 4 with significant progress and 38 in progress.

More protesters have called for the force to be disbanded, citing the increasing rates of violence.

== Background ==
Once heralded as "Asia's Finest", the public approval rating of the Hong Kong Police Force fell drastically during 2019. Between 1997 and 2010, the police enjoyed net positive approval from the mid-50 to mid-70 percent levels. It reached an all-time low as a result of its actions during the Umbrella Revolution, a similar movement that took place in 2014.

According to Hong Kong historian Jason Wordie, since the handover of Hong Kong to the People's Republic of China, loyalty and political reliability at all levels of the governing apparatus have been valued greatly by the Chinese government. In the case of the HKPF, the regime explicitly prioritises ethical "flexibility" and loyalty to directives, as well as obedience to orders.

Alleged police brutality has played a significant role in fuelling public anger and driving the protests; the position of both sides became more entrenched as the protests progressed. Hongkongers' initial shock at the usage of tear gas by the police and their use of batons contributed to 2 million people rallying on 16 June. Since then, water cannons laced with blue dye and other skin irritants, projectiles such as beanbags, rubber and sponge-tipped bullets, pepper spray; baton charges and mass arrests, common riot control tactics, have seen increased use. In the six months since the protests began, police have fired 16,000 rounds of tear gas, 10,000 rubber bullets, and some 2,000 rounds of bean bags and 2,000 rounds of sponge bullets. Suspected triads have also attacked demonstrators, with allegedly little or no apparent reaction from the police force, which fuelled a rumor of criminal collusion. Armed with rudimentary protection and facing-off against well-armed police, protesters have thrown rocks, bricks, and Molotov cocktails; used poles, street barricades and slingshots for fighting; vandalised businesses symbolising oppression from the authoritarian PRC regime; and targeted metro stations because of its operator's complicity with police in restricting people's freedom to protest.

By the end of 2019, more than 6,000 protesters had been arrested and approximately 2,600 people had been treated at public hospital emergency wards. After a brief suspension, police reinstated an officer who on 11 November had driven his motorcycle into a crowd of protesters. There have been numerous other cases of alleged police brutality, and dissidents accuse the force of not disciplining their officers appropriately. A senior part-time officer was suspended from duty over allegedly leaking operational plans for New Year's Eve to a Telegram group.

== Accountability ==
=== Leadership and supervision ===
Complaints against the police are handled within the police force by the Complaints Against Police Office (CAPO), whose work is monitored by the Independent Police Complaints Council (IPCC) – a government-appointed entity staffed by laypersons independent of the police. The body lacks credibility with some members of the public as its appointees are predominantly pro-establishment, and a significant number among them are allied with CY Leung, the previous chief executive officer. The council has no power to subpoena documents or witnesses, make definitive judgements and hand out penalties. A panel of international experts was hired to assist the IPCC investigate the 2019 protests, and it proposed giving it more power to launch a full investigation into officers' conduct. When this request was denied, many members of the panel resigned.

Security consultant and former police officer, Martin Purbrick, said that the police organisation is beset with organisational and management problems. Its rigid structure and culture "does not lend itself to creative ideas from junior management in times when existing rules are not working". Management has demonstrably been unable or unwilling to control rogue elements in the force. The police have often defended their actions with provocative explanations, and an analysis in Quartz suggested that police responses to criticism reflect their confidence that they will not be investigated. Head of HKPORI, Dr Robert Chung, said that the police had completely deviated from the good practices set up in 1994 under the Service Quality Wing. He suggested trust could be restored by greater discipline of police officers, whose lack of self-control had led to an escalation of civil violence; he also believed all uniformed officers should clearly display their identification on the field and refrain from infiltrating demonstrators.

The case of Indonesian journalist Veby Indah highlights the difficulty for victims of police violence in holding police accountable. Indah, while covering a protest for the Indonesian-language newspaper Suara, lost sight in one eye after being hit by a projectile allegedly fired by a police officer on 29 September 2019 as she was filming. Her request to the Hong Kong Police Force for the identity of the officer responsible remained outstanding at the end of December. Since the protests against the ill-fated bill began, Hong Kong authorities have relied on the city's police to maintain order in the face of mounting protests. Not only has the government invoked sweeping colonial-era laws to ban the wearing of masks, it has eased operating restraints of the police: A leaked document showed the government loosened guidelines on the use of lethal force one day before a student was shot: "officers will be accountable for their own actions" was deleted from guidelines. The lack of restraint exercised by the police, to the extent that being captured on film is no longer a deterrent to misconduct, has undermined its standing and legitimacy in society.

Although chief secretary Matthew Cheung apologised for the delayed police response to the violence in Yuen Long, saying the force's handling of the incident "[fell] short of people's expectations", he backtracked the next day after police unions reacted angrily. Cheung then proclaimed that the police had "fulfilled its duties in maintaining social order under enormous stress at this difficult time". Hong Kong Chief Executive Carrie Lam continued to support the police and refused outright to criticise their conduct, let alone set up an independent judicial inquiry. More than 30 leaders from across society, notably including former chief justice Andrew Li, have publicly called on the administration to launch an independent inquiry, but this is staunchly opposed by police unions. The newly promoted commissioner Chris Tang said that independent scrutiny would be an "injustice" and a "tool for inciting hatred" against the force. Government opposition to an independent inquiry has lent credence to the idea that it actively endorses police violence. No police have been held accountable for their excesses as at the end of December 2019. The inevitable conclusion many members of the public have drawn is that the police have total immunity. Police sources of Washington Post have said that a culture of impunity pervades the police force, such that riot police often disregard their training or became dishonest in official reports to justify excessive force. Commenting on police performance against guidelines one officer said that "commanders are too afraid to upset the front-line officers, so if their behavior is not too far away from the guidelines, then they'll just turn a blind eye [to excesses]". In response to the Post, the Police on 2019-12-25 stated that all officers are accountable for the force they use and their supervisors are present on site to oversee and ensure that the use of force is lawful.

=== Lack of identification ===
According to Police General Orders set by the commissioner of police, plain-clothes officers must show their warrant cards and explain their identities while exercising their police power and dealing with the public.

While uniformed officers must to show their warrant cards unless it would "affect the operations, harm the safety of the officers, or if the requests were unreasonable", members of the Special Tactical Squad (STS), known as "raptors" and officially as Special Tactical Contingent, apparently stopped displaying identification numbers during crowd control operations on 12 June 2019, while press photographs taken just two days earlier showed officers displaying them. In the Legislative Council, secretary of justice John Lee defended the change, saying that the uniform has "no room" to display the identification numbers. The pan-democrats criticised the lack of identification, saying that their absence would make officers unaccountable. The issue of law enforcers without visible identification has been a major source of complaints since the protests erupted. There was considerable public anger at on-duty police officers failing to display their numbers or warrant cards during a demonstration in early July 2019. It is contended that the lack of numbers is a tactic to avoid responsibility. As of October 2019 there were at least five judicial reviews against the police force about officers not displaying their identifying numbers on their uniform.

Since the invocation of the emergency law, officers began wearing face masks, making identification even more difficult. The police have defended officers' use of "protective gear". Vice-president of the IPCC, Christopher Cheung, claimed that members of the STS squad have the right to hide their identification number because they "have to enforce laws without having to worry about the consequences". He backtracked a day later, although he expressed fears that officers' identification numbers might be misused. By October, police said they had put in place a system of unique identifiers so that an officer could be identified even without his or her warrant number, but there is evidence of multiple officers using the same identifier during the same operation. There was considerable public anger at on-duty police officers failing to display their numbers or warrant cards during a demonstration in early July 2019. It is contended that the lack of numbers is a tactic to avoid responsibility.

== Use of force ==
Since 12 June 2019, police use of force has been frequently criticised. There is verifiable footage and witness statements by lawyers, first aiders, and others, all cataloguing the indiscriminate use of crowd control weapons and firearms against protesters and innocent bystanders alike, where individuals who get in the way of police receive a dose in their face. A database was compiled by the Washington Post of 65 incidents evenly spread between each month featuring police use of force between June and November, which took into account every crowd-control tool used by Hong Kong police, and police responses to both peaceful and violent protests. According to nine policing experts assembled by the newspaper to analyse the videos for adherence to the HKPF's guidelines and international standards, Hong Kong police had violated their own rules in about 70 percent of the incidents reviewed; the use of force could be justified under police guidelines in only five of the incidents. As demonstrators' use of bombs and bricks increased, public opinion polls showed that far more people blamed the government and police than protesters despite increasing violence by protesters.

Amnesty International published a report on 21 June 2019 that contained eight video clips, and concluded that the police's use of force had violated international human rights laws and standards. Subsequent reports by the NGO were based on interviews of protesters who alleged that the police had used excessive violence against them, including being punched and being hit using batons, even in instances with no active resistance. Of 21 people interviewed, 18 had been treated in hospital and three had been hospitalised for five days or more.

On the evening of 21 June, protesters besieged the police headquarters in Wan Chai for 15 hours to protest against police violence on 12 June.

The police were criticised by the organisation for using rubber bullets dangerously (by using it as a crowd dispersal weapon and injuring a protester's head on 12 June) During a confrontation with students from the City University of Hong Kong, the commander of the police force allegedly ordered police officers to shoot the student protesters in the head with rubber bullets. The police were also criticised for using pepper spray on a person who posed no obvious threat, and for the use of force on peaceful or retreating protesters. Usage of bean bag rounds allegedly ruptured a female protester's right eye on 11 August. The police denied shooting the protester in the head and suggested that evidence was inconclusive. However, on 29 September, the right eye of journalist Veby Mega Indah was permanently blinded after she was shot by a rubber bullet. Indah was standing away from the protesters with a group of journalists who identified themselves by wearing bright yellow vests and helmets with stickers and press cards on lanyards around their necks. Chief inspector John Tse regretted the injury, saying it was a pure accident. Tse argued that journalists and demonstrators were both at the scene, and demonstrators had thrown at least two petrol bombs from the bridge.

On 11 August the police fired pepper-ball rounds at protesters at point-blank range inside Tai Koo MTR station. The police claimed that its use of these weapons aligned with the manufacturer's safety guidelines, though in fact the safety warning pointed out that the weapon should not be used at close range.

Hong Kong police storm Prince Edward station and attack civilians on 31 August 2019

Some incidents of police violence have been described as showing disregard for public safety. When the police stormed into New Town Plaza and Yuen Long station on 14 and 28 July 2019, respectively, they trapped bystanders and commuters inside. Police officers were also accused of beating uninvolved bystanders with police batons. In the Tsuen Wan protest, a police officer kicked a man who was already kneeling before the officer. An elderly woman begging an officer not to use pepper spray to disperse the crowd was forcefully pushed away by the officer in question. The police responded by saying that the women had "obstructed" the police during the 1 December protest. When the STS squad stormed the Prince Edward station and assaulted the passengers and protesters inside with police batons and pepper spray on 31 August, it was once again accused of using excessive force against unarmed and non-resisting civilians. The police action was heavily condemned by the pan-democratic camp, whose convenor, Claudia Mo, called it a "licensed terror attack"; Amnesty International called the police operation that day a "rampage", and called for an investigation on police's conduct. Underground physiotherapists and doctors were faced with patients with serious injuries that are obviously from brutal beatings such as bone fractures with serious dislocations that will never heal. After the incident, the female raised a judicial review over police access of her medical records with a court warrant without her consent. The court later dismissed her bid, saying that her true motive was to know the scope of the police investigation. It is claimed that a newspaper showed the female was spotted leaving Hong Kong for Taiwan with no apparent injury to her eyes.

External videos
- Footage of the 1 October shooting incident (HKFP)

On 1 October 2019 a police officer shot with live ammunition at close range an 18-year-old man wielding a pipe. The man was attempting to strike the police officer, who had run in with a drawn revolver to rescue another officer who had been chased and beaten to the ground by a crowd of protesters wielding pipes. Protesters accused the officer of trying to kill the man, claiming that the force used by the protesters was insufficient to justify the use of live ammunition and that the officer had less lethal weapons at his disposal. That day, five other live rounds were fired in various locations. UK Foreign Secretary Dominic Raab said: "Whilst there is no excuse for violence, the use of live ammunition is disproportionate and only risks inflaming the situation". The police defended the officer's actions, saying that the officer's and his colleague's lives were at risk. On 14 October 2019, Hong Kong police shot a 14-year-old child in the leg with a live round. Police claim that the shot was meant to have been fired into the air and that the shooting was accidental. The third shooting incident occurred in Sai Wan Ho on 11 November 2019. A traffic cop drew his service weapon at an unarmed white-clad man near a roadblock and then grappled with him. He then shot a black-clad protester whom the police accused of trying to wrest the gun from him. The 21-year-old man was rushed to hospital with injury to liver and kidney; another protester who was shot needed no emergency operation. On 17 November 2019, during a clash between the police and protestors in the area around Hong Kong Polytechnic University, a long-range sound device was used and police warned that live rounds would be used if they met with "deadly weapons". It is also notable that few police officers were injured by long-range projectiles, such as arrows and metal balls, by the protesters sieged in the Hong Kong Polytechnic University. The press found that Raptors equipped with AR-15 were patrolling around the clash zones.

=== Mistreatment of detainees ===
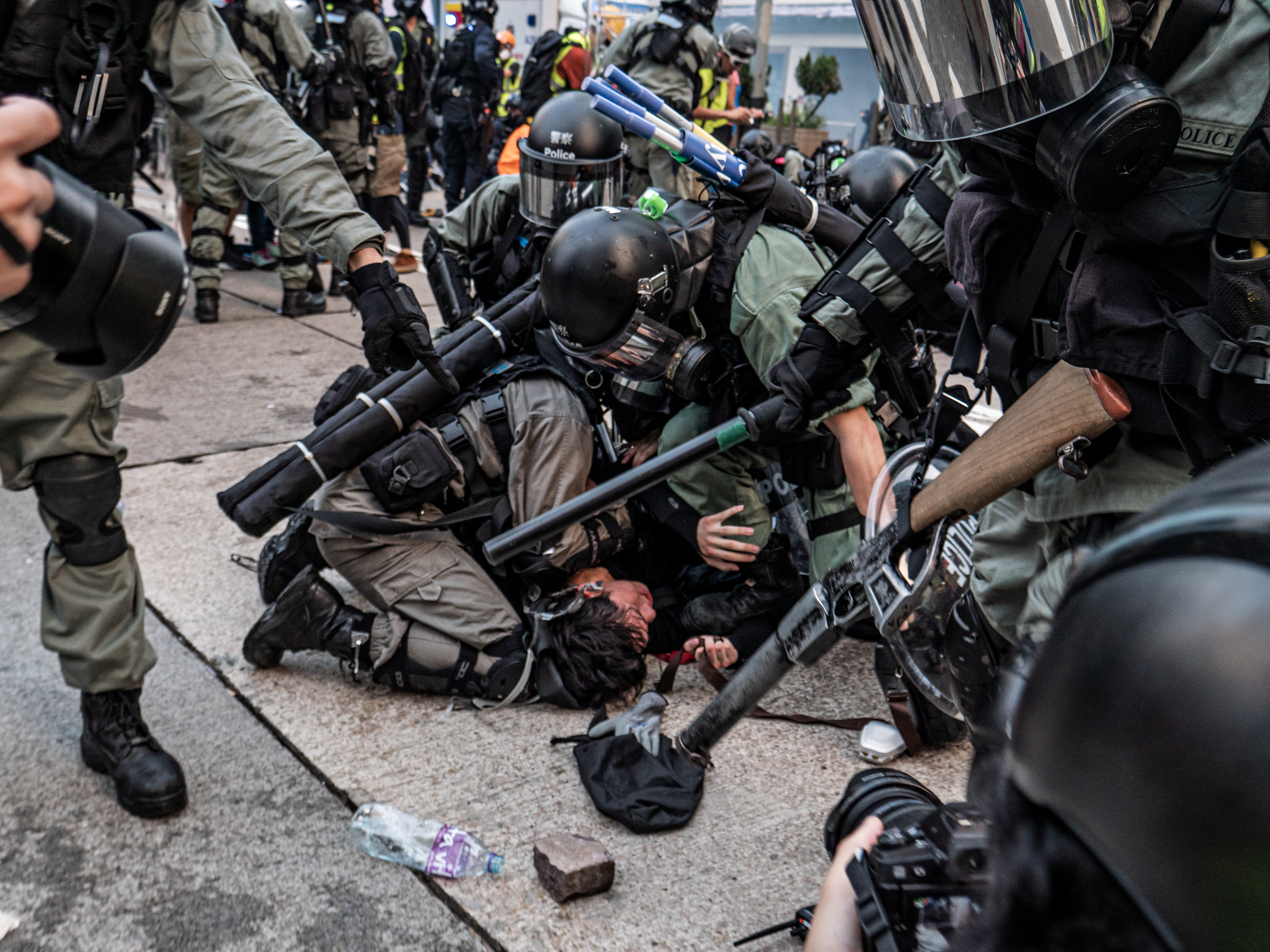
Hong Kong police subduing a protester

Since the protests began, police officers have come under criticism as images and videos surfaced showing their treatment of protesters who had been arrested. There have been numerous instances where officers have been accused of abusing protesters after they had been subdued, and the police have either denied or been provocative in their responses. Riot police officers have been seen in online videos surrounding subdued protesters, kicking, punching, or clubbing them, to be stopped only by residents or by colleagues. Another common technique is kneeling on the necks of protesters to subdue them; or banging demonstrator's heads to the ground, causing further injury; stomping on the heads of subdued protesters during arrests are commonplace. Police also often dragged already subdued protesters along the ground – a tactic defended by the claim that they had been "uncooperative".

In widely circulated video recordings of an alleged assault on 21 September in Yuen Long, an unarmed volunteer from the Protect Our Kids Campaign was arrested and taken to an alley and surrounded by about 30 riot police officers and apparently abused. The volunteer, having shouted at a police officer who had pepper-sprayed a 73-year-old colleague, was then dragged into the midst of a group of police and kicked. He was later taken to hospital. The incident was filmed by a local resident; police attempted to disrupt the filming by shining flashlights at the camera. In response to the allegation, Senior Superintendent Vasco Williams asserted that officers had kicked a "yellow object", Police finally acknowledged that the "object" in the video was indeed a man, but denied officers had kicked the man, who police accuse of having bitten an officer. Claudia Mo condemned Williams for dehumanising the protesters. The assault is a reminder of an incident during the 2014 Hong Kong protests in which seven police officers dragged an activist into a secluded location and took turns to assault him for several minutes.

The police were also accused of tampering with evidence. When Fong Chung-yin was arrested for possessing "offensive weapons" – which were found to be unpowered laser pointers – police officers inserted batteries into his laser pointers to show to the press that laser pointers can cause a fire. The press expressed concern that the police had interfered with the judicial process. A video of an arrest of a protester on 11 August appeared to show a police officer placing a stick inside the protestor's backpack, but the police force denied accusations and said that the protester had held the stick before he was arrested.

While the police maintain that they have respected the "privacy, dignity and rights" of those in custody according to regulations, allowing detainees transport to hospitals and communication with lawyers and their families", Amnesty International criticised them for "arbitrary arrest and retaliatory violence against arrested persons in custody", and described some of these violent actions as "torture". In some of the cases, the police were found shining laser lights directly into a detainee's eyes in an attempt to retaliate, and beating detainees for maintaining the right to silence. Some detainees reported sustaining injuries ranging from head wounds to fractured arms following their arrests and some were admitted to hospital after their detention. In September, 31 people detained in San Uk Ling were sent to North District Hospital, among whom six were seriously injured with bone fractures. The police prevented lawmakers from inspecting the San Uk Ling Holding Centre, where many of the detainees were held. The request by six justices of the peace to visit the centre was rejected. The police ceased using the holding centre to "stop speculations". Robert Godden, the cofounder of Rights Exposure, a British human rights group, reported that arrestees were deprived of sleep and had limited access to food. He also reported hearing "howls of pain" that had "went on for five minutes" during his time in detention inside a police station in Ho Man Tin. In May 2020, local human rights group Civil Rights Observer criticised the police for allegedly "systematically" infringing the human rights of the detainees, who have reported being beaten by police with baton inside the station. One interviewee added that officers slammed his head into the door of a police car repeatedly. The organisation can be amounted as violations of United Nations Convention against Torture.

The police were accused of sexually abusing protesters. In Tin Shui Wai, the crotch of a female protester was exposed during the arrest process. The female protester in question also alleged that an officer verbally abused her, calling her "prostitute". A female protester accused police officers of conducting a gloveless strip search on her and allegedly using a pen to spread her legs open. The police denied the accusation. A student from Chinese University of Hong Kong accused a male police of hitting her breast during her detention in the San Uk Ling Holding Centre and reported that other detainees "have suffered sexual assaults and torture by more than one officer, regardless of gender". It was later revealed a male spread the online rumours of police sex assaults on women at the detention centre and was sentenced to 13 months' imprisonment.

According to a survey by Association Concerning Sexual Violence Against Women (ACSVAW), 23 women out of 221 respondents blamed the police for sexually harassing them, eight of them reporting that they suffered sexual violence while they were in detention.

Some detainees reported that the police had denied them access to lawyers. Some lawyers have reported that the police have obstructed them from meeting their clients, and that they were reluctant to co-operate. The Police Public Relations Branch said that all the allegations against the centre were "unnamed", "unverified" and "untrue", that it had been nothing more than a standard detention facility, used in line with police regulations. The spokesman further added that the decision "has nothing to do with the groundless allegations of police of misconduct, and that it was a necessary step "to avoid any further public speculation and unnecessary remarks" as to its continued use.

=== Climate of fear ===
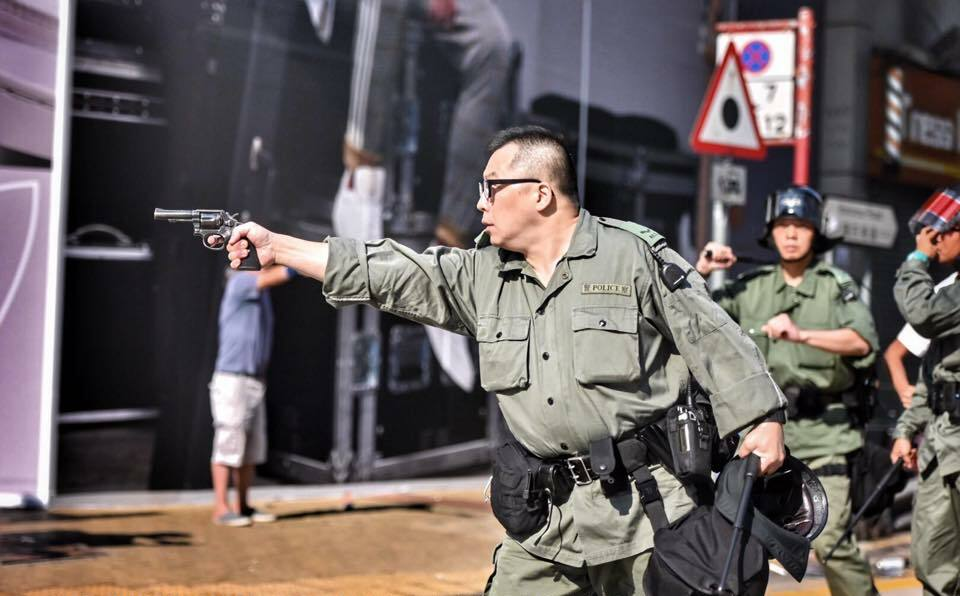
A police officer draws his gun against protesters

The Hong Kong Police Force has been accused of instilling a general climate of fear: The police were also accused of making arbitrary arrests by the Amnesty International. Lawmaker Ted Hui added that the police, after failing to arrest the radical protesters, turned to arrest peaceful protesters, bystanders, young people in general, and people wearing black clothes. The allegations resurfaced after a rally on New Year's Day, during which more than 400 people were arrested, including three members from Civil Rights Observer. Police have admitted that some of the detainees may have been innocent bystanders, but said that such people would be released "after further enquiries". Legislator Alvin Yeung said that mass arrests were "totally unreasonable and groundless", and demanded if police had "any instructions or any legal basis to conduct the preemptive arrests"

On 23 June 2019, representatives from the medical, health services, and legal sectors on the Hong Kong Election Committee jointly proclaimed that police had arrested five people seeking public hospital treatment after having eavesdropped on nurses' conversations, and threatened some nurses to try to obtain patient details. The representatives urged the police to respect patient confidentiality, so that patients can seek the care they needed from hospitals without fear. The staff from Tuen Mun Hospital staged a sit-in on 18 October to protest that male officers were being allowed to enter the hospital's maternity ward; armed riot police had also intruded in the hospital, disrupting its operations and scaring patients and staff. As police had been conducted hospital arrests, protesters became reluctant to go to public hospitals for treatment. Pierre Chan, the lawmaker representing the Medical sector, claimed to have evidence that police had access to data on patients "because of a loophole". He added that many of those injured in protests opted not to go for treatment for fear of arrest, and those medical professionals treating the wounded feared being charged by the police. Underground mobile clinics sprang up, operating out of borrowed cars, which many patients attended, often staffed by junior doctors who wished to remain anonymous, fearing arrest or repercussions from their employers.

Police banned a protest in Yuen Long on 27 July due to fears that protesters may have clashed with local villagers. But after that protest, the police continued to ban marches in various places in Hong Kong. On 18 August, the Civil Human Rights Front (CHRF) held an approved rally at Victoria Park, and went ahead with an unauthorised march, which more than a million people attended. The demonstration was largely peaceful and CHRF filed a judicial review challenging the police decision to ban the demonstration. As police had rarely banned marches previously, CHRF representatives criticised the more recent bans by the police, alleging that refusal to issue permits had eroded Hong Kong's freedom of demonstration.

On 29 and 30 August, just a day before the proposed march on 31 August, the police arrested at least eight high-profile activists, including Joshua Wong, Agnes Chow, and Chan Ho-tin, as well as lawmakers including Cheng Chung-tai and Jeremy Tam. RTHK reported that Au Nok-hin was arrested for allegedly assaulting and obstructing a police officer during a protest on 8 July, while Apple Daily reported that the lawmaker was accused of assaulting the officer with a megaphone that was "too loud". Demosisto's vice-chairperson Isaac Cheng condemned the police for rounding up various activists to frighten Hong Kong people from protesting, even though these protests have been leaderless.

The treatment of medical and paramedic personnel at the hands of the police during the siege of Polytechnic University was criticised by Hong Kong surgeon Darren Mann as having a "chilling effect [on] would-be volunteers from offering their services in the much-needed medical care of injured people".

== Sexual Violence, Sexual Assault and Sexual Harassment ==
As being reported, excessive use of police forces and police violence were being used during the two years of protest that took place on the street of Hong Kong, not only happened when the marches took place in the public area but during the invisible and concealed time after they have arrested protestors and brought them back to the police station.

=== #ProtestToo Rally ===
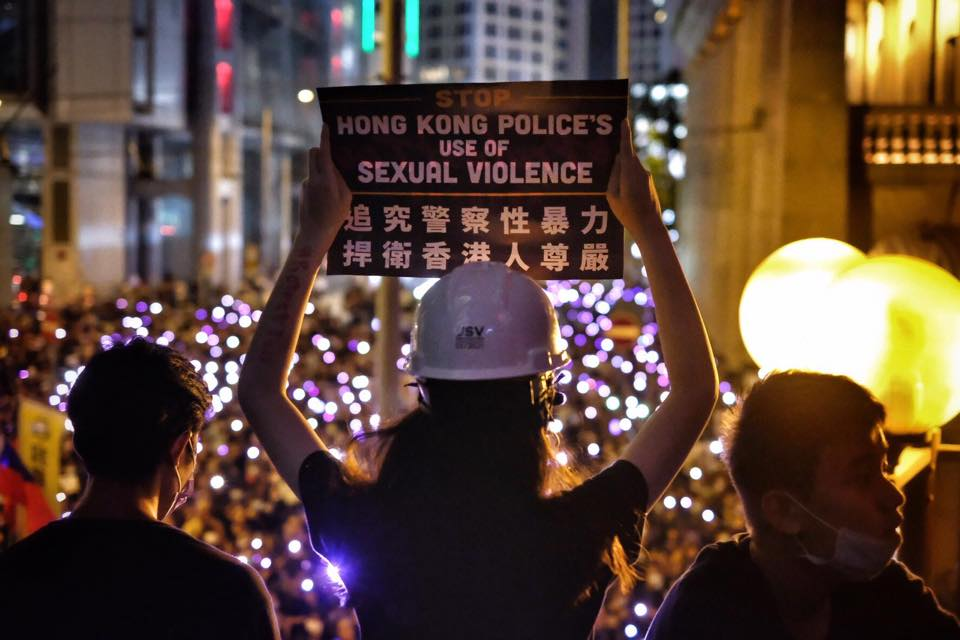
#ProtestToo Rally in the Chater Garden, Central

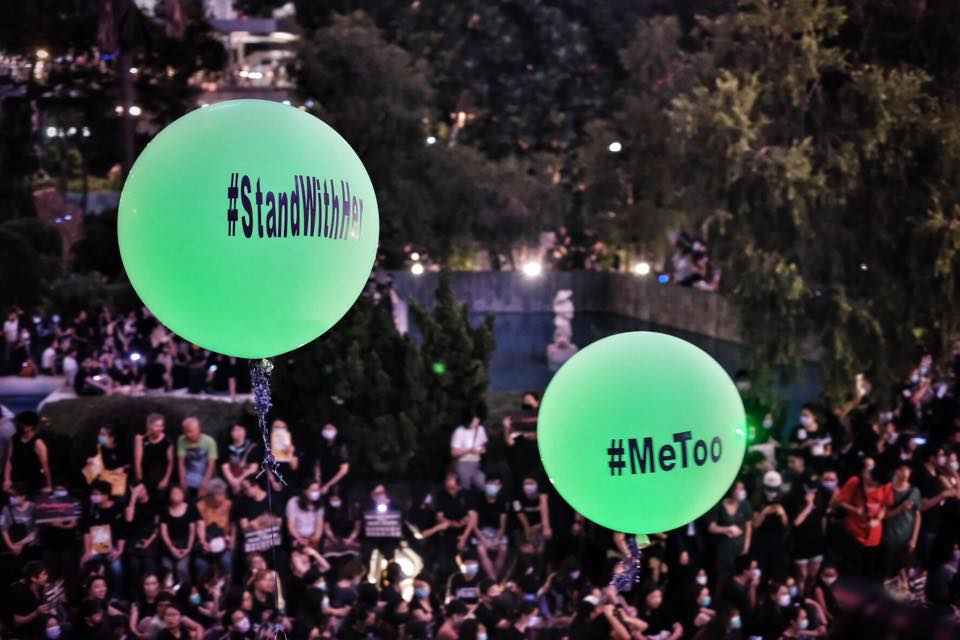
#MeToo Rally in Hong Kong

A #Metoo rally, #ProtestToo, was held in the Chater Garden in Central on 28 August 2019, to oppose police's sexual violence during the protests towards the protestors, both male and female. The representative of the organizer, Women's Coalition on Equal Opportunities, Linda Wong has referred to the police forces as "In the name of law enforcement, police are using sexual violence as an instrument of intimidation, the coalition resolutely demands the police force seriously investigate and make accountable acts of sexual violence committed by officers during the anti-extradition bill protests." Protestors had gathered for a sit-in movement, holding slogans and signs, such as "Stop Hong Kong Police's use of sexual violence", "Don't tell me not to protest, tell them not to violate.", "Speak out, Stay Strong.", and so on, also holding purple ribbons along with lit-up purple flashlights with their phones, to demonstrate their support for the victims of the Hong Kong police's mistreating actions during the protest. 30000 people attended the rally, according to the official statistics recorded by the organization while local media reported less than half of the number.

During the rally, several protestors have stood up and spoken about their experiences with sexual violence performed by the police, some broke down in tears many times while giving speeches. Most of them have mentioned strip-searching, one mentioned being verbally abused by a male officer for calling her a prostitute. One of the female protestors has claimed that she has been forcefully fed with diuretics, then her genital was being rubbed with hard objects by the police, which has led to the result of urinary incontinence. "Some officers use a forcefully grab male protesters by the crotch", two students from the rally stated that the actions of police's sexual misconduct were towards all genders, "This is a combination of both men and women. Anyone who is taken in by the police shouldn't be sexually abused"

=== Inquiries and Survey ===
Under the social pressure of being ashamed and terrified of being known as being part of the protest, publicly reporting the cases had become almost impossible. However, according to Hong Kong Equal Opportunities Watchdog, there are more than 300 inquiries mostly regarding the police's sexual discrimination in the few months since the protest started. No actual accusations were made because of the concern involving the officers' improper actions during inspection and arrest. Ricky Chu, Watchdog chief has stated that people have officially started to inquire in late June after the spread of the footage of police exposing the private area of a female protestor in a skirt to the press by dragging her on the ground.

The Association Concerning Sexual Violence Against Women published an online survey, "Anti-ELAB' sexual Violence Experience Online Survey", on 21 August 2019, around two months after the protest has begun. This anonymous survey allows people to report without being afraid to be exposed, 67 out of 221 respondents have experienced sexual violence related to the protest, including verbal threat and harassment, physical abuse, sexual assault, and unlawful sexual activities were being demonstrated by perpetrators, both police and anti-protestors. 52 victims have mentioned the reason why they have not reported the cases, due to their distrust towards the law enforcement, and expressed their concern about being detained for other offences, doubting the police's enforcement of the law and not having enough information about the perpetrator.

=== Alleged Cases ===
Many protestors claimed on been sexually harassed and assaulted throughout the movement of protesting, actions such as female protestors being filmed and being exposed with only underwear while being arrested in the police station, as well as the shameful and unessential removal of clothing, were being embodied. The action of reporting the assaults and harassment had led to several hateful results, including personal information being revealed online, being a victim of fake sexual video, and telephone harassment from anonymous people who believed to be police and citizens who are against the protestors. Only a few out of much sexual violence towards female protestors were being photographed by the journalist, male police exposed protestors' underwear and private area in front of the public while being carried and dragged, protestors' breasts were grabbed by the police, being forced to reveal the upper body as the polices has lifted the female protestor's top.

==== Sonia Ng ====
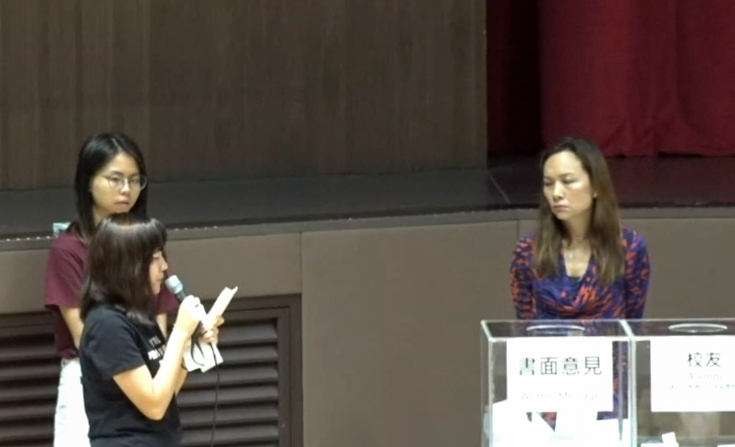
Sonia Ng speaking in the student forum, CUHK

Sonia Ng, a student from the Chinese University of Hong Kong (CUHK), claimed the Hong Kong Police sexually assaulted her and others in a speech at a public forum at university grounds. She, along with other students, asked vice-chancellor Rocky Tuan to condemn alleged police brutality.

In the declaration that the Hong Kong Police has released after Sonia Ng's speech, they said, "So far, the Complaints Against Police Office has not received any complaint of sexual assault related to the San Uk Ling Detention Centre. We will proactively contact the female and appeal to her to provide concrete evidence so that we can launch a fair fact-finding investigation as soon as possible.", stating that they are aware of the case. Ng said she did not trust the Complaints Against Police Office and that she would take her case directly to university chancellor Carrie Lam.

==== Ms. Lui ====
At a news conference on 23 August 2019, Ms. Lui has accused the unnecessary and insulting strip-search, which led to depression and the fear of seeing officers. Lui has also suffered from physical injuries at the hospital since the arrest in previous weeks. When she should be heading to the court from the day that she could leave the hospital, Lui was brought to the closest police station and being locked up in a room by two female officers instead, she was told to undress until fully naked for body search for 15 to 30 minutes, as they claimed that she is a criminal. The officers has physically knocked her hands away when she tried to hide her private areas. Lui's thigh area then has been tapped by the officers with a pen, ordering her to spread her legs wider, when she was following the command to do squats and move around. Lui questioned, "I want to ask the police: does being arrested mean our rights are deprived and we could be treated without basic respect for women?", she has been visually sexual harassed by a female officer and been witnessed by more than 10 male officers, as the police have opened the door when she is fully unclothed.

==== Ms. X ====
An 18-years-old female protestor has not been publicly revealed her own identity but goes by Ms. X as her alias. She filed a complaint to the police on 22 October 2019, that a number of masked officers have gang-raped her in the Tsuen Wan Police Station on 27 September 2019. Ms. X had an abortion at the Queen Elizabeth Hospital after, then allowed the police to search for at least one of the perpetrators, by collecting DNA from the aborted fetus. The action of trying to discredit her has been demonstrated through the spreading of the details of her case and her real identity, police have asserted claiming Ms. X is "a little bit mental", the force has also searched from her private medic centre for her medical history without her permission, along with the records before the incident on 4 November 2019. Ms. X challenged the search warrant, as well as the information leak of rape victims to the public to the court, she stated that she could not trust the law enforcement for any cases and investigations relating to the police forces as they are performed "grossly unprofessional" actions in her case of leaking her personal information and insulting comments. On 6 April, the Department of Justice said her police report would not be taken any further citing contrary evidence and, as of May 2020, Ms. X was facing arrest for allegedly misleading detectives.

==== Student K ====
On 25 September 2019, a 17-year-old student, Student K, was arrested at Sha Tin MTR station suspected of illegal assembly and attacking one of the police, she reported her case to the press and public 10 months later, on 20 July 2020. Student K claimed her breasts have been groped by a female officer.

=== Public Reactions ===
==== Government Officials ====
The Executive Councillor of the Government of Hong Kong, Fanny Law was on a radio show by RTHK on 9 September 2019, where she has stated that young females are offering free sex to the front line protestors, "We have confirmed that this is a true case. I am so sad for these young girls who have been misled into offering free sex.", while has also described protestors as "actors". Avery Man-yuen Ng, the Chairman of the League of Social Democrats, responded that he believes that "sex should always be free and out of love", then mentioned that he thinks there is no reason that the protestors are risking their safety to face tear gas and bullets, to have sex which also could be gotten somewhere else without the danger.

==== Smear Campaigns ====
"Hong Kong police, rape and murder", an original photo of Ji-yuet Wong, a Hong Kong activist and former spokesperson of Scholarism, holding the sign during the #ProtestToo rally, has been photoshopped to "Hong Kong comfort woman, free sex with cockroaches"

A freelance journalist, Amy Ip, who has been abused online since she has spoken out against law enforcement during a police press conference on 21 October 2019, "It causes serious damage to Hong Kong's press freedom," Ip held a flashlight at the officers, and said, "This is how you have treated us with your flashlights – so that we can't see the evil deeds that you are doing." She has protested against the violent behaviour of the police toward reporters during the middle of the conference, reading her statement claiming that the media has been disrupted from reporting the news, "Last night, multiple riot police officers blatantly blocked us from reporting, unreasonably pushed reporters and pulled off our gas masks, fired tear spray and rubber bullets at us – causing injuries to multiple reporters. A female journalist was unreasonably detained for seven hours after her identity was checked," As she was shown in front of the public during the live police conference, Ip's personal details such as her full name, pictures, phone numbers and so one were being circulated on the internet, including social media platforms and pro-government news pages, her press ID was also being widely spread in pro-Beijing social media after the police photographed it. She was being defamed with a sex tape that the internet claimed as the woman in the video as Ip, they have also made a statement of her offering free sex for protestors, Ip said, "For a few days I received anonymous phone calls at night. My whole family was so worried, I was under the spotlight accidentally. My mum considered leaving the country."

== Crowd control tactics ==
=== Undercover operatives as agents provocateurs ===
The police were accused of using undercover officers to infiltrate the protesters. These officers refused to show their identification numbers when approached by journalists. Then-deputy police chief Chris Tang admitted that the Force had deployed undercover officers who were disguised as various "characters," but he refused to disclose how many agents were involved.

Undercover officers have been accused of committing arson: a video circulating on the internet showed what appeared to be undercover officers who proceeded to set fire to the Wan Chai MTR station. Another showed Molotov cocktails thrown in the Wan Chai area by black bloc who appeared to have distinctive markers of police operatives. Senior Superintendent Kelvin Kong said that undercover operatives' main objective was to arrest radical and violent protesters; he rejected claims that officers partook in arson, saying "The police would never commit any illegal acts, let alone arson, when we are in disguise." Another video showed plain-clothes officers exiting a police vehicle and proceeding to dig up bricks from the pavement; the police had no comment. The police were found to have deployed undercover officers during the 31 August protest, one of whom fired a warning shot. Police claimed that the undercover officer has identified himself before shooting. An officer dressed as a black bloc protester was found inside Sheung Shui station which was closed at the time. When the officer realised he was being recorded, he aimed his flashlight at the camera and threatened to pepper spray the cameraman. The police have since acknowledged that he was a plain-clothed officer "conducting an investigation."

There have been incidents where riot police have mistaken undercover operatives as protesters when making arrests or when using pepper spray; police claimed these to have been "misunderstandings," leading to accusations that either uniformed police have been acting abusively and arbitrarily, or that the plainclothes officers had committed unlawful acts and were caught by riot police.

=== Tear gas usage ===
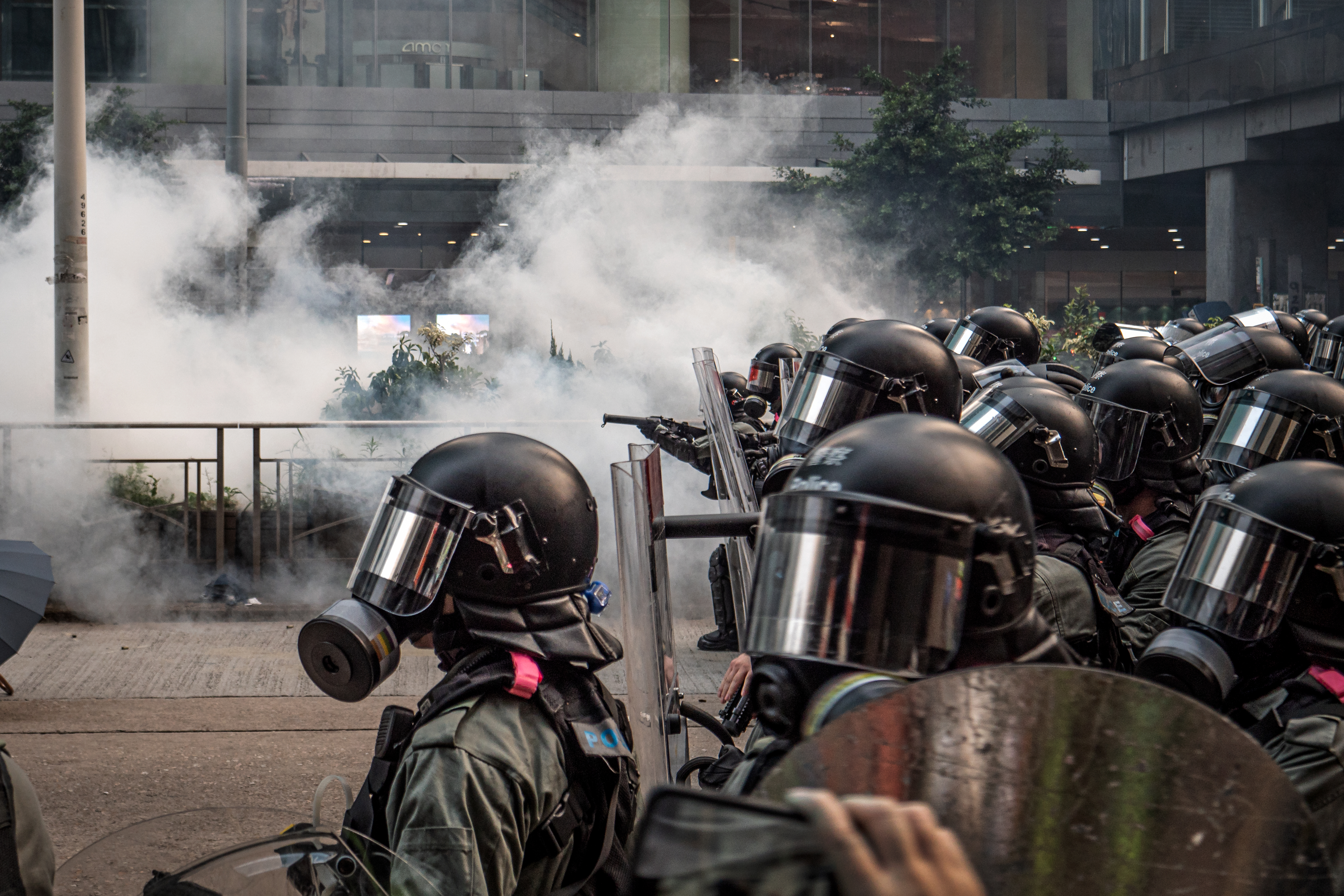
The police used tear gas to disperse the protesters

The Hong Kong Police Force fired more than 10,000 volleys of tear gas in the five months between the start of protests in June 2019 and November 2019. Police were criticised by pan-democrat legislators for firing teargas at the CITIC Tower from several directions on 12 June, effectively forcing a group of protesters against the building because it was impossible to evacuate. Police use of tear gas often affected bystanders, and children, the elderly, and pets residing near protests. The public has complained of tear gas being shot near a home for the elderly and in the corridor of a public housing estate. Police have been observed firing tear gas on empty roads after the protestors had retreated or dispersed, or lobbed over walls of a police station – a tactic defended as necessary to create safe buffer.

Several video clips captured tear gas canisters apparently being fired from high up of the Government Headquarters, which Police Foundation president, Jim Bueermann described as "reckless" and potentially lethal because of the velocity canisters fired from a height can attain by the time they reach ground level. The police denied improper use, claiming the canisters filmed were "optical illusion" of canisters that had been fired from lower levels. Police shooting sponge grenades from the rooftop of Kwun Tong police station on 4 August was also against international safety guidelines.

Deployment of tear gas inside Kwai Fong station on 11 August was condemned by experts, as indoor use may cause a stampede and the concentrated chemicals pose severe health risks without adequate ventilation. Media was concerned about the use of tear gas as it may harm innocent commuters, and accused the police – who called the station a "semi-open space" – of creating a "gas chamber".

Since 28 July civilians and protesters have collected spent canisters and found that some of the used canisters had been past their use-by date. On 12 August the police admitted that they had used "canisters of tear gas past their use-by date". Karen Mak, a lecturer from the University of Hong Kong, told RTHK that expired tear gas, upon heating, may produce toxic gases such as phosgene and cyanide, though the police insisted that the expired tear gas would not induce additional harmful effects.

Citizens have been directly hit and injured by exploding tear gas canisters. On 2 November a volunteer medic was struck and seriously burned. The medic, a student of Hong Kong Shue Yan University (SYU), did not have a gas mask and was surrounded only by journalists and other medics at the time of the incident. The university expressed "serious concern" over the incident and requested details from the police, as SYU students rallied in support of the injured medic and condemned police violence.

The extensive use of tear gas sparked public health concerns as residents feared that when heated, the chemicals may react and release dioxin. A reporter was diagnosed with chloracne, a condition associated with over-exposure to dioxins, following sustained exposure to tear gas. The Food and Environmental Hygiene Department have refused to disclose the chemical composition of the gas, as the police wished to keep it secret. The Department of Health and Hong Kong Poison Information Centre of Hospital Authority reported that there was no literature or scientific evidence on dioxin poisoning cases from tear gas exposure. The Environmental Protection Department suggested that they had found no anomalies in dioxin concentration levels. Secretary Wong Kam-sing commented that the burning of items by protesters would be the cause for any increase in dioxin concentration.

=== Kettling ===
Police kettled a group of protesters near the CITIC Tower on 12 June. Streams of teargas forced protesters against the building with nowhere to go.

During the 14 July protest in Sha Tin, conflict broke out inside New Town Plaza after the police stormed the shopping centre and prevented people inside from leaving. The police had ordered the closure of the MTR station, which is accessible through the mall, making it impossible for people to evacuate. The Civil Rights Observer criticised this tactic as risking the safety of other bystanders, while Civic Party lawmaker Alvin Yeung accused police of "chasing people like a pack of wolves, pepper-spraying and beating them indiscriminately", and asked the police to publicly explain why they concluded that there were unlawful activities inside the mall that warranted fully equipped riot police moving in. Yeung questioned why police failed to stop further ingress and to give sufficient time for bystanders inside to evacuate. As a consequence, more than 20 people were admitted to hospital – two in critical condition and four with serious injuries.

=== Cutting short rallies ===
During the Reclaim Tuen Mun Park march on 21 September 2019, the police displayed a warning flag several minutes after the legal, authorized march has begun. Two and a half hours after the official start, and while many were still waiting to leave the starting point, police abruptly withdrew their approval for an authorised rally on New Year's Day, citing violence, and required all demonstrators to disperse within 30 to 45 minutes; 400 people were arrested, many for illegal assembly, including three human rights observers. The organisers criticised the police order to disperse the million marchers within such a short period was not reasonable. Alvin Yeung criticised the cancellation and subsequent arrests as being tantamount to be entrapment for illegal assembly.

=== Impact on reporting ===
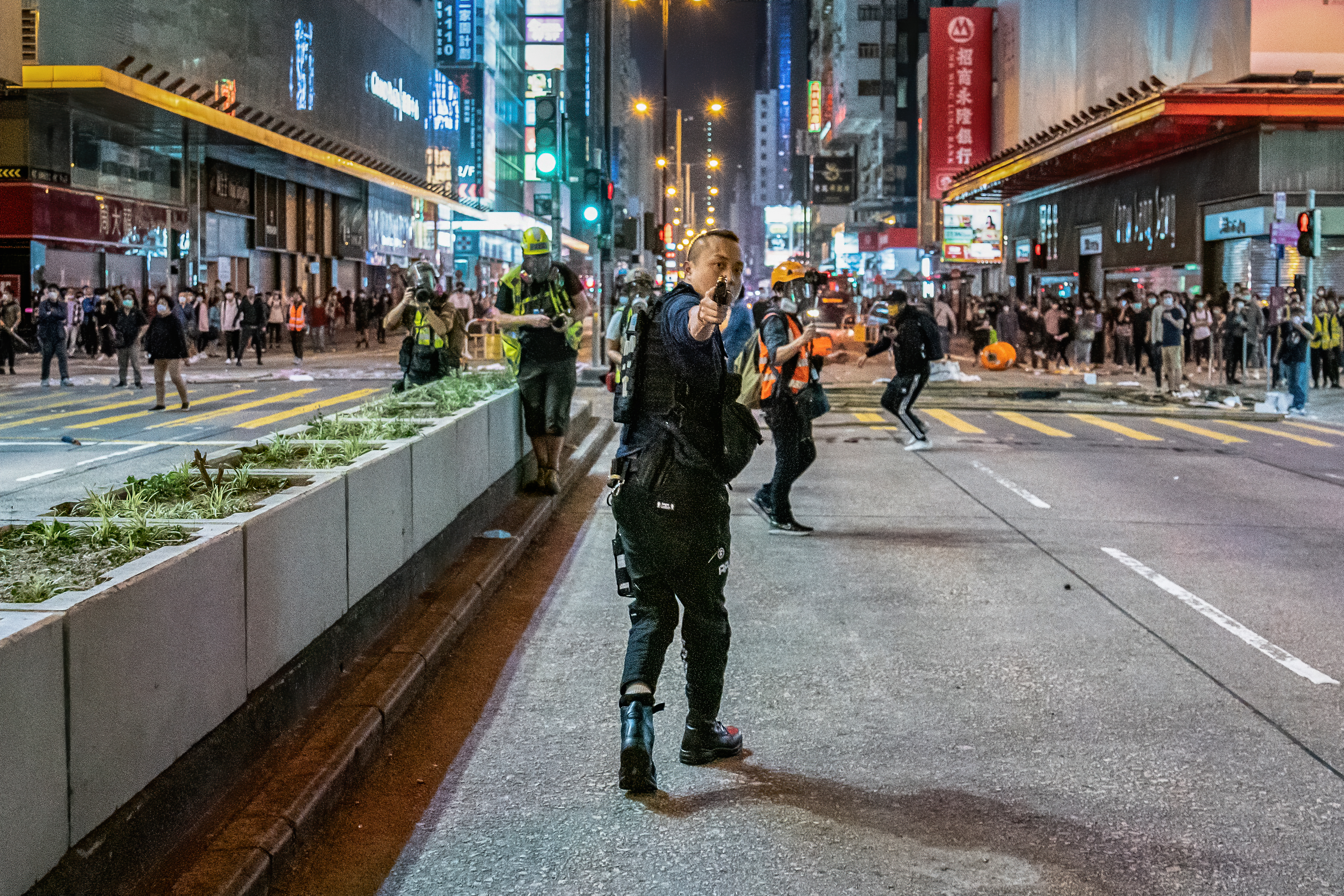
Police officer draws his gun on a reporter on 29 February 2020.

The police have been accused of interfering with freedom of the press and of assaulting journalists during protests. Incidents cited by journalist associations include being assaulted or being "deliberately jostled", of which 27 cases were documented in June alone; pushed, beaten, and pepper-sprayed; and shining strobes or other high-intensity lighting at journalists or blocking line of sight to prevent or obstruct reporting. These actions, according to Hong Kong Journalists Association, were perpetrated by the police even after yellow-vested journalists had disclosed their identities. On 6 August, a reporter from Tai Kung Pao was temporarily detained for assaulting a police officer. During the 31 August protests, police refused to let reporters enter Prince Edward station – which the HKJA condemned as an infringement of their rights. In the absence of trustworthy sources, rumours about deaths spread, further eroding trust. Journalists were also surrounded by uniformed officers and prevented from asking suspected undercover officers questions. In September, Committee to Protect Journalists cited news reports and online videos and noted that police had targeted teargas canisters directly at several people in Causeway Bay who were clearly identified as journalists. One projectile hit a journalist in the helmet and then exploded near another. After implementation of the anti-mask law, officers were observed forcibly removing reporters' respirators and masks, despite clarification by secretary John Lee that reporters were exempted from the law. The Foreign Correspondents' Club of Hong Kong – which had called for an independent investigation into police violence against journalists and interference with the media's right to cover the protests under the law since start of the protests in June – once again expressed its concern in September that violence against journalists and interference of their work were continuing unabated.

Hong Kong Journalists Association (HKJA) and the Press Photographers Association (HKPRA) issued a joint statement alleging that some police officers had treated journalists brutally and obstructed their work by pepper-spraying them in a weekend protest in Kowloon, and decried violence and intimidation directed at journalists. During the clashes between protesters and police, nine journalists from different media were affected and two had pepper-spray directed at their faces. Some were also shot by rubber bullets, or sprayed by water cannon trucks. Their equipment was also damaged by the police. Due to sustained exposure to tear gas, some journalists reported having symptoms such as breathing difficulty and persistent coughing. The HKJA staged a silent march against police brutality on 14 July which attracted 1,500 people, and the association had already filed at least 10 complaints relating to these injuries to the Independent Police Complaints Council. Indonesian journalist Veby Mega Indah's right eye was permanently blinded after she was hit by a rubber bullet at close range on 29 September. Police said that some people dressed as journalists had "counterfeit press badges" and had "attacked police officers".

On 28 October 2019, Hong Kong Free Press photojournalist May James was arrested while working in Mong Kok. According to the Foreign Correspondents Club, although she had been wearing a press vest and was carrying a valid press pass and other credentials, she was arrested and held overnight before being freed the next day. Police said that James was uncooperative, and had "refused to comply" when asked for her ID card, and James said she was probably arrested for asking masked officers to display their warrant cards. James had been arrested following an afternoon rally in Tsim Sha Tsui, during which police reportedly behaved violently toward other journalists.

Six reporters from different news organisations staged a silent protest at a routine police press conference on 4 November, when each wore a safety helmet with one Chinese character, which, when combined, read "investigate police violence, stop police lies" (Chinese: 查警暴止警謊). Police suspended the conference as the reporters refused to either take off their helmets or leave the venue, stopped its online live stream, and cancelled the entire press conference 20 minutes later. Coinciding with the protest they coordinated, HKJA and the Hong Kong Press Photographers Association issued a statement denouncing the arbitrary arrest of journalists. Later that day the police staged a live broadcast on Facebook to express their views on the protests over the weekend. In late November, i-Cable News became the first news organisation in Hong Kong to lodge a formal complaint against the police with the CAPO for mistreatment of at least 23 of its staff over the previous five months. The catalogue of incidents included being obstructed from reporting, pushed, pepper-sprayed, tear-gassed, hit with water cannon, and targeted with strong flashlights, and had their gas masks forcibly removed.

The HKJA and the HKPRA accused a police officer of doxxing after the officer had stopped and searched a reporter and deliberately held his ID card in front of a live-streaming camera. Police admitted that "[t]here was something inappropriate about the police officer who was responsible for stopping and searching [the reporter]", and promised to "actively look into the incident", while the Privacy Commissioner for Personal Data said that there was "prima facie evidence" the law had been broken.'

A journalist from NBC accused the police of sexually assaulting her during the protest on 26 January. She was then pepper-sprayed after she attempted to ask other officers the ID number of the said officer.

=== Impact on first-aid services ===
The police were accused of arresting first aiders with false accusations, which prompted hospital staff to stage sit-in protests. The police were also accused of obstructing emergency medical treatment for arrested protesters. For instance, the police prevented first-aid workers from treating the wounded after the police stormed and locked down Prince Edward station on 31 August. Legislator and medical professional Kwok Ka-ki called that police strategy a "behaviour unbefitting of monsters".

After university student Chow Tsz-lok fell from the third floor of a car park to the second floor during a police dispersal operation in Tseung Kwan O, the police were accused of obstructing an ambulance from reaching him, delaying his treatment. Chow died four days later. But Leung Kwok-lai, the Fire Services Department assistant chief ambulance officer (Kowloon East), however, stated that the ambulance assigned to Chow was blocked by buses and private vehicles but that the ambulance did not come in contact with the police that were on duty.

The police arrested 51 volunteer medics during the siege of the Hong Kong Polytechnic University and held them. Police claimed that protesters were disguising themselves as medical workers, but Dr Arisina Ma, president of Hong Kong Public Doctors' Association, criticised the police for arresting the medical workers and detaining them for 24 hours and then forcing them to post bail instead of simply checking their professional identification and releasing them. Surgeon Darren Mann, who had witnessed medics being hogtied and who had telephoned both the Red Cross and Medecins Sans Frontieres asking them to intervene, criticised the police for treating medical personnel like terrorists. Writing in Lancet, he called police arrests of these first-aid workers "almost unheard of in civilised countries". With PolyU under complete lockdown, wounded protesters inside were deprived of all forms of first aid, until the Red Cross and Médecins Sans Frontières intervened.

=== Use of water cannons and other police vehicles ===
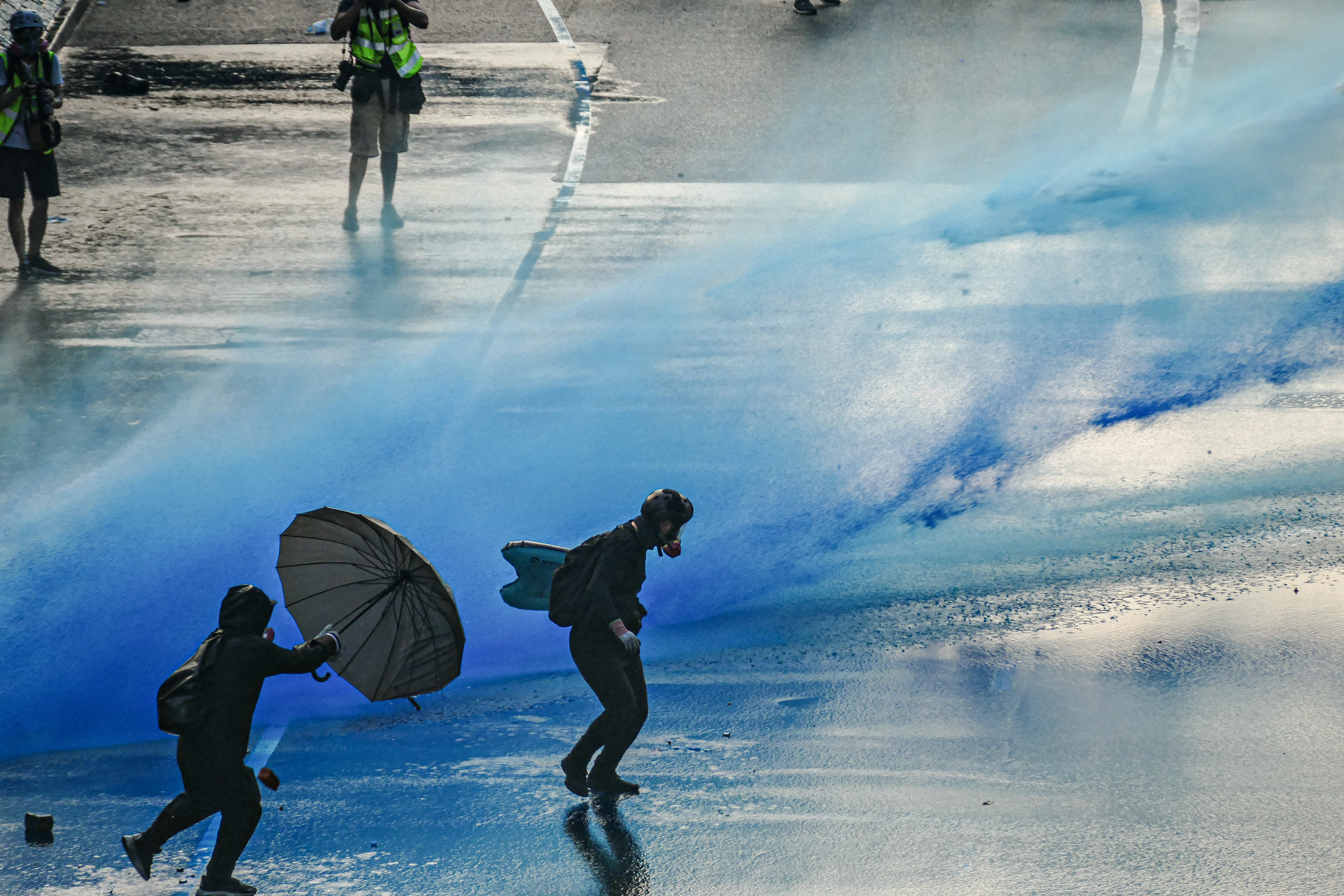
A water cannon truck firing blue-dyed liquid at protesters

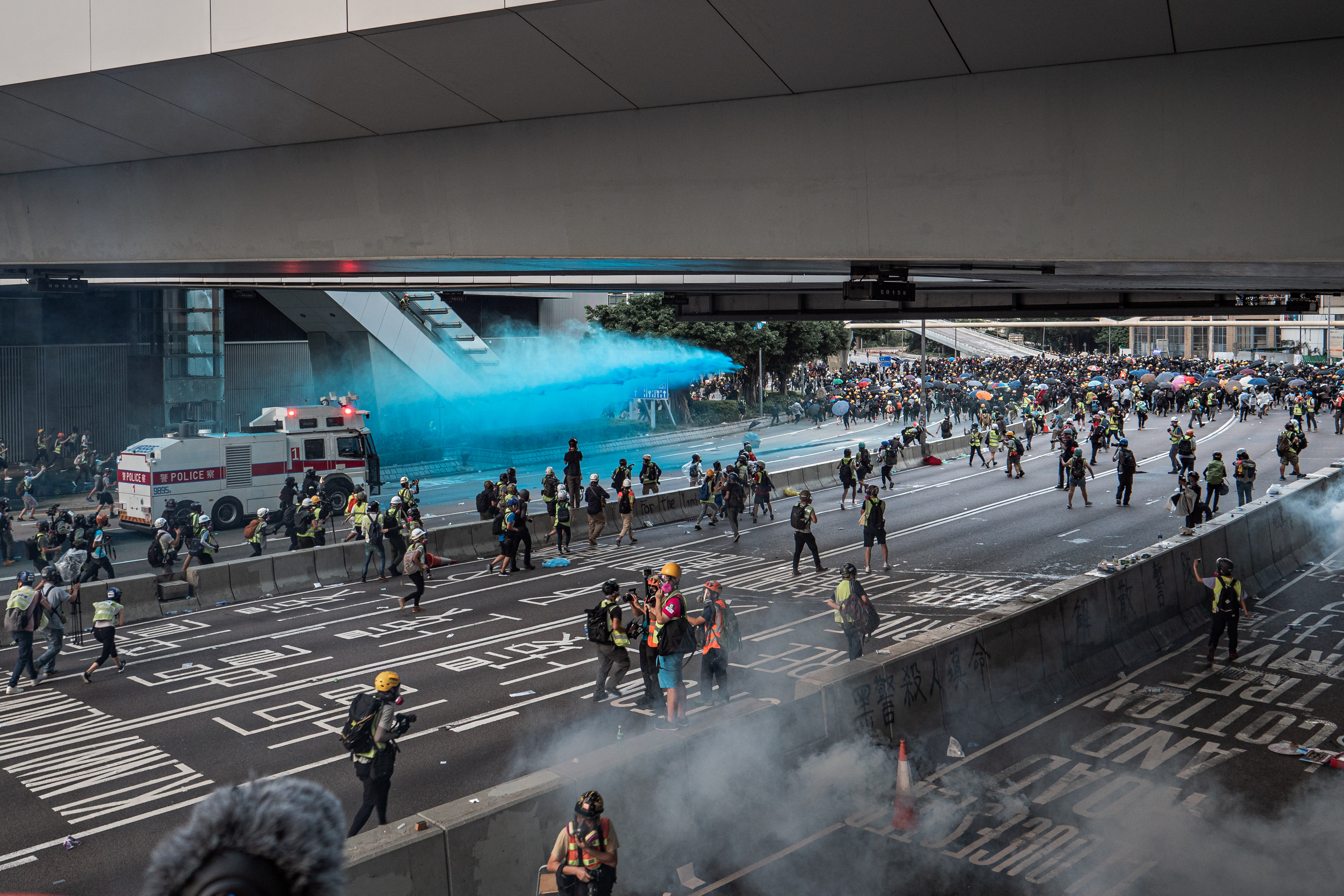
Another water cannon being fired

On 20 October 2019, police clearance actions saw blue-dyed water being sprayed on the gates of the Kowloon Mosque, leading to condemnation by CHRF and the Muslim community in Hong Kong. The police and chief executive Carrie Lam apologised to the Muslim leaders. But the former Indian Association of Hong Kong president Mohan Chugani, who was sprayed outside the mosque alongside lawmaker Jeremy Tam and businessman Phillip Khan, refused to accept Lam's apology, while Khan believed that the police intentionally sprayed the mosque and that the act was an "insult to the Islamic religion".

A traffic police officer was accused of driving his motorcycle into a crowd of protesters in Kwai Chung on 11 November, resulting in two injuries. The officer was then suspended from duty and the police explained that the motorcyclist "tried to separate his colleagues and the rioters" after an officer had temporarily lost his vision from protesters spraying an unknown substance in his face.

On 18 November, in Yau Ma Tei, a police van suddenly accelerated into a crowd of protesters, causing a stampede in which STS officers exiting from the van chased after protesters; the police defended the high-speed driving by their officers: "[driving] fast doesn't mean it is unsafe". The police denied the stampede, but it was confirmed by the Fire Services Department.

=== Obstruction of justice ===
On the evening of 13 April 2020, the police intercepted a 21-year-old college student in Kwai Fong Estate near Kwai Chung Police Station and found 2 petrol bombs in their bags. After further investigations, a police officer was suspected of attempting to frame the protester for throwing a petrol bomb at the Police Station. On 20 April, a 38-year-old sergeant stationed in Kwai Tsing Police District was arrested for alleged "obstructing justice" as he self-directed the petrol bomb case.

=== Police requirements on surgical masks of arrestees ===
Several arrestees at a protest on 31 March 2020 were required by police to remove the metal strips from the surgical masks which they wore as a protection against the coronavirus pandemic, saying that these posed a danger. On 1 April, some lawyers and legislators condemned this requirement as an abuse of the health crisis.

=== COVID-19 restrictions ===
After the government had passed a law banning social gatherings of more than four persons during the COVID-19 pandemic, Hong Kong police issued warnings protestors for violating the restrictions. Civil Rights Observer, a human rights organisation, criticised the police for suppressing "expression and peaceful assemblies". The police responded by saying that their actions have strengthened "citizen's vigilance and discipline for public health".

=== Verbal abuse ===
Police officers face accusations of verbally assaulting protesters and journalists: in multiple videos, police officers shout "cockroaches" at protesters, bystanders and journalists alike. This epithet also appeared in an open letter from the chair of the Junior Police Officers Association (JPOA). The practice has continued unabated, and frontline officers continued using the term despite an internal memorandum from a senior police officer calling on his staff to desist. Accusing protesters of desecrating the graves of lawmaker Junius Ho's parents, the JPOA said the vandals "cannot be called human." Returning the insults, police are often referred to as "dogs", or "terrorists" for instilling terror into citizens. The police's public relations branch distanced itself from these claims, saying that it was not ideal for the force to use such terms, while a police community relations officer said that the term "cockroach" could be interpreted as a compliment because cockroaches are "full of life, and can survive in harsh conditions", while dogs are considered loyal and obedient; secretary for security John Lee said that citizens dissatisfied with police conduct can submit a complaint.

== Alleged conspiracy with criminals and consistency of law enforcement ==
During the 1 July march, protesters stormed the Legislative Council Complex and were met with little to no police resistance. When protesters stormed inside the building, they vandalised the interiors. The police retreated after the protesters broke in, which has prompted accusations of selective enforcement. The police's inaction was criticised by pan-democracy politicians to be an effort by the government to "discredit" the protesters and damage their image, whereas pro-establishment lawmaker Michael Tien praised the police's "restrained approach".

The slow police responses to the Yuen Long station attack by some 100 suspected triads wearing white, when they arrived 39 minutes after initial calls for help, was criticised. Police reported they received an unusually large volume of 999 calls at the time of the attack, and the nearby police station was shut. Six people were arrested in connection with the attack, but the fact that so few were arrested after the event triggered public outcry, and sparked accusations that the police colluded with triads. Officers in riot gear surrounded Nam Pin Wai village, but took no action against the white-clad men inside after making inquiries. Superintendent Yau Nai-keung claimed that no offensive weapons were found. Reports claimed to have media footages showing a white-clad man holding a metal bar standing next to police officers.

When protesters were attacked by men armed in rots in North Point and Tsuen Wan again on 5 August, the police response was once again condemned as "slow". Conflicts lasted for nearly half an hour; the protesters fought off the out-numbered men before the police arrived, according to some reports. None of the people responsible for these attacks have been arrested as of November 2019.

Pan-democrats also criticised the police for upholding a "double standard" in law enforcement, where they use excessive force to subdue young and often peaceful protesters while showing leniency to violent counter-protesters and even not carry out any arrests against them. They cited an incident where a suspect was allowed to use a police shield to hide his identity as an example. The police denied the accusation.

== Police responses ==
Commenting on the analyses of videos by The Washington Post, police said that "in general, many media and online reports use short and edited videos that are taken out of context and fail to show the full picture of how radical protesters' use of extreme violence" necessitated a police response. Police officers, they added, need to "obtain swift and full compliance" of an arrested person to guarantee their safety; force is used as a "last resort ... only to achieve a specific purpose". In one of their routine news conferences the police have justified the indoor use of teargas as a response to violent behavior from protesters, "to stop the protesters' radical behavior as soon as possible". By 8 September 2020, police had written over 100 rebuttal letters to media outlets.

== Effect on public confidence ==
According to polls conducted by the Hong Kong Public Opinion Research Institute, the approval rating shrank to a net approval of 22 percent in mid-2019, due to its handling of the protests. 60 percent of respondents in public surveys were dissatisfied with police handling of incidents since June 2019. Nearly 70 percent of Hong Kong citizens believe the police have acted unprofessionally by making indiscriminate arrests and losing self-control.

An online survey commissioned by the South China Morning Post conducted between 30 November and 2 December found that two-thirds of respondents supported an independent inquiry into police conduct during protests. 73 percent of respondents believed that public trust in the police had declined as a result of their handling of the protests. 53 percent believed police were "too harsh or excessive" with protesters, whereas 23 percent considered it as "adequate" and 24 percent of them believed police were "too lenient or insufficient". Overall, around 26 percent of those surveyed had no trust at all in police – this included 10 percent of pro-establishment voters and 45 percent of those supporting pro-democracy candidates. David Black, managing director of Blackbox Research – author of the survey – said such a high percentage of the population distrusting the police "is [what] we expect to see in authoritarian states."

=== Black police ===
Hong Kong Black Police (or Black Cops, Chinese: 黑警) is a Hong Kong epithet used by citizens to voice condemnation and anger against the police force, where "black" refers to black deeds including excessive use of force, and the association with Organized crime, since in Cantonese, the organized crime or Triads are called as "Black Society".

Following 2011 political protests, the expression now refers to Hong Kong Police Force members who take a political stance and use their power to abuse and suppress those with different political views. Thus, the term mocks the enforcement activities of the police as well as drawing a parallel between their behaviour and that of triad members. The new definition originated during the visit of Li Keqiang after the Hong Kong 818 Incident. Police were accused of using unduly harsh methods to handle dissenting demonstrators. Following the Umbrella Movement and the 16 Mong Kok civil unrest, the use of the term "black police" became more widespread and now used to cover both police who commit crimes, and police are viewed to abuse their authority in dealing with political protesters. The new definition was widely understood by the time of the 2014 Hong Kong protests.

In the 2019 Hong Kong protests, protesters combined "黑" (haak) and "警" (ging) into a single character to suggest that the police worked together with criminal triads to attack them. In October 2019, the National Immigration Agency of Taiwan used the term "Hong Kong black police" (香港黑警) to describe Hong Kong police in a Facebook post, noting that all applications for immigration to Taiwan are scrutinized.

== 2020 IPCC report ==
The IPCC released a thousand-page report on the behaviour of the police force during the civil unrest in which the police was generally exonerated. It concluded that officers generally acted within guidelines but there was "room for improvement". The government launched the report on 15 May against a backdrop of a slogan "The truth about Hong Kong" and images of violent protesters. Chief executive Lam praised the "comprehensive and objective" report, saying she accepted all its recommendations.

The report mirrored police assertions that force was only in reaction to the violent unrest, but said there were "areas for improvement" when officers interacted with protesters. She said priority for implementation were a code of practice for journalists covering protests; more powers to monitor social media and tackle misinformation; reviewing internal police command structures; and identification of police officers with clear numbers. Rights groups and pro democracy parties universally pointed to the lack of independence of the IPCC and the absence of police accountability, and expressed outrage at the report as an absurd and preposterous whitewash. Clifford Stott, who quit the IPCC foreign experts panel, said: "It would seem the release of the IPCC report is part of a wider set of coordinated announcements designed to deliver the new 'truth'".

== Punished individuals ==
- Chris Tang, the Secretary for Security of Hong Kong, with ten other Hong Kong officials were sanctioned by the United States Department of the Treasury under an Executive Order 13936 by President Trump for acts undermining Hong Kong's autonomy.
- John Lee Ka-chiu, the Secretary for Security of Hong Kong, were sanctioned by the United States Department of the Treasury under Executive Order 13936 by President Trump for undermining Hong Kong's autonomy. The European Parliament began the examination in June 2022 whether Lee is set to be sanctioned under the Magnitsky Act.

== See also ==
- San Uk Ling Holding Centre
- 2019 Prince Edward station attack
- Controversies of the Hong Kong Police Force
