= Sunny Lam =

Hong Kong singer-songwriter and YouTuber

- 晴天林
- Born: 1 June 1986 (age 40)
- Occupation: Singer-songwriter

YouTube information
- Channel: 晴天林 SunnyLam
- Years active: 2014–present
- Genres: Music; parody; vlogging; cover
- Subscribers: 311 thousand
- Views: 85.1 million

Chinese name
- Chinese: 晴天林
Transcriptions
Standard Mandarin
- Hanyu Pinyin: Qíng Tiān Lín
Yue: Cantonese
- Jyutping: Cing^{4} Tin^{1} Lam^{4}
- Last updated: 21 June 2026

Sunny Lam (born 1 June 1986; Chinese: 晴天林) is a Hong Kong singer-songwriter and YouTuber. Lam is known for rewriting lyrics to the tune of existing well-known songs as satirical political commentary during the 2014 Hong Kong protests and the 2019–20 Hong Kong protests.

Lam first received attention when he wrote and sang satirical songs during the 2014 Hong Kong protests. He used to work in a marketing position but quit his job in March 2019 to start an independent recording studio. During the 2019–20 Hong Kong protests, Lam satirised the Hong Kong Police Force and supporters of the government by writing and performing additional rewritten songs. In addition to rewriting 50 existing songs by May 2020, he has written original songs about heartbreak, love, wage earners' state of mind, and brown sugar bubble tea. Lam publishes his music videos to YouTube, Facebook, Instagram, and LIHKG.

== Early life and career ==
Lam was born on 1 June 1986. He is introverted and describes himself as having a bit of a Buddha-like mindset. When he was a youth, he learned how to play the piano, make music arrangements, and sing. He participated in singing competitions that he lost. After graduation, Lam sent a sample of his music to record companies and received some replies though ultimately his music was not used. For seven to eight years, while he was working at his full-time marketing job, he sent one or two samples per year of his music to record companies. Before the 2014 Hong Kong protests, he was apolitical and did not think much about societal matters. He wrote social movement songs during the 2014 protests. When he was nearly 30 years old, he resigned from his marketing job in March 2019 to set up an independent recording studio. He planned to find another job if he could not make a living with the independent studio. Lam's intent was to give a platform to amateur musicians who might not have the money to purchase a microphone worth tens of thousands. He would help them with recording and arranging songs to cultivate their interest in music. Lam did not plan to quit his job to become an online singer but transitioned to that career path after the 2019–20 Hong Kong protests began. Owing to the protests and the COVID-19 pandemic in Hong Kong, his recording studio had no business so he transformed it into his workplace to make songs.

Lam started a YouTube channel where he initially uploaded primarily original songs about the topics of love, going to work, and wage earners' state of mind. Those songs received several thousand views. To attract a wider audience, he began uploading his covers of others' songs in which he rewrote those songs' lyrics with a focus on social themes. The covers received tens of thousands of views. Lam's songs have received attention owing to social movements in Hong Kong. This has allowed his music videos to attract hundreds of thousands of views, which Radio Free Asia said is a larger number of views than many traditional popular singers get. He releases a song about every two weeks. Lam used to want to be a mainstream singer-songwriter but no longer has an interest because he said mainstream singers are controlled by record companies and are unable to speak freely without fear of losing work when doing so.

By May 2020, he had created over 50 covers of songs for he rewrote the lyrics. Some of the songs he is able to rewrite within an hour, while others take several days. After writing a song, he spends two to three hours to record it in his studio, one to two hours to film a music video, and two to three hours to do the editing. Most of his YouTube videos do not have advertising revenue since he is singing other people's songs. He did not make much from money from his YouTube uploads which he considered to be a side job. He received income by servicing requests from people to arrange music including one from Apple Daily. Lam began uploading his songs to the music streaming service KKBox and sharing them on Facebook. Lam does YouTube live streams to sing to his fans. He started a Facebook page in 2010. By May 2020, he had almost 100,000 followers on Facebook and YouTube. The am730 columnist Fong Kit said that some people think that Lam is not a real singer since Lam has not released any discs, has not sent promotional recordings to radio stations, has not sung the theme songs for any TV series, and his performances are all on Facebook, YouTube, and LIHKG. Fong noted that Lam's output is higher than many professional singers, compared Lam to well-known singers who have sung rewritten songs, and argued that Lam should be considered a real singer.

In December 2019, Lam was a guest along with three other LIHKG users on the ViuTV talk show "Talker: Helmet Intercom" (Chinese: 又要威 又要戴頭盔). Lam began busking two or three times a month after the 2019 Hong Kong protests began. He chose to perform near housing estates as considered them to be close to the people. He insisted on not going to hotspots like the Tsim Sha Tsui waterfront where there would be tourists. During one of his performances, an elderly man knocked over his piano, leading to the audience's scolding the man, who left. He supports yellow shops and writes songs for them.

In 2020, the lyricist Albert Leung uploaded online a 30-year-old manuscript titled "Children's Song" (Chinese: 兒歌), a song filled with lyrics of children criticising their parents. It was meant for Leslie Cheung to sing but it was never recorded. Leung asked Lam, who had rewritten the lyrics of many of Leung's songs, to perform "Children's Song". Lam did the song's arrangement and used a fairy tale theme to balance out the lyrics' unhappy tone. According to Metro Pop, "the song's melody plus his childish voice represented the innocence that has always been buried in the hearts of adults, longing to be loved in the real world". That Leung selected Lam substantially raised Lam's profile and led to many media reports about him.

Owing to the national security law, Lam said he changed his behaviour. He was fearful of being taken into custody for having written and performed two songs about the 2019 Prince Edward station attack. He did not sing songs on some topics that some people wanted him to sing because he deemed those topics to be too sensitive. When Lam wrote lyrics for a song such as one about the police, he needed to replace some words with codenames and refrain from using profanity. He would avoid using slogans like "Free Hong Kong, revolution now. Netizens who had contributed lyrics to some of his songs informed him they were scared and would no longer contribute. Owing to his creation of songs in support of the protests, Lam has lost numerous opportunities to perform at the mall. Lam has had disagreements with family members over his political activism so tries his best to avoid engaging in political discussion with them. After the national security law was enacted on 30 June 2020, his parents urged him to cease making political songs as they feared he would be arrested for breaching the law. Lam said, "I am scared, but I won't stop doing it" and said that writing songs was a good way to get the public interested in political issues since "Music can repackage news by adding different styles to it such as a sense of humour".

== Songs ==
On 16 May 2019, Lam to YouTube and Facebook uploaded a cover of Fish Leong and Andy Hui's song "It Will Pass" (Chinese: 會過去的) in which he performed the love song with the virtual assistant Siri. After thinking of the song and realising he had no one to perform it with, he saw his iPad and thought of Siri. He spent five to six hours producing the song, first recording Siri's speech and then using arranger software to fix the pitch and tempo. The cover received praise from netizens who liked its originality and hilarity. He wrote songs about relationship breakups and brown sugar bubble tea.

According to the Apple Daily, "under society's watch, Lam tries hard to plant extinct flowers, using black humor to face the chaotic world". He created numerous political pieces beginning in June 2019. When the 2019–20 Hong Kong protests began against the 2019 Hong Kong extradition bill, he wrote the song "Hong Kong Song Medley" (Chinese: 香港之歌) in June 2019 to represent Hong Kong and to encourage the protesters. Lam's satirical songs criticised the alleged police misconduct during the 2019–20 Hong Kong protests including their use of force and indiscriminate arrests. He wrote a song mocking the police's actions during the 2019 Prince Edward station attack. Titled "Police, you have worked hard" (Chinese: 警察，你辛苦了) and based on the Jay Chou song "Dad, I'm Coming Back" (Chinese: 爸，我回來了), the song has the opening lyrics, "On 31 August I returned to my house, watched the news, and saw a group of police officers at Prince Edward station indiscriminately hitting people to vent their anger. Everyone is a Hongkonger. Where is your conscience?" Next TV commented that "the entire song uses a realistic style to accuse the Hong Kong police of improper law enforcement", received a lot of attention, and resonated with netizens. Lam wrote a song titled "Lennon Wall" (Chinese: 連儂牆) inspired by the anger he said he felt after seeing news about an elder's attack on a student who was posting fliers on the "Lennon Wall". The song received substantial attention and popularised Lam. In the past, he occasionally wrote songs when he saw something he wanted to comment on. Once he grew in popularity, he felt an obligation to write the songs to satiate his audience after his viewers started sending him stories to ask him to compose songs about them.

In a song called "National Products City 2019 Recovery Album" about the anti-extradition law, he parodied an Aaron Kwok song. It received a large amount of Internet attention with over 1 million views in three days. He also sang about other protest-related topics like the Prohibition on Face Covering Regulation, tear gas, the 2019 Yuen Long attack, and the San Uk Ling Holding Centre. He produced a music video titled "Investiture of the Communist Courtiers" (Chinese: 共臣榜) that rewrites the lyrics of the TV series Gods of Honour's theme song and had a similar presentation to the satirical television program Headliner. Lam's video discussed the 9 June 2019 protest, the 12 June berating of a Commercial Radio Hong Kong by the Hong Kong police, the 30 June addresses at a pro-police gathering from singers Alan Tam and Kenny Bee, and the storming of the Legislative Council Complex on 1 July.

He created a song titled "Black Coloured Christmas Medley 2019" (Chinese: 黑色聖誕Medley2019) that changed the lyrics of well-known Christmas songs such as "Joy to the World". It had opening lyrics that called the Hong Kong police "Asia's first-rate garbage". Additional songs were "This Group of Black Police Is Garbage" to the tune of "Hark! The Herald Angels Sing", "Chris Tang Is Coming to Town" to the tune of "Santa Claus Is Comin' to Town", "Junius Ho Licked a Goose" to the tune of "Jingle Bells", "Peace, Rationality, and Valiance" to the tune of "O Christmas Tree", and "Cover Station Lights" to the tune of "We Wish You a Merry Christmas". The song concluded with the verse "Glory to Hong Kong".

Lam wrote a song called "Total Prohibition" (Chinese: 全面禁酒) that he uploaded to YouTube on 26 March 2020. It modified the lyrics of Lowell Lo's song "Walk With You" Chinese: 陪著你走 and satirised the Chief Executive of Hong Kong's plan to ban alcohol sales in restaurants at the beginning of the COVID-19 pandemic. The song's copyright holder, EMI Music Publishing Hong Kong, reported it as copyright infringement and YouTube took it down, after which Lam uploaded a new video with him just reading the lyrics as a protest against the removal.

In August 2020, Lam created a song called "Mat Yeung Standup Ten Thousand Medley" (Chinese: 楊明立萬Medley) mocking Mat Yeung after Yeung was detained for suspected drunken driving. Lam rewrote the lyrics of six songs from Eason Chan, Leo Ku, Joey Yung, and Ekin Cheng. He called the songs "Shall We Crash", "Drunk Driving Lose Friends" (Chinese: 醉街損友), "Love and Light (Chinese: 愛與明), "Mat Yeung Distance" (Chinese: 楊明里), "Lonely YeungMing", and "Car Crash" (Chinese: 炒車). The song received over 150,000 views about 12 hours after Lam uploaded it. The singer and actor Joseph Tay praised the song, calling Lam a "musician with true talent who is especially fascinating".
