= Controversies surrounding the Hong Kong Police Force =

The Hong Kong Police Force (HKPF) struggled with corruption among its ranks from the 1940s until the 1970s. It gained the nickname "Asia's Finest" after undergoing reforms in 1979. Since the 2010s, the force has faced allegations of police brutality, sexual assault, excessive use of violence, falsification of evidence, and a lack of professionalism.

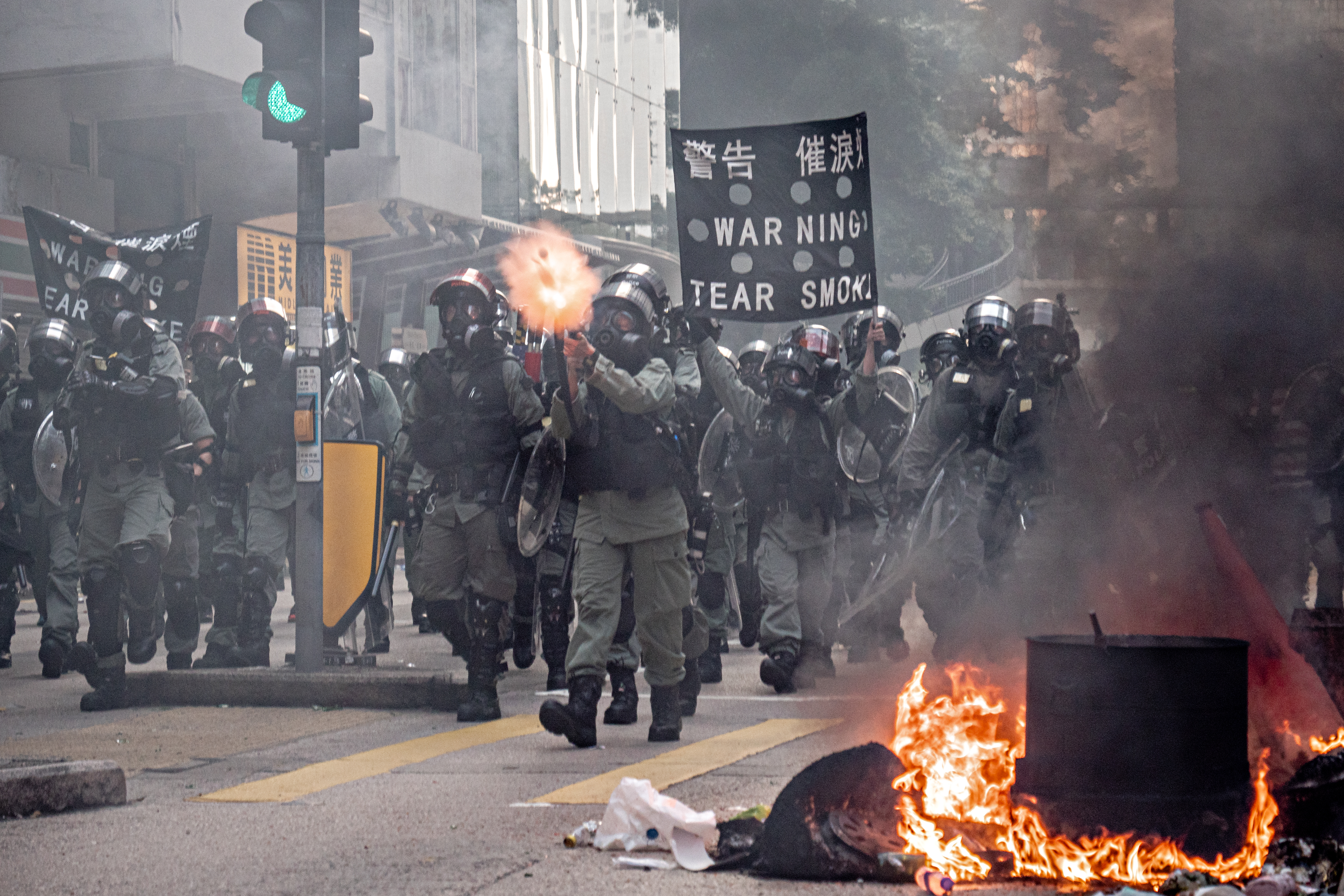
Hong Kong police shooting tear gas at protesters during a demonstration on October 1, 2019.

== 1940–70s: Post-war struggle with corruption ==
After the Second World War ended in 1945, Hong Kong faced an economic slump. Trade became much slower than what it was before the war. Meanwhile, an ongoing civil war in China forced thousands of Chinese refugees to flood the British colony, and later to escape the Cultural Revolution enforced by Mao Zedong and the Chinese Communist Party. Due to a lack of resources to sustain this huge increase in their population, police enforcements were reliant on its staff sergeants (senior non-commissioned officers), who wielded significant power and influence within their districts, often imposing excessive rule over their subordinates.

Corruption began to run rampant and tarnish the reputation of the Hong Kong Police. Officers were paid very little in comparison with other civil servants and with others in society in general. Some officers accepted bribes to turn a blind eye towards syndicated vice, drugs and illegal gambling activities. During the 1950s and 1960s, syndicated criminals paid regular sums of money to the staff sergeants who, in turn, used couriers and book keepers to share their ill-gotten gains amongst the officers and constables of their respective police districts.

This became an increasing concern for the colonial government, but corruption was temporarily overshadowed by the 1967 Hong Kong riots that threatened the stability and very existence of the British colony. In 1969, Queen Elizabeth II honored the Force with the 'Royal' title to recognize its loyalty, dedication and efforts to restore law and order during the 1967 disturbances. Princess Alexandra then became its Commandant General. Thus the Force changed its name to the Royal Hong Kong Police.

Although not confined to the police but tarnishing other government departments and the wider business community as well, police corruption re-emerged as a major concern in the early 1970s. The Commissioner of Police, Charles Sutcliffe, ordered investigations to break the culture of corruption and this caused over forty Chinese officers to flee Hong Kong with more than HK$80 million cash (about HK$2 million each). Moreover, in 1973, a highly decorated officer, Chief Superintendent Peter Godber, became embroiled in a corruption scandal when Sutcliffe found him to have amassed HK$4.3 million in assets. Godber fled the colony after learning of his intended arrest, prompting a public outcry. These events precipitated the formation of the Independent Commission Against Corruption (ICAC) in 1974, which the government gave wide-ranging powers to investigate and bring to justice corrupt elements in Hong Kong society. The Hong Kong Police's official history cited poor pay as one of the primary factors that motivated officers to engage in corruption. Investigators mounted a series of raids on police stations throughout the colony, sometimes bringing many officers to ICAC offices for questioning. Police discontent with this situation peaked in 1977 and the government offered an amnesty to all serving officers after junior police officers demonstrated at the Police Headquarters in Wanchai and the ICAC offices near Admiralty.

== 1979–2010: Re-organization and "Asia's Finest" ==
Following the amnesty, the police force re-organized itself, introducing new layers of management, police procedures and supervisory accountability to deter and detect corrupt elements within its ranks. The government also greatly improved police remuneration and overhauled the terms and conditions of their service—arguably removing the incentive for corruption.

Resulting from the reforms of 1979 and the early 1980s, the Royal Hong Kong Police regained its good name and reputation and began marketing itself as "Asia's Finest". It developed a strong track record for fighting crime, and enjoyed the reputation of being one of the most professional, efficient, honest and impartial police forces in the Asia Pacific region. The force enjoyed the esteem and confidence of the public it served, as demonstrated by the University of Hong Kong opinion polls between 1997 and 2007. Its popularity peaked in 2007 with a net approval rating of 79 percentage points.

== 2010s–present ==
=== Sexual assault allegations ===
Since 2014, there have been reports of police officers involved in sexual assaults on female victims. In one high-profile case involving an officer with six years' service molesting a female within Police Headquarters toilet, the officer was convicted of indecent assault and abuse of power. There had been an incident in 2008, when a woman was raped inside Mong Kok police station by a policeman.

In 2021, a former policeman was sentenced to five-year imprisonment on Tuesday after a sentence review, in which he originally got 46 months in jail for indecently assaulting six underage girls. He pleaded guilty to 8 counts of indecent assault and unlawful sexual intercourse committed between 2017 and 2018 when he was still in the force. Originally released on bail, he was arrested again after committing another crime resulting in the present sentence.

=== 2014 Umbrella Movement ===
==== Police brutality allegations ====
Police were criticized for violently attacking protesters in October 2014, as well as for allegedly colluding with triads and thugs against peaceful protesters.

Seven officers were convicted and sentenced to two years in prison in early 2017, after a video tape surfaced of them beating a handcuffed protester in police custody on 15 October 2014, sparking outrage and accusations of police brutality. The commissioner of police, pro-Beijing politicians, and thousands of members of the police unions publicly supported the convicted officers.

As a result of Andy Tsang's unpopular decisions and comments as Chief of Police, critics nicknamed him "Vulture". The approval rating of the police declined from mid-2012 to 2015 with the record low net approval of 21 percentage points set in early 2015.

According to the Wall Street Journal, Tsang was responsible for politicization of the police during his tenure and aligning policing objectives with the state. Police failure to respond to assaults against certain groups, heavy-handed treatment of protesters during the "Umbrella Revolution", deployment of riot police and 87 instances of tear gas use against unarmed students, caused disquiet among the public and some senior police staffers. The police were seen to have become a political tool in support of a governance system that is overseeing the replacement of rule of law with "rule by law" as defined by the CCP. Fung Wai-wah, president of the Professional Teachers' Union, commented that "the police [during the Umbrella Revolution] have made themselves enemy of the people [literally overnight]".

==== Failure to prosecute a police superintendent for assault ====
The Hong Kong Police came under fire for failing to charge police superintendent Franklin Chu King-wai, now retired, who was filmed hitting civilians with a police baton when uniformed officers were directing a line of passers-by to move along after a protest in Mong Kok on 26 November 2014. The day before Chu was due to retire in July 2015, the Independent Police Complaints Council (IPCC) established by a majority decision that a complaint against Chu was justified. The internal Complaints Against Police Office (CAPO) disagreed and sought legal advice from the Department of Justice. Chu was eventually charged, convicted and sentenced to a term of imprisonment.

==== Misuse of care and protection orders allegations ====
In December 2014, the police caused concern when they applied for Care and Protection Orders (CPO) for two youths, one of whom was arrested during the protests. Police arrested one 14-year-old male for contempt of court during the clearance of Mong Kok and applied for a CPO. The CPO was cancelled four weeks later when the Department of Justice decided that they would not prosecute.

In a second case, a 14-year-old female who drew a chalk flower onto the Lennon Wall on 23 December 2014 was arrested on suspicion of criminal damage, detained by police for 17 hours, and then held against her will in a children's home for 20 days, but was never charged with any crime. A magistrate decided in favor of a CPO pursuant to a police application, deeming it "safer." The incident created uproar as she was taken away from her hearing-impaired father, and was unable to go to school. On 19 January, another magistrate rescinded the protection order for "Chalk Girl" (粉筆少女) after reviewing a report from a social worker. The handling of the situation by the police raised concerns, as there was no explanation as to why the police failed to locate and consult a social worker before applying for the order in accordance with proper procedures. The controversy gained international attention, and The Guardian produced a short documentary film, titled "The Infamous Chalk Girl" which was released in 2017. Use of the CPO device against minors involved in the Umbrella Movement was seen as "white terror" to deter young people from protesting and exercising free speech.

==== Framing allegations ====
In May 2015, a man was arrested, detained from 2 to 4 May for in excess of 48 hours and wrongfully accused of murder. The man was autistic, and the police failure to handle such a case sparked controversy. According to the police, the suspect made a written confession of an assault that contradicted severely with statements obtained whilst interviewed with family members. A nursing home later offered the suspect an alibi, corroborated with video evidence, that the man could not have been at the alleged crime scene. Civil rights activists condemned the incident which traumatized a vulnerable individual, and criticized the police procedures including not proposing legal representation, lengthy detention, an methods for obtaining a bogus confession. The police chief expressed "regret" but refused to make an apology. Also in May 2015, police procedures for conducting identity parades attracted controversy when suspects in an assault case on television reporters were allowed to wear shower caps and face masks during an identity parade, ostensibly to cover distinctive features, leading to the police abandoning the case due to insufficient evidence. The police stance was confirmed by the new Chief Commissioner.

==== Revisionism allegations ====
In mid-September 2015, media reported that the police had made material deletions from its website concerning "police history", in particular, the political cause and the identity of the groups responsible for the 1967 riots. Mention of communists and Maoists were expunged: for example, "Bombs were made in classrooms of left-wing schools and planted indiscriminately on the streets" became "Bombs were planted indiscriminately on the streets"; the fragment "waving aloft the Little Red Book and shouting slogans" disappeared, and an entire sentence criticizing the hypocrisy of wealthy pro-China businessmen, the so-called "red fat cats" was deleted. The editing gave rise to criticisms that it was being sanitized, to make it appear that the British colonial government, rather than leftists, were responsible. Stephen Lo, the new Commissioner of Police, said the content change of the official website was to simplify it for easier reading; Lo denied that there were any political motives, but his denials left critics unconvinced.

In October 2015 the Police Public Relations Bureau launched a Facebook page in a bid to improve its public image. The page was immediately inundated with tens of thousands of critical comments, many asking why the seven officers who beat the handcuffed protester a year earlier had not been arrested. In response, the police held a press conference and warned of "criminal consequences" for online behavior.

==== Stolen bail money allegations ====
A police sergeant at the Wan Chai Police Station allegedly absconded on 1 May 2016 with HK$1.07 million (US$140,000) in bail funds. A man remanded on bail who reported to the station on 25 May 2016 claimed that an officer told him that the police could not be held liable for the missing money, and made him sign a waiver of claims in relation to the bail money he had posted previously. Although police public relations quickly apologized for the "misunderstanding" that had occurred at the Wan Chai station, media criticized top management for being equivocal and evasive about the accountability of the station and also about whether the police officers responsible for the waiver response would be disciplined.

=== 2019–20 Hong Kong protests ===
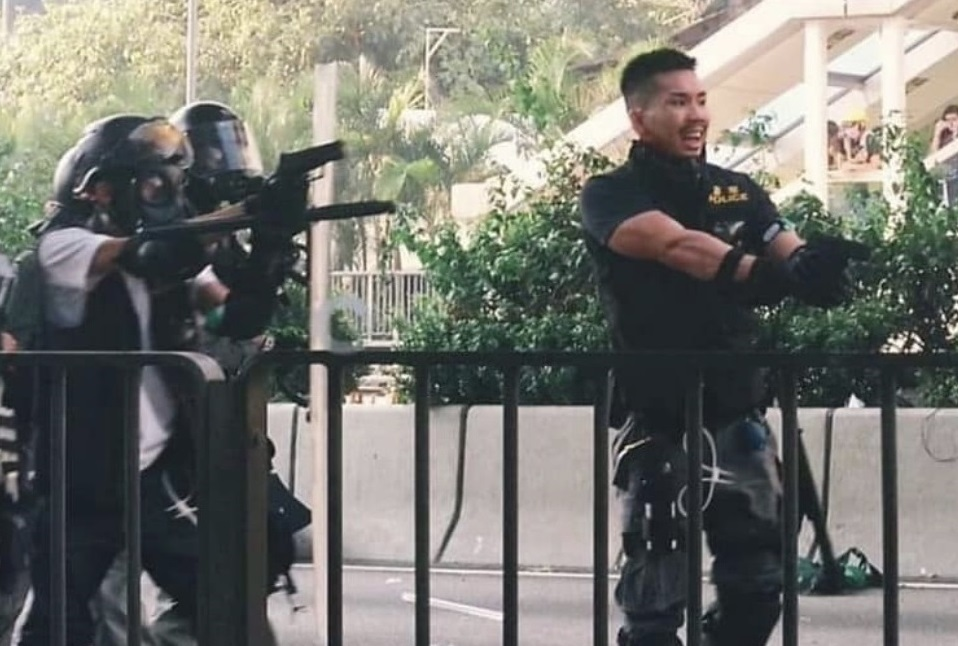
An officer holding a revolver in Wong Tai Sin

In the 2019–20 Hong Kong protests, police were criticized for using excessive force. On 12 June, they had fired 150 tear gas rounds, 20 beanbag shots, several rubber bullets and smoke bombs on protesters outside the Legislative Council complex. The New York Times released a video essay showing tear gas was deployed as an "offensive weapon" and that in several cases, unarmed protesters were beaten and dragged by police commanders. Commissioner of Police Stephen Lo dismissed those complaints, stating that 22 officers were hurt during the protest and suitable force had been used.

On 21 June 2019, Amnesty International examined various video footage and concluded that the Hong Kong police had used excessive force in 14 incidents. They published a report, documenting the use of excessive force, and stated that there were numerous violations of international law regarding use of force by Hong Kong police officers against unarmed civilians.

On 23 June 2019, a press conference was jointly held by representatives from the Medical, Health Services, and Legal sectors. 82 election committees from the Medical, Health Services, and Legal function constituencies signed a joint proclamation stating that the police had arrested five people seeking public hospital treatment and also verbally threatened some nurses to try to obtain patient details. The signatories urged the police to stop interfering with hospital treatment and to respect patient confidentiality.

Throughout the period, there are numerous cases where the police officers on duty did not show their warrant cards despite it being a legal requirement for them to do so. There are also numerous documented cases where police officers either refused to show the warrant card when requested by the press or citizens, or simply ignored the requests. None of the members of the Special Tactical Squad deployed on 12 June showed the police ID number as it was claimed by the Secretary for Security John Lee that the uniform design did not allow the ID number be displayed. The police refused to provide the ID number for the squad as "it would hinder the investigation of crimes and affect public safety". This prevented the general public from complaining about the police officers and raised controversies. A police spokesperson stated that police officers were not required to wear the warrant card all the time; on the other hand, the official police television programme "Police Report", stated the opposite.

On 30 June 2019, a police-support campaign were held in Tamar Park. There were video recordings showing respectively, (1) a legislative council member being assaulted by a small group of police supporters, an anti-extradition bill protester being pushed to the ground and beaten by a group of police supporters, the police was present and did not arrest anyone on the spot. There was a video allegedly showing that after a police supporter assaulted a protester, the person was released immediately without having had their details taken down, whilst a detained protester held for 15 minutes was not allowed to leave unless the protester drop the charge.

On 8 July 2019, a man claimed that a police officer declared that the police do not need to show the warrant card while performing their duties and Tan Wenhao, a member of the Civic Party in the Legislative Council, claimed that journalists were knocked down by an advancing police riot shield wall. Following these incidents, lawmaker Lam Cheuk-ting requested an independent investigation into police conduct, called for a review of video that may show the use of excessive force, and stated that failure to have warrant cards visibly displayed may be a violation of the law. Reporters have captured videos which show people who appear to be protestors beating private citizens and vandalizing cars. Some protestors are reportedly associated with a radical group Valiant Frontier which has been reported to have used violence in the past. A report on 17 August 2019, citing a recent poll, stated that most residents would not denounce the group despite not agreeing with their method.

By September 2019, the self-proclaimed Citizens’ Press Conference announced that public satisfaction with the police had declined to a record .02 percent on a scale of zero to 10 in their online poll, with roughly 120,000 of the poll respondents – or 87 percent – giving the police force a rating of zero. The ratings represented the lowest level since 1997 and lower than that of the PLA Hong Kong Garrison. Soon after the Extradition Bill protests, Amnesty International published a report on the unlawful use of force by the Hong Kong Police Force, including the dangerous use of rubber bullets, officers beating protesters who did not resist, aggressive tactics used by police to obstruct journalists on site and the misuse of tear gas.

==== Yuen Long attack ====
On 21 July 2019, a mob of over 100 armed men dressed in white indiscriminately attacked civilians on the streets and passengers in the Yuen Long MTR station. An MTR spokesman said workers at the station saw disputes taking place at about 10:45 pm and immediately contacted police within two minutes. However, the police officers only arrived at around 11:15 pm, when the mob was gone, despite receiving many other citizens' call to 999 for help. Residents also reported being ignored and treated rudely by 999 responders, who claimed they "should stay at home if they are afraid". Upon arrival, police were surrounded by dozens of angry residents and protesters who accused police of deliberately retreating after being called to the scene for the first assault.

==== Prince Edward station attack ====
Hong Kong police storm Prince Edward station and attack civilians on 31 August 2019

The Prince Edward station attack on 31 August 2019, also known as the 831 incident or Prince Edward terrorist attack, refers to an indiscriminate attack towards passengers by the Hong Kong police after a protest at the night on 31 August 2019 for the 2019–20 Hong Kong protests in the Prince Edward station, Mong Kok.

===== Allegations against police in the Reclaim protests =====
On 6 July 2019, some activists tried to remove groups of singers and viewers from the park. The police was accused of selective enforcement. A viewer who assaulted an activist were protected by the police and sent to a taxi, without a proper investigation of the confrontation. A group of police held an activist on the ground, pulled off his surgical mask, took photos of his face and recorded his ID without reason. Around 50 police officers surround a toilet for hours, in the process refusing to let a woman suffering a chronic illness to use the toilet because one of the singers was in it.

On 13 July 2019, in the Reclaim Sheung Shui protest, police was accused of chasing an innocent man who then jumped off a bridge in panic, there was a number of allegations of excessive force and abuse of power, including police refusing to show their ID number.

On 14 July 2019, in the Reclaim Sha Tin protest, police blocked multiple exit routes, leaving a single route for protesters to go in a Shopping mall in Sha Tin. The police then blocked the MTR station, trapping protesters and bystanders in the Shopping Mall. Police then stormed the shopping mall and assaulted the citizens inside, protesters and bystanders alike. It is claimed that police intentionally applied excessive force that would cause permanently injuries to protesters, including bending the wrist of an unconscious detainee by 180-degree, and poking the eyeball of a protester.

==== Property controversy ====
In April to May 2020, senior members of the police were implicated in illegal housing controversies. A report by Apple Daily alleged Assistant Commissioner Rupert Dover to have illegally occupied and extended his house. It was also reported by Ming Pao that another house was operated illegally as a guesthouse by Dover. Apple Daily also accused police chief Chris Tang of turning a blind eye to illegal structures on an apartment he previously rented. The police denied any wrongdoing by Tang. Chief Superintendent David John Jordan and Superintendent Vasco Gareth Llewellyn Williams have also been accused of illegal extensions on their respective properties.

Police Commissioner Chris Tang has accused Apple Daily's attacks on senior officers of being retaliation for the 18 April arrest of the paper's founder, Jimmy Lai.

=== 2019–2020 coronavirus outbreak ===
==== Stockpiling controversy ====
During the coronavirus outbreak in 2020, the police force was accused for stockpiling protective gear while leaving other government departments and medical workers short of masks. Legislator Kwok Ka-ki stated that the police stockpiled around 640,000 surgical masks and 13,000 N95 respirators, and intended to acquire 64,000 more face coverings in the next two months. Police defended themselves, stating that Kwok has made "unfounded allegations".

RTHK news satire show Headliner also satirized the controversy in a sketch performed by Wong He where he was dressed as a police officer. Police force issued an official complaint, stating that they express "extreme regret" and argued that the supply is needed for a large workforce.

==== Dinner with celebrities ====
In February 2020, a leaked video showed that Chris Tang, the Police Commissioner and other senior officers at a private dinner with Jackie Chan, Eric Tsang and Alan Tam. They were without face masks despite the government's appeal to limit social interactions amid the coronavirus outbreak. Legislators criticized the police for defying government recommendations and making inappropriate flattering remarks.

=== Sundry incidents ===
==== November 2012 ====
In November 2012, taxi driver Chan Fai-wong was arrested at the Western Harbour Crossing following a fare dispute with a passenger. Chan refused to get into a police van, and was subsequently put in a chokehold by police and dragged by his neck into the van. He suffered a cervical vertebra dislocation and died a month later from complications resulting from the injury. While most of the involved officers argued they had used legal force, a coroner's court inquest ruled in 2018 that Chan had been killed unlawfully by the police.

==== May 2020 ====
Two off-duty policemen were arrested during a raid of an illegal gambling den. The pair were suspended. Two officers caught up in a sting operation involving crystal methamphetamine with a street value of HK$14 million ($2 million) were suspected of having sourced the narcotics from a 300 kg consignment seized the previous month; the charge sheet of the arrested strangely omitted narcotics type, quantity, and the defendants' occupation. In the same month, riot squad officers were filmed entering a convenience store while on duty, made off with a bottle of water without paying while calling out loudly "Coming back". After the footage was published on social media, the public relations section of the HKPF said they subsequently visited the store and paid for the water.

=== Epoch Times ===
From 2006 to 2021, 6 attacks against The Epoch Times happened in Hong Kong; none of the 6 attacks led to prosecutions.

=== Oriental Daily ===
In February 2023, the police sent a letter to Oriental Daily, criticizing a video commentary on the police force's performance. The police said the newspaper had acted in an "unprofessional, irresponsible, and biased criticism made in a mocking manner."

=== Tear gas debris ===
Following a training exercise, police left behind hundreds of spent tear gas canisters on one of the Soko Islands, sometime between November 2022 and February 2023.

=== Abby Choi ===
In February 2023, a former officer was arrested, on being suspected of masterminding the murder of Abby Choi in Lung Mei Tsuen.

== See also ==
- Separation of powers in Hong Kong
