= Separation of powers in Hong Kong =

Aspect of law

The concept of separation of powers has been considered and disputed in Hong Kong and its various forms of government. Prior to the Handover of Hong Kong in 1997, the government of British Hong Kong did not have a Western-style separation of powers. The post-handover Hong Kong Basic Law does not explicitly prescribe a separation of powers, but allocates power to the Executive Council, Legislative Council, and Judiciary. Since the 1997 handover, whether the separation of powers principle exists within the Hong Kong political system has been disputed among the Hong Kong SAR Government, central Chinese Government, and public media.

== History ==
=== British colonial era ===
In British Hong Kong, the political system did not include a Western-style separation of powers. The colonial-era judiciary was independent from the rest of the government, but legislators were appointed by the governor until 1985 (with the introduction of functional constituencies) and senior government officials were given seats in the Legislative Council until 1995.

In 1986, a report to the Hong Kong Basic Law Drafting Committee from its political subgroup recommended a government model involving separation of powers. The proposal was rejected in 1987 by Chinese leader Deng Xiaoping who said that "the Hong Kong system of government should not be completely Westernised" and that copying the "separation of three powers" would be inappropriate, after which the committee stopped using the term.

=== Post-1997 handover ===
After the 1997 Handover of Hong Kong, the Hong Kong Basic Law encoded mainland China's decision to allocate power to the executive, judiciary, and legislative branches of government, with an elected legislature not controlled by the executive authorities. However, the Basic Law does not explicitly specify a "separation of powers".

Since 1997, Hong Kong courts have frequently conceptualised separation of powers as a feature of the law in Hong Kong, in contrast to officials from mainland China who have emphasised the lack of explicit separation of powers and highlighted the powers of the Chief Executive and power of the Standing Committee of the National People's Congress of China (NPCSC).

In September 2015, Zhang Xiaoming, then-director of the Hong Kong and Macau Affairs Office of China said that "Hong Kong does not practise the separation of powers system" and that the Chief Executive of Hong Kong had a special legal status that was "transcendent" of the executive, legislature, and judiciary. Zhang, in addition to other mainland Chinese academics and officials, described the fundamental principle of designing the Hong Kong political system as being an "executive-led system".

==== 2020 textbook controversy ====
On 31 August 2020, at a press conference to announce the resumption of classes in all schools in Hong Kong next month, the then-Secretary for Education Bureau, Kevin Yeung, responded to a Liberal education textbook publisher's proposal to delete the content of the textbook on the separation of powers in Hong Kong after the Government's consultation, saying that there was no system of separation of powers in Hong Kong before and after the handover of sovereignty, and this point needed to be stated in textbooks. The following day, the Chief Executive, Carrie Lam, publicly stated at a press conference that she fully supported Kevin Yeung's view that there was no separation of powers. She stressed that the executive authorities, the legislature and the judiciary should co-ordinate with each other and exercise checks and balances, but all of them should be accountable to the Central Authorities through the Chief Executive. She described the relationship between the three powers in Hong Kong as one in which each has its own role to play, and hoped that they could complement each other.

The Hong Kong Bar Association criticised Lam's statements, saying that independent operations of the three branches of government would guard against abuse. On 7 September 2020, the Hong Kong and Macau Affairs Office and Hong Kong Liaison Office both issued statements supporting the Education Bureau's decision to remove remarks about separation of powers from teaching materials while emphasizing that Hong Kong had an executive-led governance system with checks and balances between the executive, legislative, and judiciary branches. Constitutional law scholar Johannes Chan described the distinction drawn by Lam and mainland China as a semantic issue, but said that the debate represented a power struggle against alternative interpretations of the Basic Law of Hong Kong for the central Chinese government beyond semantics.

== Government structure ==
=== Executive branch ===
The Chief Executive of Hong Kong (CE) is the head of the Hong Kong Special Administrative Region and is elected by a 1200-member Election Committee drawn mostly from the voters in the functional constituencies but also from religious organisations and municipal and central government bodies. The CE is legally appointed by Premier, head of the Central People's Government of China. The Executive Council, the top policy organ of the executive government that advises on policy matters, is entirely appointed by the Chief Executive.

=== Legislative branch ===
In accordance with Article 26 of the Basic Law of the Hong Kong Special Administrative Region, permanent residents of Hong Kong are eligible to vote in direct elections for the 35 seats representing geographical constituencies and 35 seats from functional constituencies in the 70-seat, unicameral Legislative Council (LegCo).

Within functional constituencies, 5 seats attribute to District Council (Second) which virtually regards the entire city as a single electoral constituency. The franchise for the other 30 seats is limited to about 230,000 voters in the other functional constituencies (mainly composed of business and professional sectors).

=== Judicial branch ===
The Judiciary consists of a series of courts, of which the court of final adjudication is the Court of Final Appeal. However, the Basic Law of Hong Kong stipulates that rulings of the Court of Final Appeal are subject to the final interpretation by the Standing Committee of the National People's Congress (NPCSC) of China.

== Dispute ==
Whether separation of powers exists within the Hong Kong political system and the principle's scope have been disputed since the Handover of Hong Kong and the activation of the Basic Law of Hong Kong in 1997, and even during the drafting process of the Basic Law in the 1980s. Scholars and legal professionals from Hong Kong tend to argue that the Hong Kong government has clear separation of powers while scholars and officials from mainland China insist that it is an executive-led government with judiciary independence as well as subordination to the Central Government and power centred around the Chief Executive (CE).

Since the 1997 handover, Hong Kong courts under the authorisation of the Standing Committee of the National People's Congress (NPCSC) of China have frequently conceptualised separation of powers as a feature of the law in Hong Kong, using it to guard against executive and legislative encroachment against judicial independence and to justify non-interference in matters pertaining to the executive and legislative branches. Due to the unique position of the NPCSC above the highest Hong Kong court and the ability of the Chief Executive to trigger interpretations of the Basic Law from the NPCSC, the separation of powers in Hong Kong is idiosyncratic and resembles weak judicial review.

== Documents ==
=== Official documents of the HKSAR Government ===
- The Basic Law of Hong Kong does not explicitly specify a "separation of powers" but does allocate powers to the executive, legislative, and judiciary branches of Hong Kong.
- In the official press kit distributed to Chinese and foreign reporters at the 1997 Hong Kong handover ceremony, the first sentence of the chapter on "Government System" recorded that "Hong Kong's political system is based on the principle of 'separation of powers' and has an executive-led government.
- The Education Bureau's website has accessed the note "The Basic Law, the Rule of Law and Hong Kong's Strengths" written by Justice Patrick Chan in 2011. In the chapter on "The Rule of Law as a System", "Separation of Powers" is listed, explaining that the functions of the government can be carried out by the legislature, the executive and the judiciary, and that the establishment of authorities can avoid concentration of power and abuse of power. The document was deleted in 2020, but Stand News wrote that traces of blocked hyperlinks and related content remained on the Internet.

=== Judicial verdicts ===
Hong Kong Internet-based media Stand News reported that by 2020, the separation of powers have been explicitly mentioned more than 100 times in the verdicts of Hong Kong judges. It also reported that Chief Justice of the Court of Final Appeal, Andrew Cheung, also explicitly recorded the separation of powers system in Hong Kong in a 2008 judgement.

=== Textbooks ===
The doctrine of separation of powers appeared in textbooks in Hong Kong, including an Economic and public affairs textbook in 2013.

== See also ==
- Censorship
  - Censorship in Hong Kong
  - Censorship in China
- Controversies of the Hong Kong Police Force
