= San Uk Ling Holding Centre =

Hong Kong detention centre

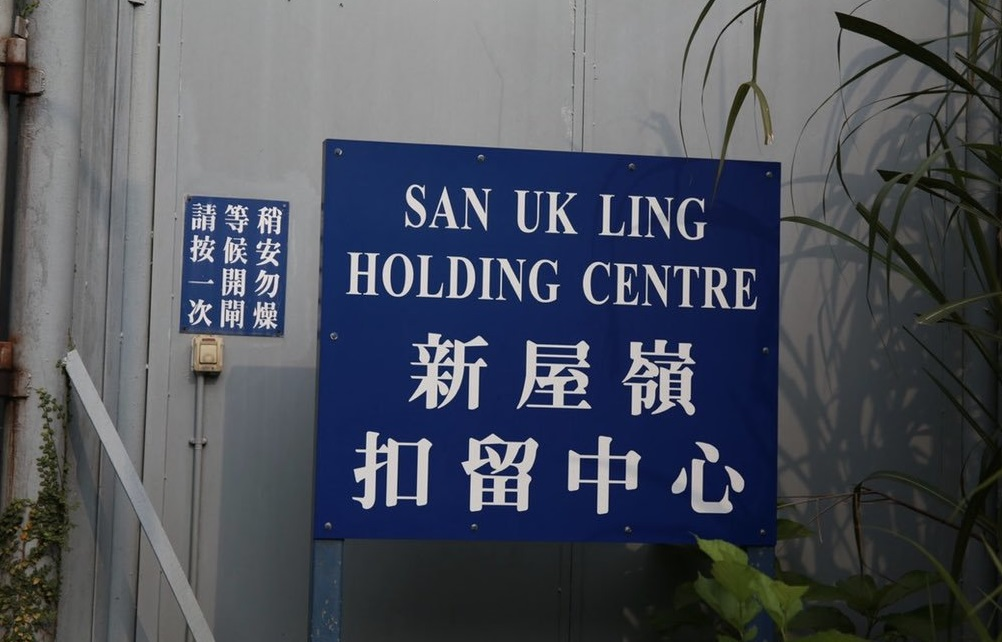
- Sign at entrance

- Location within Hong Kong
- Location: Man Kam To, New Territories; 22.528444°N 114.131612°E
- Status: Operational
- Capacity: 200 (approx.)
- Opened: July 1979; 46 years ago
- Managed by: Hong Kong Police Force and Immigration Department

San Uk Ling Holding Centre (Chinese: 新屋嶺扣留中心) is a detention centre in Man Kam To, Hong Kong. Located a few hundred metres away from the Man Kam To Control Point, a boundary crossing facility between Hong Kong and mainland China, the centre opened in July 1979 to house illegal immigrants prior to their repatriation.

Infamous for the remoteness, San Uk Ling was used to detain protesters during the 2019 protests. Controversial allegations of mistreatment and sexual violence in the detention facility had emerged, which were vehemently denied by the police.

== History ==
=== Establishment and early years ===
The San Uk Ling holding centre was constructed by the British colonial government in 1979 as an immigration detention facility. The increasing number of illegal immigrants attempting to sneak into Hong Kong from China had overburdened an existing detention facility at Ta Kwu Ling, which could only accommodate 60 people. The San Uk Ling facility, with a capacity of around 600, was built to hold illegal immigrants prior to their repatriation across the Chinese border, about a kilometre to the north.

The holding centre formally opened in July 1979. Due to the huge increase in illegal immigration that year, the Hong Kong Auxiliary Police Force was mobilised, with several platoons posted to the San Uk Ling facility.

It is located immediately south of Man Kam To Control Point, a border crossing which was, until 1985, the only vehicular road link between Hong Kong and China. Under then government's policy, illegal immigrants were to be sent back to China within 24 hours of capture. Each day, those held at San Uk Ling were taken to the Man Kam To border crossing and handed over at 12:30 pm. Given the short duration that people were detained there, accommodation at San Uk Ling was rudimentary, with units divided only by steel fencing. By mid-1986, illegal immigration had declined, and the facility only held around 40 people on a daily basis.

In late 1989 and early 1990, San Uk Ling Holding Centre was converted into a special facility designed to house Vietnamese refugees who were awaiting forced repatriation following their classification as non-refugees. Security was strengthened at this time, and the accommodation was improved. However, it is unclear if the facility was ever used for this purpose.

The holding centre's five residential huts were reportedly fitted with air conditioners in April 1991. In early 1992, the maximum capacity of the facility was said to be 689.

Following the Tiananmen Square massacre of 4 June 1989, San Uk Ling was used as a temporary shelter for movement leaders who were transported to Hong Kong during Operation Yellowbird. During the WTO Ministerial Conference in 2005, arrested militant Korean farmers were sent to San Uk Ling.

As the Frontier Closed Area reduced in recent years, the detention centre is no longer located within the closed area.

=== 2019 protests ===
During the 2019–2020 Hong Kong protests, some arrested protestors were sent to San Uk Ling as an overspill detention facility after 5 August 2019. On 11 August 2019 alone, 54 people who were arrested in Causeway Bay and Tsim Sha Tsui were sent there. While Yuen Long, Tuen Mun, Pat Heung, and Sheung Shui police stations being located closer to downtown Hong Kong and having some detainee capacity, San Uk Ling is more remote, making it difficult for the arrestees to contact outsiders. There are no closed-circuit televisions in the entrance and exit passages, meeting rooms and search rooms of San Uk Ling. In response to the public's concern, the Police explained that since many police stations that could normally be used as detaining centre were under attack or too close to protest scenes, San Uk Ling was found to be "most suitable" for detaining arrestees with its capacity, high level of security, distance from areas of disturbance, and the low risk of attack by protesters.

== Alleged tortures ==
In September 2019, 31 people detained in San Uk Ling were sent to North District Hospital, among whom six were seriously injured with bone fractures. Media reported one was seriously assaulted with his arm connected to his torso only through skin, while others had their teeth beaten out, and some suffered intracerebral haemorrhages. Police were also accused of delaying the hospitalisation of the injured and depriving them of necessary medication. Some protesters taken to San Uk Ling alleged the officers of sexual assault. Six justices of the peace who wanted to investigate the allegations of mistreatment were denied of visiting San Uk Ling. In response to lawmaker Tanya Chan’s enquires, John Lee, then Secretary for Security and later the Chief Executive, claimed amongst the 30 arrestees in San Uk Ling that required medical treatment, no one reported injury during the detention. He added 10 arrestees reported injuries upon arrival at the centre and the rest only reported ill for treatment. Regarding the allegation of sexual assault, Lee said no such complaint against police received.

The Police Public Relations Branch said San Uk Ling had been nothing more than a standard detention facility in line with police regulations, and rebutted all allegations as "unnamed", "unverified" and "untrue". The police team said the centre had not been used to hold protestors since 2 September, and any further arrested be sent to police stations across the city in case of mass arrests. The spokesman added that the decision "has nothing to do with the groundless allegations of police of misconduct", and that it was a necessary step "to avoid any further public speculation and unnecessary remarks" as to its continued use.

=== Official investigation ===
The city's police watchdog, Independent Police Complaints Council (IPCC), investigated the case in San Uk Ling and subsequently published the result. The IPCC confirmed that as at 29 February 2020, no complaint was made by any arrestee concerning alleged assault in San Uk Ling. However, the IPCC concluded "with its limitations in set-up and equipment, [the centre] was not suitable for use as a temporary holding area on that occasion." The supervisory body recommended future detention facilities for mass arrests must be designed to match the standards now available in police arrangements and also review and design a policy of requirements or factors for consideration in identifying a venue to be designated and activated as holding facilities for mass arrests.

=== Trial of fabricated claims ===
Poon Yung-wai, under the pseudonym "Kim Jong-un", published four posts in a Facebook group with more than 50,000 members in late September 2019, claiming to have learned about alleged sexual assaults in San Uk Ling from a police source. In the posts he said female protesters had been molested and raped after they were "injected with tranquilizer" by "corrupted cops". He further claimed that after "many" of those committed suicide, the officers would "take their bodies to other places and throw them from above." Another post by Poon said: "It is said that some male protesters were forced to watch female ones being raped, before the men were hit to death." Police arrested Poon on 16 October and subsequent searches confirmed that the accused had logged onto Facebook under the pseudonym Kim Jong-un with the devices.

After a public trial, the court found Poon guilty for inciting unlawful assembly and Poon has been jailed for 13 months. Chief Judge of the High Court Jeremy Poon, said the offence warranted a jail sentence even for first-time offenders because it was very serious, considering it involved a targeted attack on law enforcement and a risk of breaching public order.

== Closure as detention centre ==
On 26 September 2019, the Chief Executive announced that the Police would stop using San Uk Ling detaining facilities to detain the arrestees. The Police confirmed the news on the next day. IPCC examined San Uk Ling on 8 October and discussed with the Hong Kong Police representatives on the procedures for escorting and handling of the arrested persons. After fully adopting the advice by the IPCC in its report, the Police installed surveillance cameras at the centre, added a fixed-line telephone, and upgraded its broadband service for better security and external communications. Police also announced forming a task force to review facilities at San Uk Ling during its open visit by local lawmakers and press in May 2020.

== Operation ==
Unlike other prisons in Hong Kong, which are run by the Correctional Services Department, San Uk Ling is jointly operated by the Hong Kong Police Force and Immigration Department. As of 2019, the facility continues to be used to hold captured illegal immigrants prior to their repatriation.

The facility falls under the purview of the Ta Kwu Ling Divisional Police Station. According to a 2019 statement by the Secretary for Security, San Uk Ling contains four cell blocks containing a total of 16 detention cells, which can collectively accommodate around 200 prisoners in total. The cells have stone beds, lighting, air conditioning, and toilets. The complex also has interview rooms.

== See also ==
- Controversies of the Hong Kong Police Force
- Police misconduct allegations during the 2019–2020 Hong Kong protests
- 2019 November Shooting Incident in Sai Wai Ho
