= Anthony Neoh =

Anthony Neoh KC SC JP
- 梁定邦

Chairman of the Independent Police Complaints Council
- In office 1 June 2018 – 31 May 2021
- Preceded by: Larry Kwok
- Succeeded by: Priscilla Wong

Chairman of the Securities and Futures Commission
- In office 1995–1998
- Preceded by: Robert William Nottle
- Succeeded by: Andrew Sheng

Personal details
- Born: 9 November 1946 (age 79) British Hong Kong
- Education: University of London (LLB)

Anthony Francis Neoh KC SC JP (Chinese: 梁定邦, born 9 November 1946) is a Hong Kong barrister, academic and former civil servant who served as chairman of the Independent Police Complaints Council from 2018 to 2021.

== Early life and civil service career ==
Neoh was born in British Hong Kong in 1946 to a family with ancestral roots in Fuzhou. After completing secondary school, Neoh received offers to study computer science at overseas universities, but could not afford the tuition and had to turn them down. He began working as a secondary school teacher in 1964 to make ends meet before joining the civil service in 1966 as an executive officer at the age of 19, becoming one of the few executive officers not to have a university degree.

== Legal career ==
Neoh is Chief Adviser to the China Securities Regulatory Commission. Mr Neoh is also a member of the corporate boards of Bank of China, China Life, and formerly on the board of China Shenhua. Trained as a lawyer, he is a leading Chinese expert on monetary policy, economics and other financial regulatory issues. Neoh was appointed as Hong Kong Securities and Investment Institute as Honorary Fellow in 2008.

== Honours and awards ==
- Justice of the peace
- Doctor of Laws honoris causa, Chinese University of Hong Kong
- Doctor of Laws honoris causa, University of London
