= San Uk Ling =

Village in Man Kam To, Hong Kong

Coordinates: 22.5356524°N 114.132369°E

- Traditional Chinese: 新屋嶺
- Simplified Chinese: 新屋岭
Transcriptions
Yue: Cantonese
- Jyutping: san1 uk1 leng5

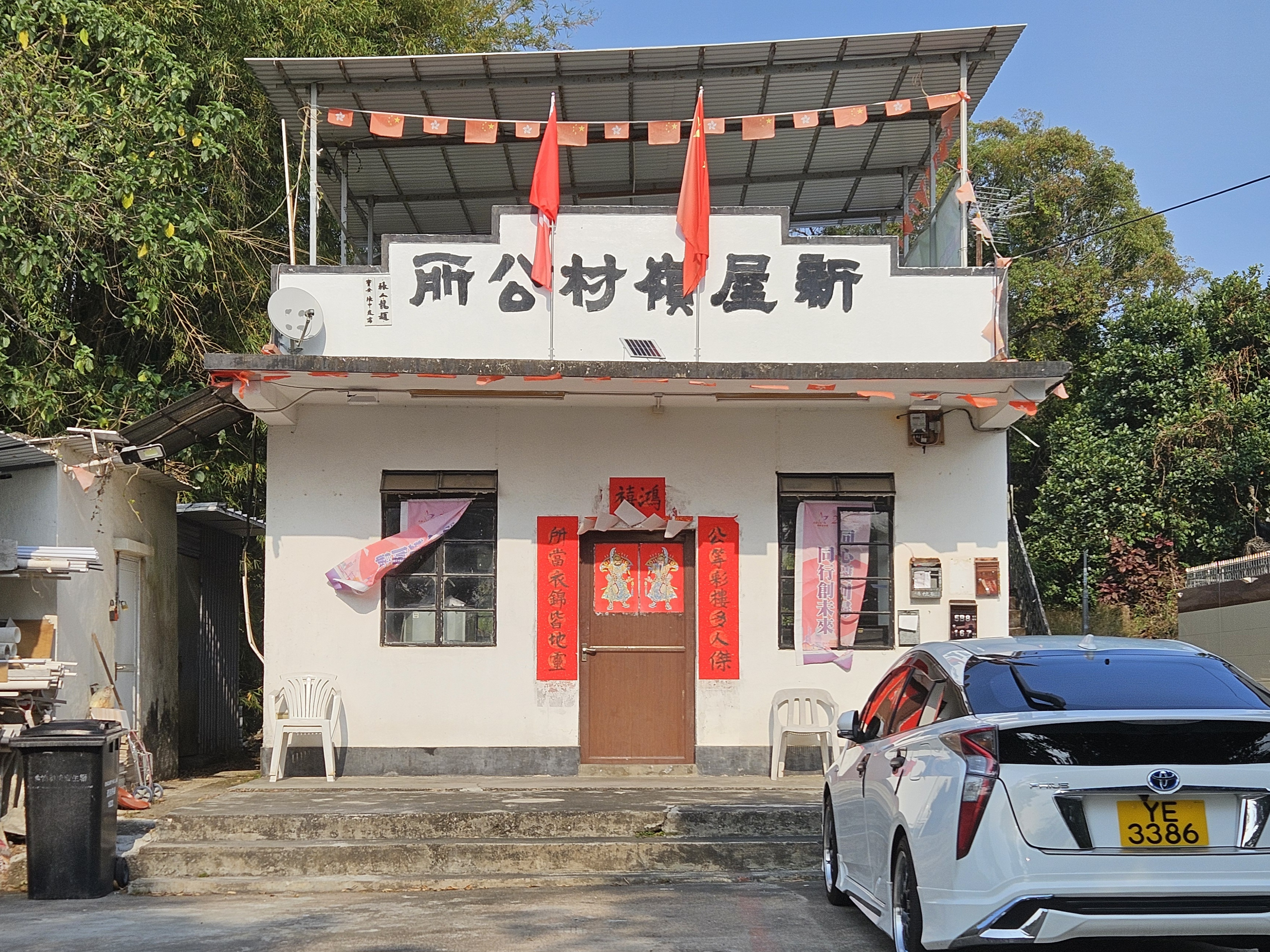
San Uk Ling Village Office.

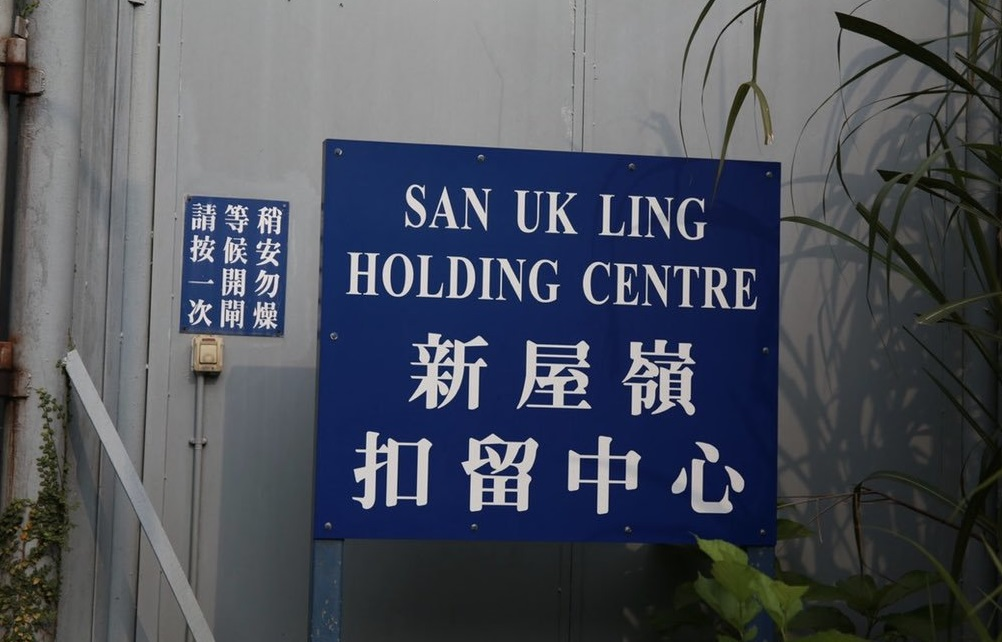
Entrance sign of San Uk Ling Holding Centre in San Uk Ling

San Uk Ling (Chinese: 新屋嶺) is a village in Man Kam To, North District, Hong Kong.

== Administration ==
San Uk Ling is a recognized village under the New Territories Small House Policy. It is one of the villages represented within the Ta Kwu Ling District Rural Committee. For electoral purposes, San Uk Ling is part of the Sha Ta constituency, which is currently represented by Ko Wai-kei.

== See also ==
- San Uk Ling Holding Centre
