= Complaints Against Police Office =

Unit within the Hong Kong Police Force

Complaints Against Police Office Chinese: 投訴警察課
- Abbreviation: CAPO

Jurisdictional structure
- Operations jurisdiction: Hong Kong

Operational structure
- Headquarters: G/F, Annex Block, Caine House, 3 Arsenal Street, Wanchai
- Agency executive: LAW, Shui Sum, Senior Superintendent of Police
- Parent agency: Hong Kong Police Force

Website
- Official website

Complaints Against Police Office
- Traditional Chinese: 投訴警察課
Transcriptions
Yue: Cantonese
- Yale Romanization: Tàuh sou gíng chaat fo
- Jyutping: Tau4 sou3 ging2 chaat3 fo3

The Complaints Against Police Office (CAPO) is a unit within the Hong Kong Police Force that handles complaints against the force's officers. The Office is part of the Complaints and Internal Investigations Branch of the force's Service Quality Wing.

All reviews conducted by CAPO are monitored by the Independent Police Complaints Council (IPCC).

In 2006 to 2008, 325 police officers were disciplined on substantiation of the complaints against them. Of these, 292 were given advice, 12 given warnings, 12 cautioned, two reprimanded, six severely reprimanded and one dismissed subsequent to criminal conviction.

There have been criticisms that CAPO lacks credibility and transparency in handling complaints against the police, and also that the IPCC has limited monitoring power.
