= Independent Police Complaints Council =

Hong Kong police oversight body

- 獨立監察警方處理投訴委員會

Independent body overview
- Formed: 1986
- Preceding agencies: Police Complaints Committee; UMELCO Police Group
- Jurisdiction: Hong Kong
- Headquarters: 10/F China Resources Building 26 Harbour Road Wan Chai
- Annual budget: HK$95.9 million (2019–20)
- Independent body executive: Anthony Francis Neoh, Chairman
- Website: www.ipcc.gov.hk

Independent Police Complaints Council
- Traditional Chinese: 獨立監察警方處理投訴委員會
Transcriptions
Yue: Cantonese
- Yale Romanization: Duhk laahp gāam chaat gíng fōng chyú léih tàuh sou wái yùhn wúi
- Jyutping: Duk^{6} laap^{6} gaam^{1} caat^{3} ging^{2} fong^{1} cyu^{2} lei^{5} tau^{4} sou^{3} wai^{2} jyun^{4} wui^{2}

The Independent Police Complaints Council (IPCC) is a civilian body of the Government of Hong Kong, part of the two-tier system in which the Hong Kong Police Force investigates complaints made by the public against its members and the IPCC monitors those investigations.

The IPCC acts as an independent body to monitor the review by the Complaints Against Police Office (CAPO) of complaints against members of the Police Force. Unlike CAPO, which is a unit of the police force, the IPCC is a civilian body not linked with the police that reports directly to the office of the Chief Executive of Hong Kong. There have been criticisms in LegCo that the IPCC has limited monitoring power.

== History ==
The IPCC was set up in 1986 as the Police Complaints Committee or PCC, which reported to the then-Governor of Hong Kong. The PCC was preceded by the UMELCO Police Group, a body within the Office of the Unofficial Members of the Executive and Legislative Councils. The PCC was renamed to its current name in 1994.

The IPCC is headed by a Secretariat and is governed by the Independent Police Complaints Council (IPCC) Ordinance, which was enacted in July 2008. On 1 June 2009, after the ordinance came into operation, the Chinese official name of IPCC was changed from "投訴警方獨立監察委員會" to "獨立監察警方處理投訴委員會" while the English name remained the same.

== Organisation ==
- Secretariat
- Secretary
- Deputy Secretary
- Legal Adviser
- Transitional Arrangements Team
- Senior PR Officer
- Case Teams (3)
- Planning and Support Teams

== Composition ==
The IPCC Ordinance stipulates that the IPCC shall be formed by a chairman, three vice-chairmen, and no fewer than eight other members. All members are appointed by the Chief Executive of Hong Kong. Persons holding an "office of emolument" within a government bureau or department, as well as former members of the police force, are not eligible to be appointed to the IPCC.

As of 4 September 2019, the IPCC had 29 members:

- Chairman
  - Anthony Neoh
- Vice-chairmen
  - Christopher Cheung
  - Tony Tse
  - Frankie Yick
- Members
  - Lisa LAU Man-man
  - SO Lai-chun
  - Eric CHENG Kam-chung
  - Richard HO Kam-wing
  - Herman Hui
  - Edgar KWAN Chi-ping
  - Barry CHIN Chi-yung
  - José-Antonio MAURELLET
  - Clement CHAN Kam-wing
  - Wilson KWONG Wing-tsuen
  - Ann AU Chor-kwan
  - Alex CHU‍ Wing-yiu
  - Douglas LAM Tak-yip
  - Sylvia LEE Hiu-wah
  - David‍ LEE Ka-yan
  - Melissa Kaye PANG
  - Shalini Shivan SUJANANI
  - Martin WONG Chi-sang
  - Johnny YU Wah-yung
  - Anissa Chan
  - Roland WONG Ka-yeung
  - LEE Man-bun
  - Jane Curzon LO
  - Paul Lam Ting-kwok
  - Helen Yu Lai Ching-ping

== List of chairmen ==
1. Chen Shou-lum, CBE, JP (1986–1987)
2. Daniel Tse Chi-wai, GBS, CBE, JP (1987–1993)
3. Rosanna Wong Yick-ming, DBE, JP (1993)
4. Denis Chang Khen-lee, CBE, QC, SC, JP (1993–1998)
5. Robert Tang Kwok-ching, GBM, SBS, QC, SC, JP (2000–2004)
6. Ronny Wong Fook-hum, SBS, MBE, QC, SC, JP (2004–2008)
7. Jat Sew-tong, SBS, SC, JP (2008–2014)
8. Larry Kwok Lam-kwong, SBS, JP (2014–2018)
9. Anthony Francis Neoh, QC, SC, JP (2018–2021)
10. Priscilla Wong Pui-sze, BBS, JP (2021– )

== Criticism ==
The IPCC, as noted by the UN Human Rights Committee in its Concluding Observations in 2013, has limited powers and lacks independence. It only has "advisory and oversight functions to monitor and review the activities of the CAPO" and its members are political appointees chosen by the Chief Executive. It neither has legal power to summon witnesses nor offers protection to the victims and witnesses.

Despite a considerable number of reportable complaints filed with the CAPO, only a small percentage of them were classified as substantiated. Between 2004 and 2018, CAPO received 6,412 complaints alleging police assault. Only four cases were substantiated by CAPO, while over half of the cases were dismissed without actionable conclusions. Between 2010 and 2018, among all of the cases on police misconduct substantiated by the IPCC, the police responded by referring only one case for prosecution, while officers in the majority of cases were only given "advice".

As members of the IPCC are directly appointed by the Chief Executive, the council is generally aligned with pro-establishment figures. The former Chief Executive Leung Chun-ying, for instance, drew criticism for appointing Barry Chin Chi-yung, a member of the pro-Beijing political group Silent Majority for Hong Kong, to the council. Where Chin was an outspoken critic of the 2014 pro-democracy protests, which saw allegations of police brutality. In 2017, Chief Executive Carrie Lam sought to enhance the credibility of the IPCC by appointing Anthony Francis Neoh, a heavyweight in the legal sector, as its chairman.

Clifford Stott, one of five members of an expert panel recruited for the IPCC in September during the 2019–20 Hong Kong protests, has reaffirmed that the powers, capacity, and independent investigative capability of the body was not commensurate with the "standards required of an international police watchdog operating in a society that values freedoms and rights". According to Stott, "structural limitations in the scope and powers of the IPCC inquiry [inhibit] its ability to establish a coherent and representative body of evidence". In its resignation statement in December, the panel said the IPCC "needs to substantially enhance its capacity" so as to be able to "assemble a coherent account of the facts from police and other bodies; to access important documents and validate accounts supplied by police and others in a timely fashion; and to significantly improve its capability to identify and secure evidence from key witnesses outside policing".

In response, Carrie Lam remarked that Stott had "only spent 10 days or a week in Hong Kong. His stay in Hong Kong was quite short compared to the year-long review of so much information by the IPCC. Therefore everyone can tell which side was able to obtain the truth and have a better understanding of Hong Kong" regarding the latest IPCC thematic report on the 2019-20 Hong Kong protests. Lam added that the IPCC is made up of members with varying backgrounds and expertise, and their objectiveness is reliable.

The Court of First Instance reported on November 20 that the IPCC and the Complaints Against Police Office (CAPO) cannot effectively conduct investigation into misconduct unless new powers were given.

In September 2022, Helen Yu Lai Ching-ping, an IPCC member, blamed Hong Kong's child abuse cases on "widespread" sexual and violent content on TV. Yu also blamed the TVB Miss Hong Kong Pageant, to which TVB said that the pageant should not be associated with child abuse. TVB also said that it reserved the right to pursue legal action against false accusations.

== Report on 2019 Hong Kong protests ==
The IPCC released a thousand-page report on policing during the 2019–20 Hong Kong protests in which the police was generally exonerated. It concluded that officers generally acted within guidelines but there was "room for improvement".

Findings mirrored police assertions that force was only in reaction to the violent unrest, but said there were "areas for improvement" when officers interacted with protesters. While Chief executive Lam praised the "comprehensive and objective" report, Rights groups and pro democracy parties universally pointed to the lack of independence of the IPCC and the absence of police accountability, and expressed outrage at the report as an absurd and preposterous whitewash. Lam said priority for implementation were a code of practice for journalists covering protests; more powers to monitor social media and tackle misinformation; reviewing internal police command structures; and identification of police officers with clear numbers. Clifford Stott, who quit the IPCC foreign experts panel, said: "It would seem the release of the IPCC report is part of a wider set of coordinated announcements designed to deliver the new 'truth'".

FactWire performed fact-checking on the report. It reviewed the videos during the police's kettling of protesters into the CITIC Tower on 12 June 2019, and rebutted the report's claim that Tim Mei Avenue was unobstructed for the crowd to leave. It also pointed out the report denied the fact that the 21 July 2019 Yuen Long attack was an indiscriminate attack by inappropriately labelling it as clashes between black and white-clad crowds.

== See also ==
- Ontario Police Commission
