= 25 August 2019 Hong Kong protest =

Protest march in Hong Kong

- Part of 2019–2020 Hong Kong protests
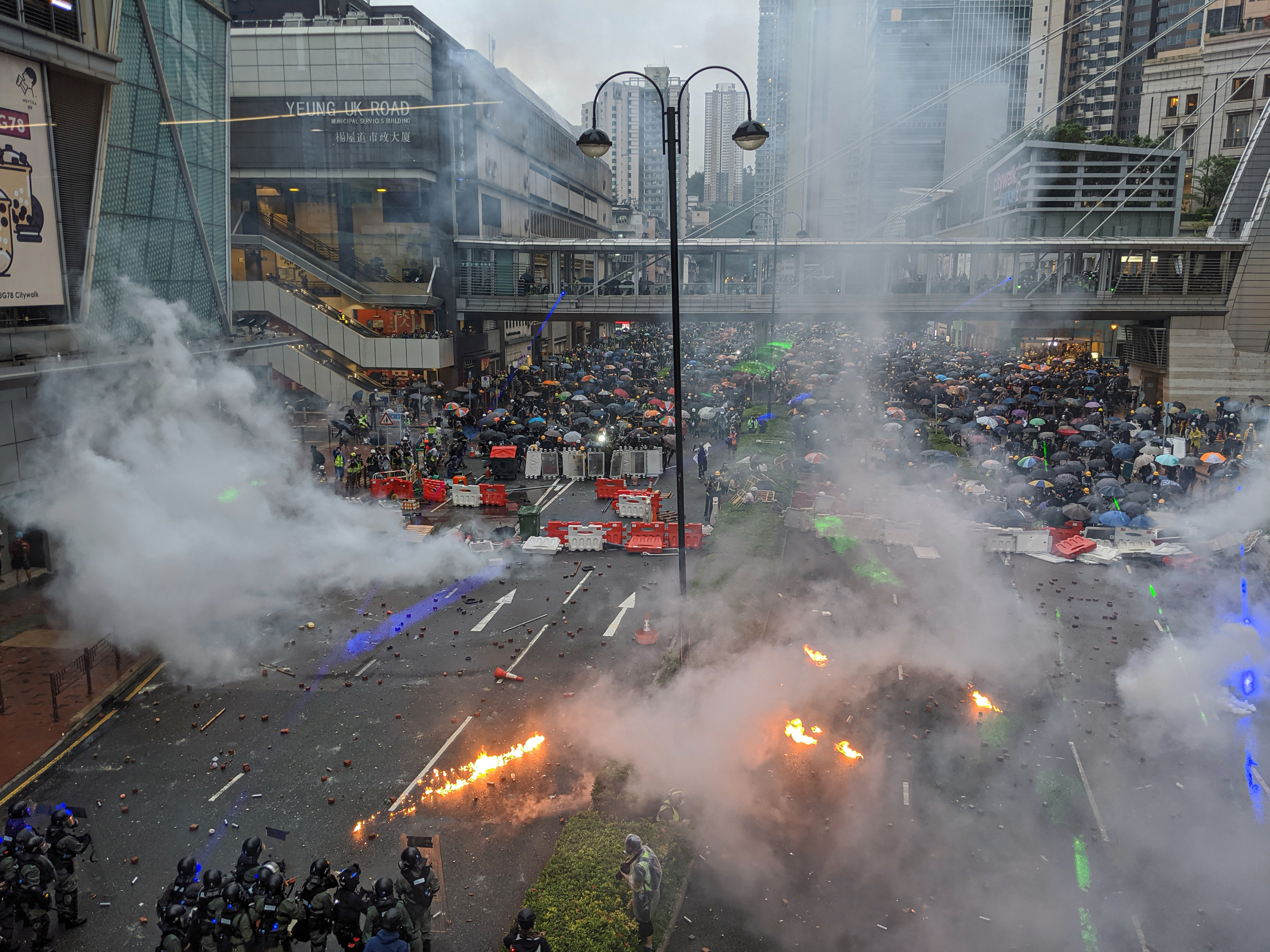
- The scene of violent clashes between protesters and police. At around 5:30 p.m., riot police fired several canisters of tear gas near Yeung Uk Road near the Yeung Uk Commercial District to disperse protesters, who responded with gasoline bombs and laser pointers.
- Date: 25 August 2019
- Location: Hong Kong New Territories, Hong Kong; Kwai Chung Sports Ground, Kwai Tsing District (starting point); Tsuen Wan Park, Tsuen Wan District (ending point)
- Goals: Five Demands: Full withdrawal of the extradition bill; Retraction of the characterisation of protests as "riots"; Release and exoneration of arrested protesters; Establishment of an independent commission of inquiry into police behaviour; Resignation of Carrie Lam and universal suffrage for the Legislative Council and the chief executive elections
- Methods: Marches, rallies (originally planned); Flash mob blockades, graffiti, clashes between police and protesters (later developed)
- Result: Some public services were suspended or service schedules were rescheduled.; Marches and rallies were ended early at the request of the police.; Hong Kong Police Force used tear gas (from the afternoon to the evening), rubber bullets, pepper bullets, sponge grenades and bean bag rounds to clear the area.; For the first time, the police used a Special Purpose Vehicle for crowd management.; A 12-year-old boy was arrested on suspicion of unlawful assembly.; Businesses, including mahjong parlors around Yi Pei Square, were vandalised.; A uniformed police officer fired a shot on Chung On Street, marking the first instance of gunfire in the Anti-Extradition Law Amendment Bill Movement.; Some protesters moved to Kowloon and damaged some public facilities.; The HKSAR Government and the police refused to meet the demands of the protesters and condemned the escalating violence and destruction by the protesters.

Parties
Protesters	Hong Kong Police Force

A protest march was held on 25 August 2019, as part of the 2019–2020 Hong Kong protests. The march took place in the Tsuen Wan and Kwai Tsing districts, starting at the Kwai Chung Sports Ground and passing through streets such as Kuai Fuk Road and Yeung Uk Road, ending at Tsuen Wan Park. The march was organized by the Tsuen Kwai Tsing March Preparation Group, with Lam Kai-hong as the applicant and Yu Ngai-ming as the coordinator. Due to the conflicts that arose during the march and rally, the Specialised Crowd Management Vehicle (water cannon vehicle) was used for the first time that day, and water was sprayed twice within an hour.

The march and rally eventually ended early, and after the Hong Kong Police (hereinafter referred to as "the police") cleared the area, some protesters moved to Yi Pei Square, where a suspected white-clad gang attack had occurred earlier, and vandalized businesses such as mahjong parlors. They also clashed with several police officers; police later confirmed that a uniformed officer had fired a shot, marking the first instance of live ammunition being used in the crackdown on the Anti-Extradition Law Amendment Movement. On the evening of the march, police also arrested a 12-year-old boy from Lingnan Hang Yee Memorial Secondary School who was about to enter Form 1, making him the youngest person arrested during the Anti-Extradition Law Amendment Bill Movement at the time.

The march and rally sparked widespread controversy over both the police's use of force and the protesters' vandalism. Several MTR stations and bus lines suspended services in response to the march and rally, and the MTR's decision to close stations also became a point of contention. Some recreational facilities managed by the Leisure and Cultural Services Department also closed early due to the march and rally.

== Date and route ==
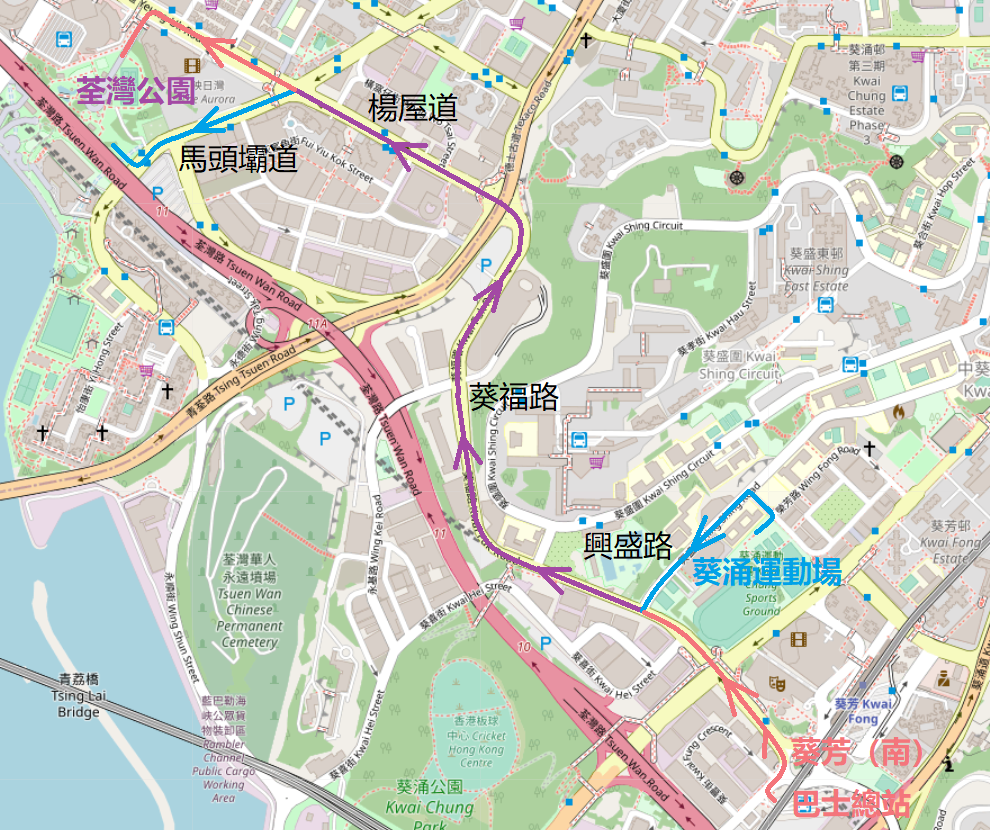
A map of the parade route shows the original route in red, the final route in blue, and the unchanged route in purple.

The march was organized by the Tsuen Kwai Tsing March Preparatory Committee, with Lam Kai-hong as the applicant and Yu Ngai-ming as the coordinator. The march took place on 25 August 2019, in the Tsuen Wan and Kwai Tsing districts of Hong Kong, starting from Kwai Chung Sports Ground, passing through Kuai Fuk Road, Yeung Uk Road, and other roads, and ending at Tsuen Wan Park. The original date for the march was 18 August, but it was postponed by a week because the Civil Human Rights Front later planned to hold a march on the same day (eventually, the "Stop the Police-Triad Collusion, Implement the Five Demands" rally). The original plan for the march was to gather at Kwai Fong (South) Bus Terminal at 2:30 p.m. on 25 August, with the march starting at 3:00 p.m. and concluding at Tsuen Wan Park for a rally. On 23 August, the police issued a letter of objection to the march, citing the bus terminal as an unsuitable gathering place. However, the central plaza of Tsuen Wan Park, where the rally was scheduled to be held from 5:00 p.m. to 8:00 p.m., was approved. The applicant appealed and reached an agreement with the police on the march route during an appeal hearing on 24 August, after which the appeal was withdrawn. The march was subsequently approved, with the gathering point changed to Kwai Chung Sports Ground for safety reasons, and the organizers agreed to march along the sidewalks. After the route was revised, the gathering point, start time, and endpoint remained the same, but the route was altered to enter Kwai Fuk Road via Hing Shing Road and proceed to Tsuen Wan Park via Ma Tau Pa Road, bypassing a section of Yeung Uk Road.

== Events ==
=== Early stages ===
Before the official gathering time, many citizens had already gathered at Kwai Chung Sports Ground, with some taking shelter from the rain in the stands. At 2:45 p.m., the march began, with many parents bringing their children along. During the march, some participants had already moved onto the roadway near CITIC Telecom Tower in Kwai Chung, occupying part of Kwai Fuk Road. Vehicles occasionally passed by, and the protesters made way. By 3:20 p.m., the front of the march had reached Yeung Uk Road. Due to the large number of participants, multiple traffic lanes on Yeung Uk Road were occupied. By 3:35 p.m., the front of the march reached Tsuen Wan Park. At 4:00 p.m., the organizers announced that the rally would be conducted in a "flowing" manner, allowing participants to leave and then return to the rally after circling around. The organizers also stated that the tail of the march was still waiting to start at the gathering point.

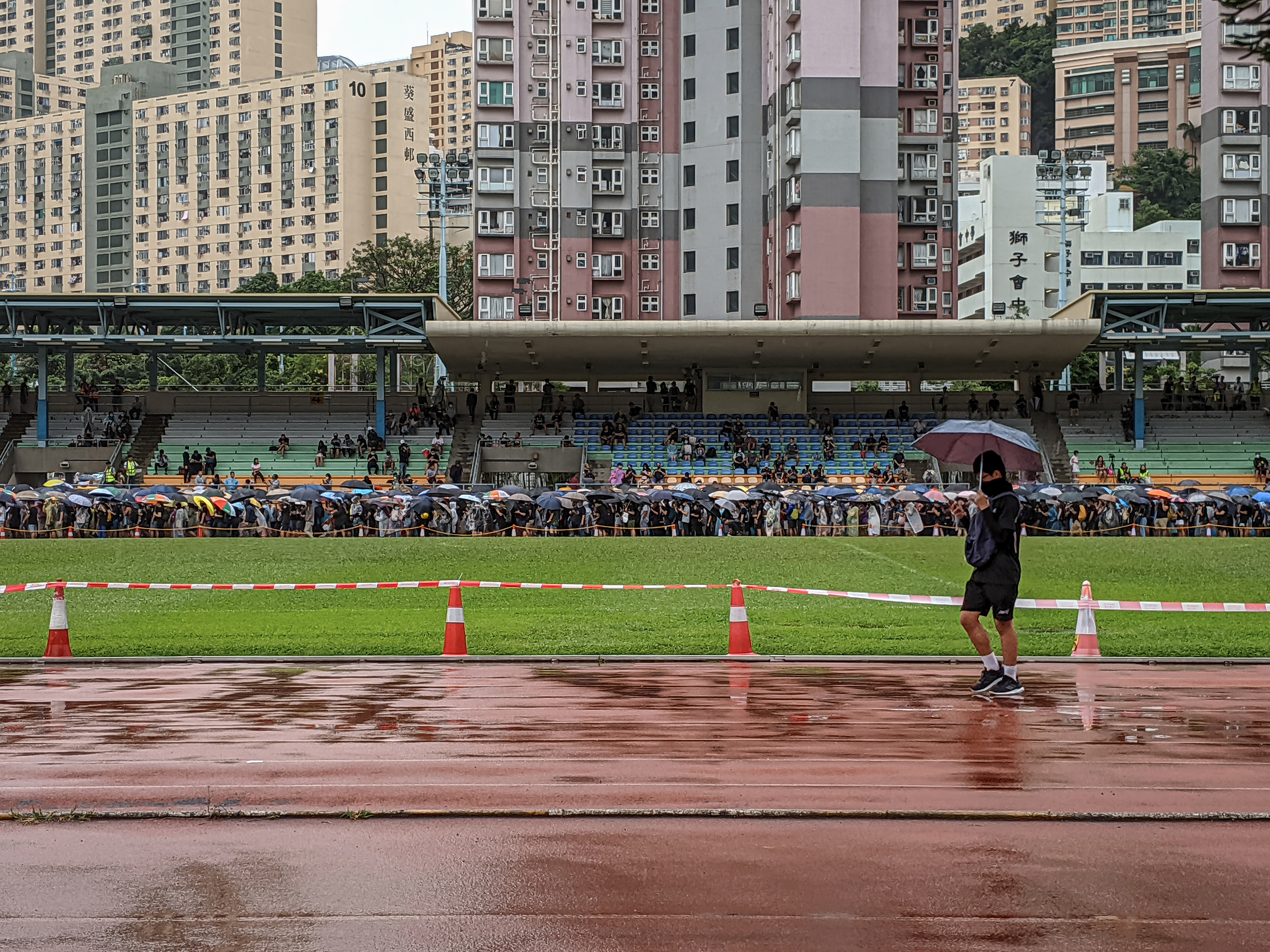
Before the gathering time, many citizens had already gathered at Kwai Chung Sports Ground.

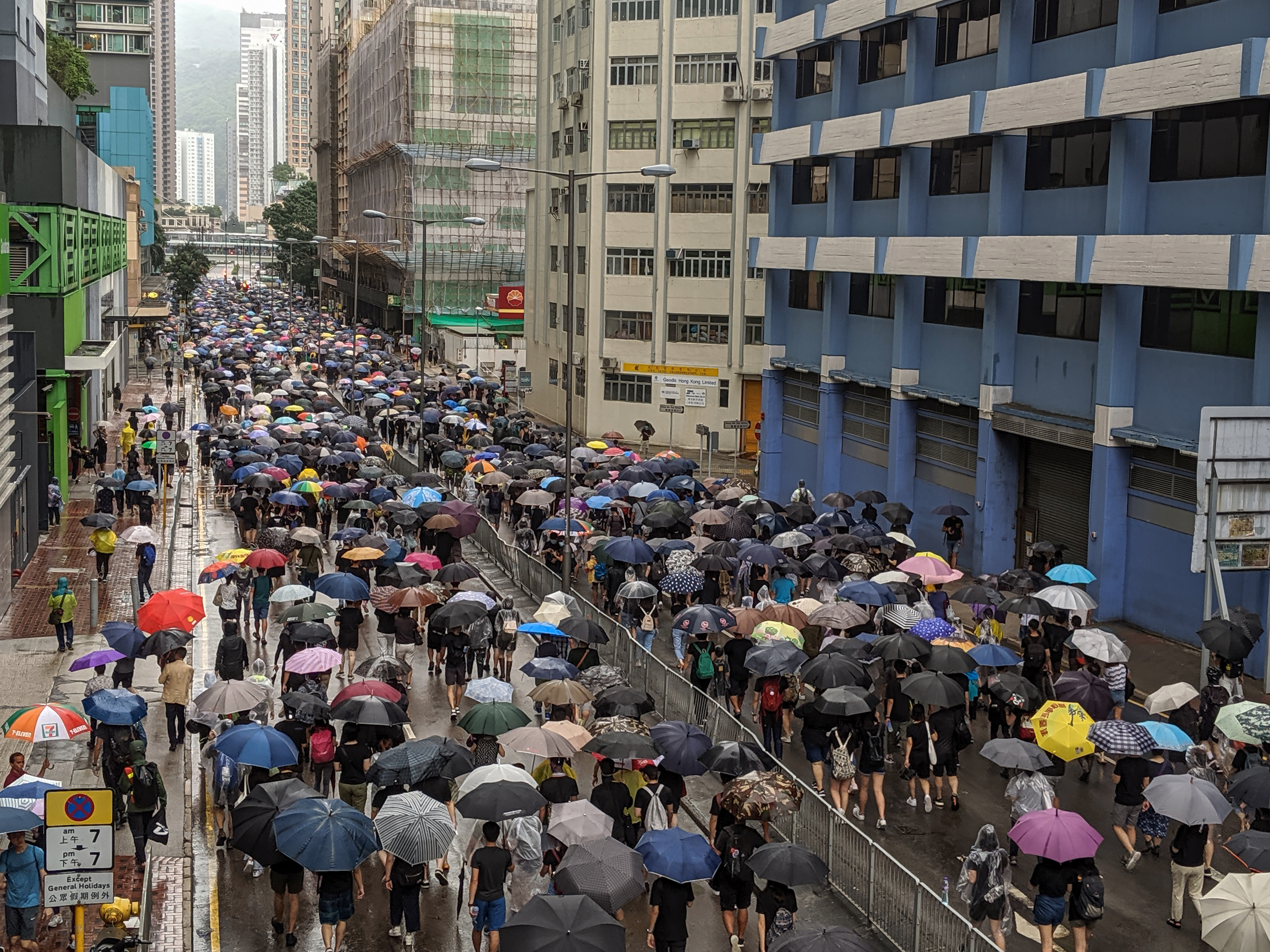
Participants in the rally marched through Yeung Uk Road in the rain, occupying all traffic lanes.

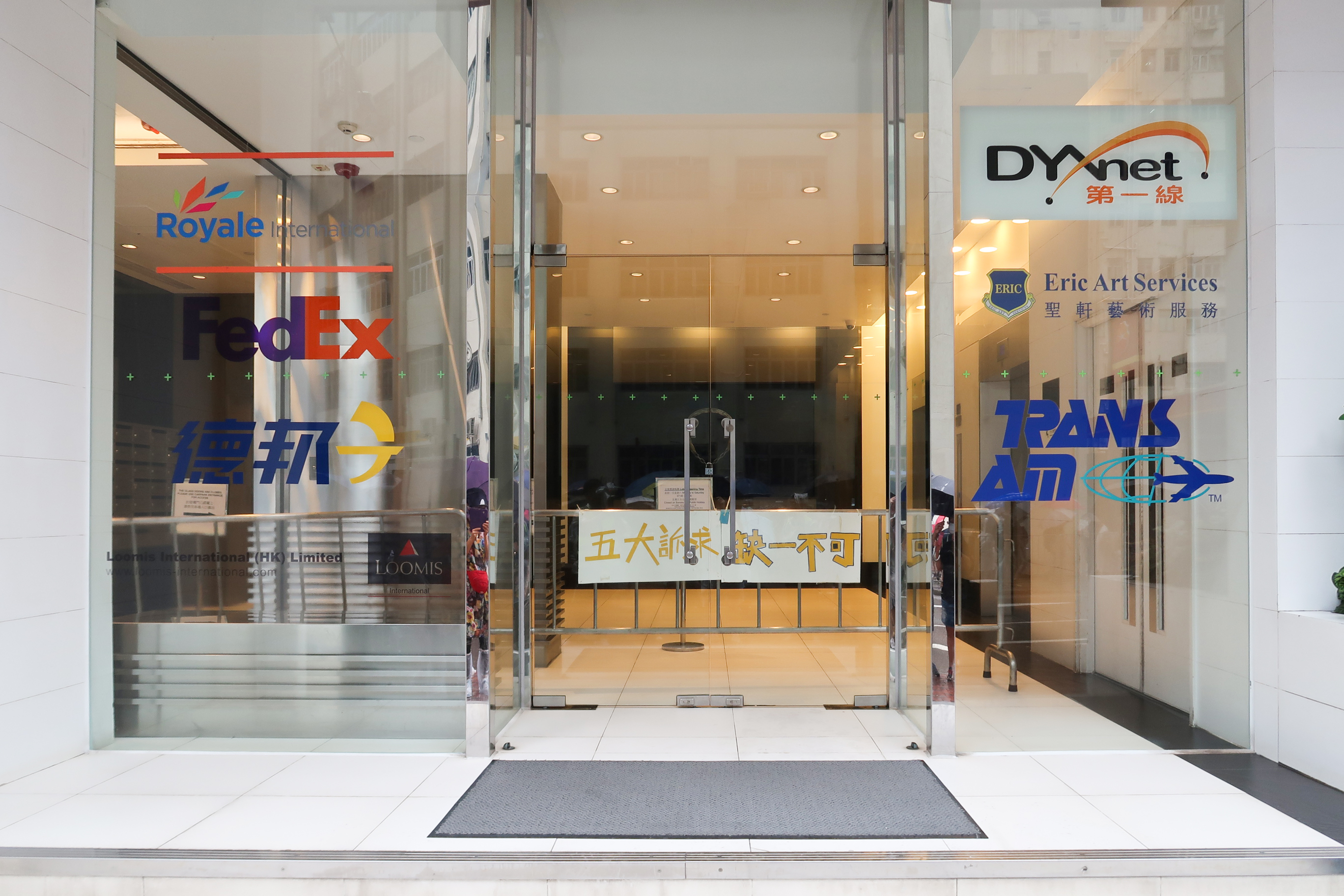
A banner reading "Five Demands, Not One Less" was placed on a barricade at the entrance of the International Commerce Centre.

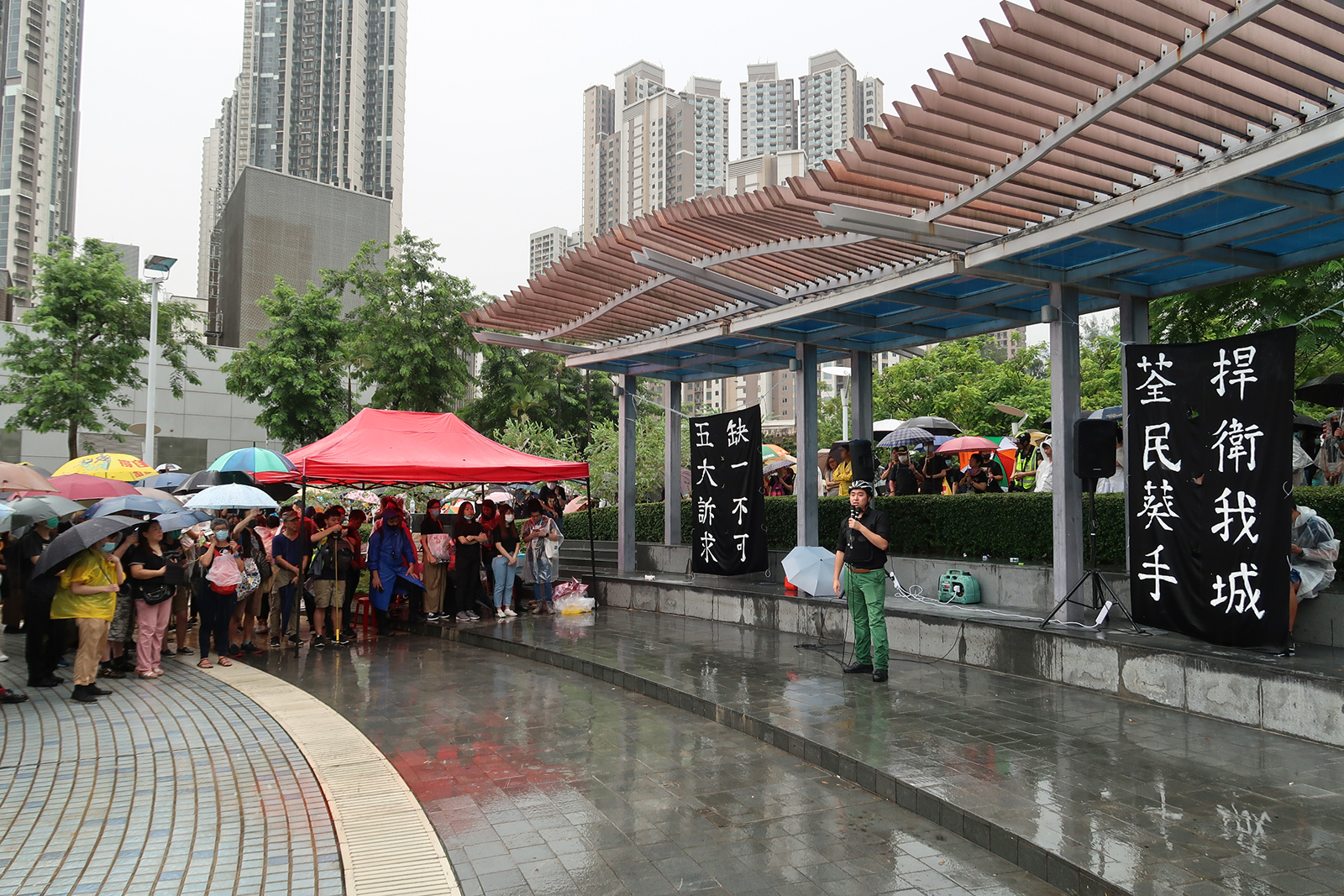
A rally was held at Tsuen Wan Park, the endpoint of the march.
Panoramic view of the march

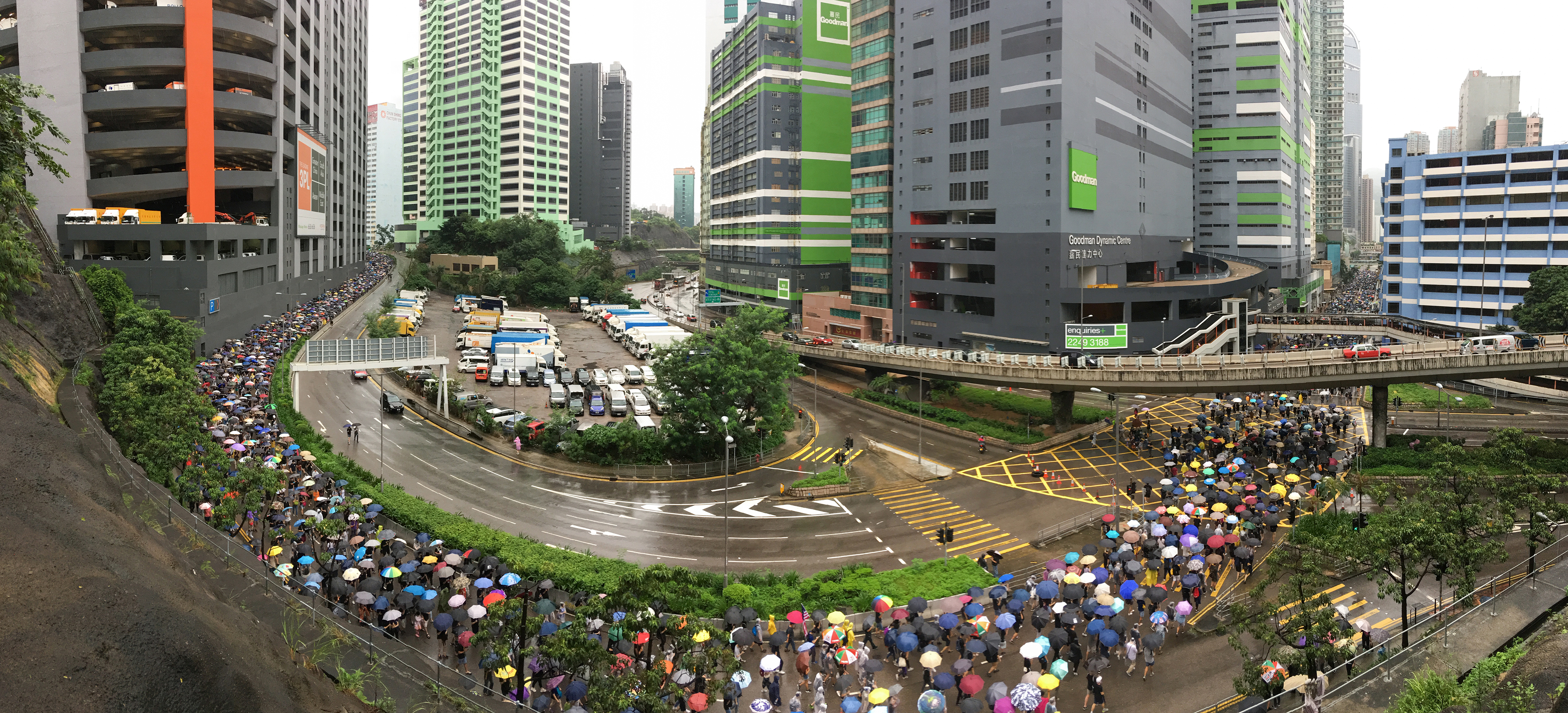
A full view of Kwai Fuk Road, where participants had already moved onto the roadway, occupying part of Kwai Fuk Road.

=== Protesters set up roadblocks ===
At around 4:00 p.m., some protesters began dismantling roadside railings and barriers from nearby construction sites on Texaco Road to set up roadblocks; later, roadblocks were also set up at the intersection of Yeung Uk Road and Ma Tau Pa Road. Roadblocks also appeared at Texaco Road and Luen Yan Street. At 4:40 p.m., the police announced that the Tsuen Wan Police Station report room was temporarily closed and urged protesters not to block emergency vehicle access to avoid affecting emergency services for the public. At 4:48 p.m., riot police arrived at Yeung Uk Road.

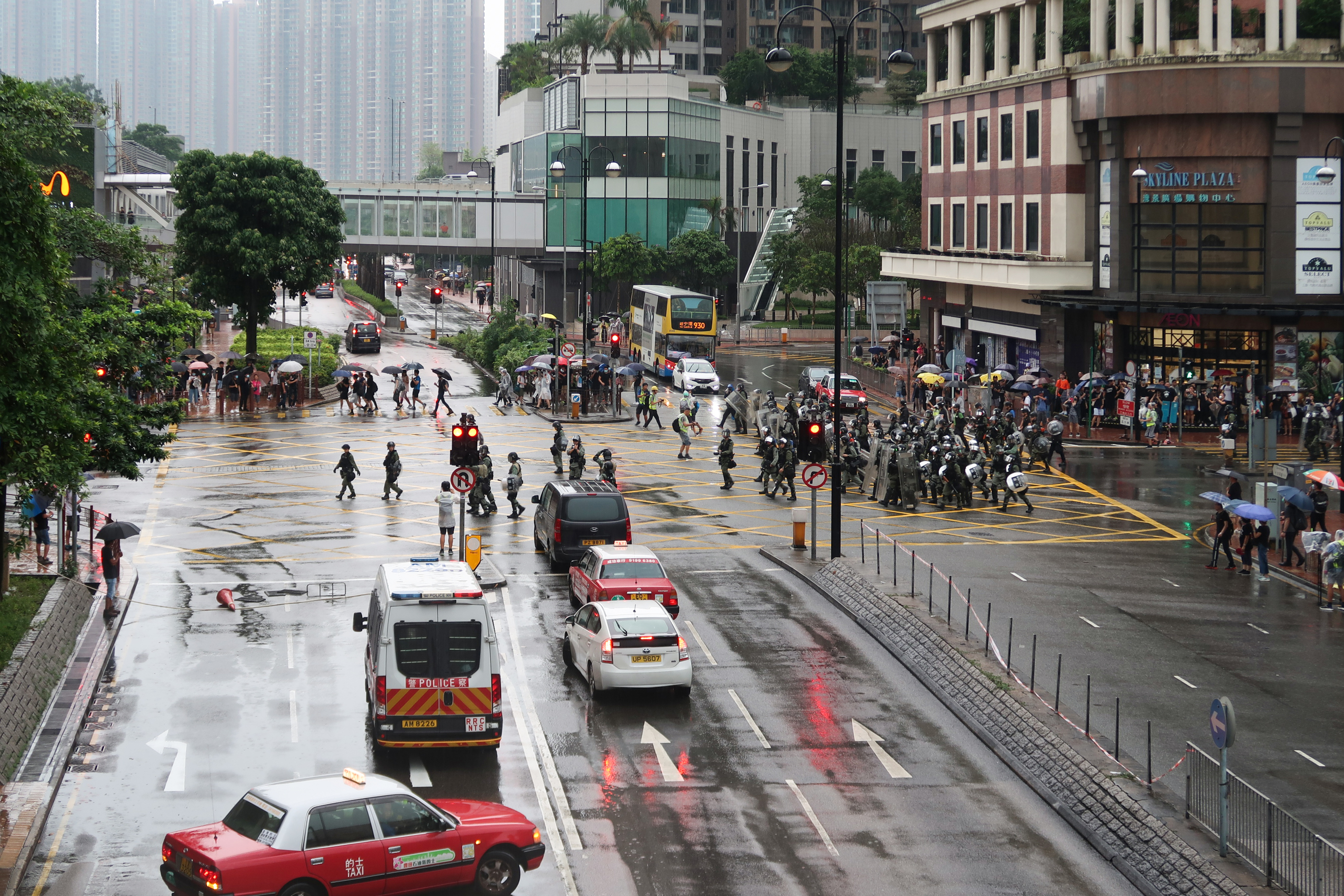
At 4:48 p.m., several riot police arrived at Yeung Uk Road.

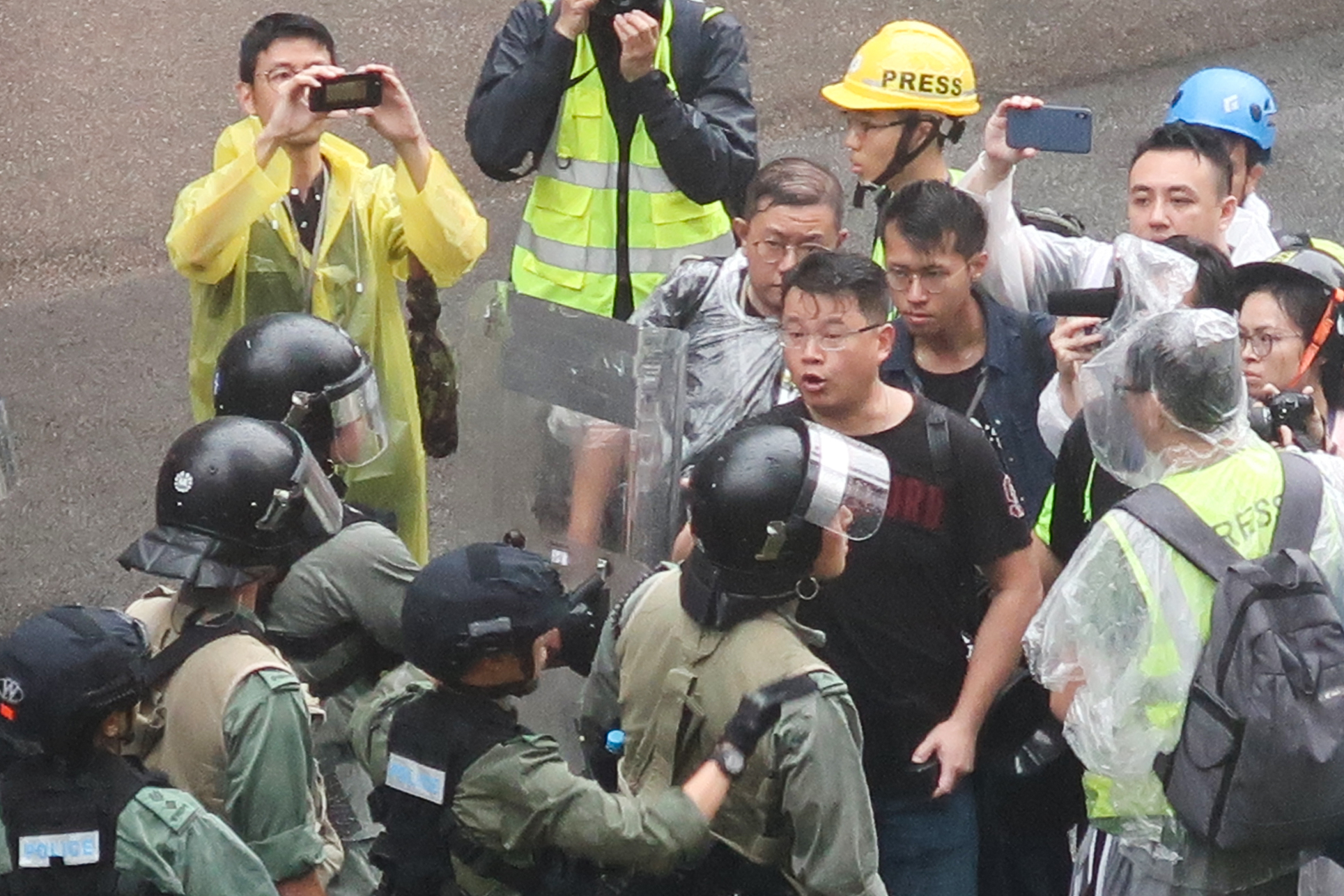
Hong Kong Legislative Council member Lam Cheuk-ting arguing with riot police.

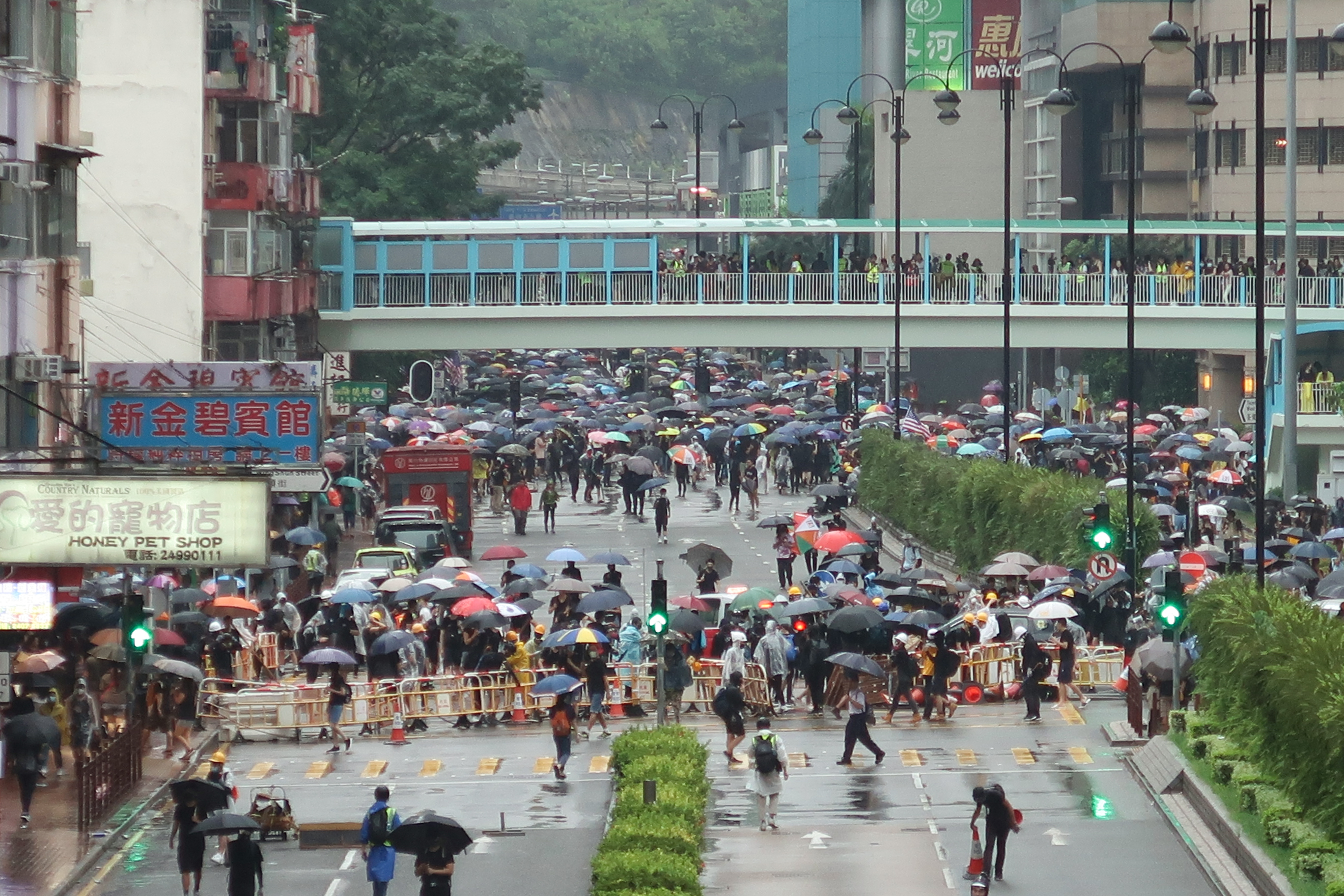
Protesters used materials from a nearby construction site to set up roadblocks on Yeung Uk Road.

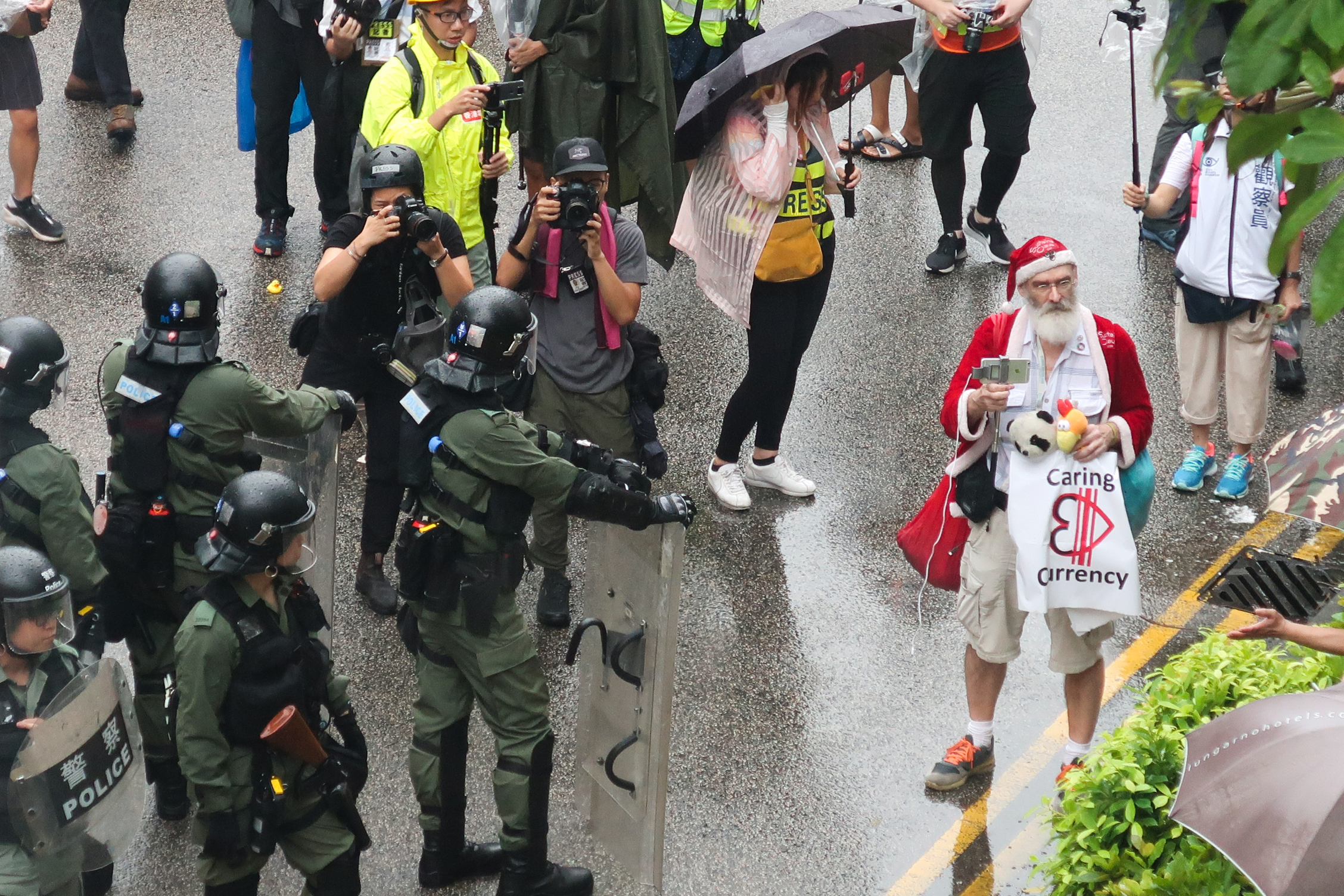
A non-Chinese protester dressed as Santa Claus was asked by riot police to return to the pavement.

=== Police used a water cannon vehicle for the first time to clear the area ===
At around 5:30 p.m., the police fired multiple tear gas rounds near the Yeung Uk Road Complex, close to Nina Tower. At around 5:40 p.m., the police raised an orange flag, warning that they would fire live ammunition. At around 5:50 p.m., a water cannon vehicle arrived at the protest site in Tsuen Wan. At around 6:10 p.m., the march organizers stated that they had received notification from the police that the rally at Tsuen Wan Park needed to be dispersed, and riot police had also sealed off all entrances to Tsuen Wan Park; the organizers then announced the end of the march and rally. At the same time, the water cannon vehicle sprayed water at the roadblocks on Tai Ho Road to try to remove the obstacles, but the attempt was unsuccessful, and the barriers were eventually removed by the Special Tactical Contingent. Afterward, the police cleared the area on Yeung Uk Road and Texaco Road, raising black and orange flags at the Yeung Uk Road Complex and firing multiple tear gas rounds. Protesters retaliated with petrol bombs and laser pointers before retreating to the Tsuen Wan Plaza shopping mall, where they used firefighting equipment to wet the floor and prevent the police from entering the mall. Some protesters left through the back entrance of the mall and headed towards Tsuen Wan Riviera Park. Another group of protesters retreated to the inner streets around Chung On Street, where roadblocks were still in place at the intersection of Sha Tsui Road and Chuen Lung Street.

At around 6:55 p.m., the police used water cannons on Texaco Road to disperse the protesters. At around 6:00 p.m., two men in blue shirts and one man in black had a confrontation with the protesters on Chung On Street, during which one of the men in blue retrieved a metal pole from the trunk of a taxi and began attacking the protesters, injuring several of them. The three men were later arrested, and 27 metal rods were found in the taxi.

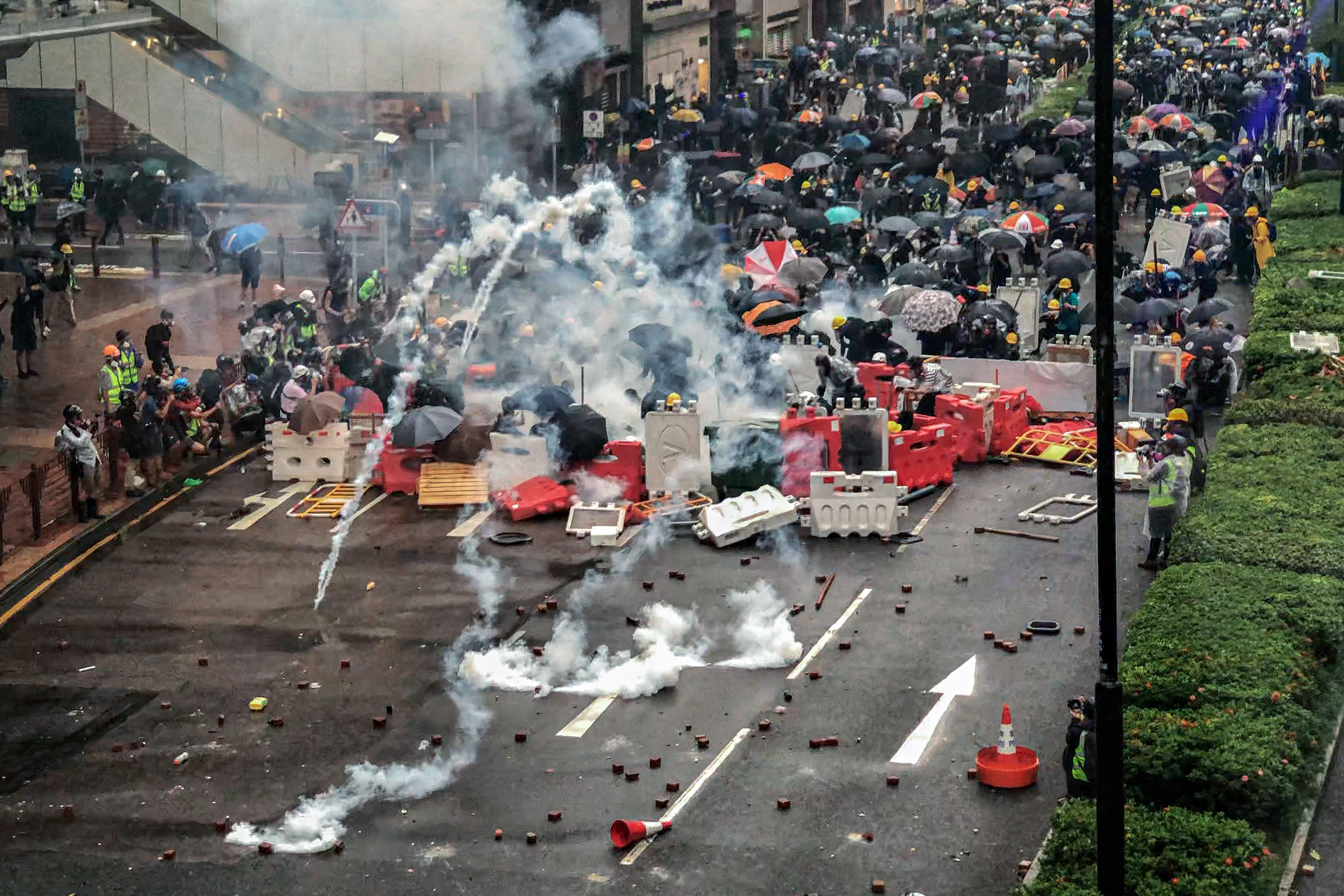
At around 5:30 p.m., police fired several rounds of tear gas outside Yeung Uk Road Complex.

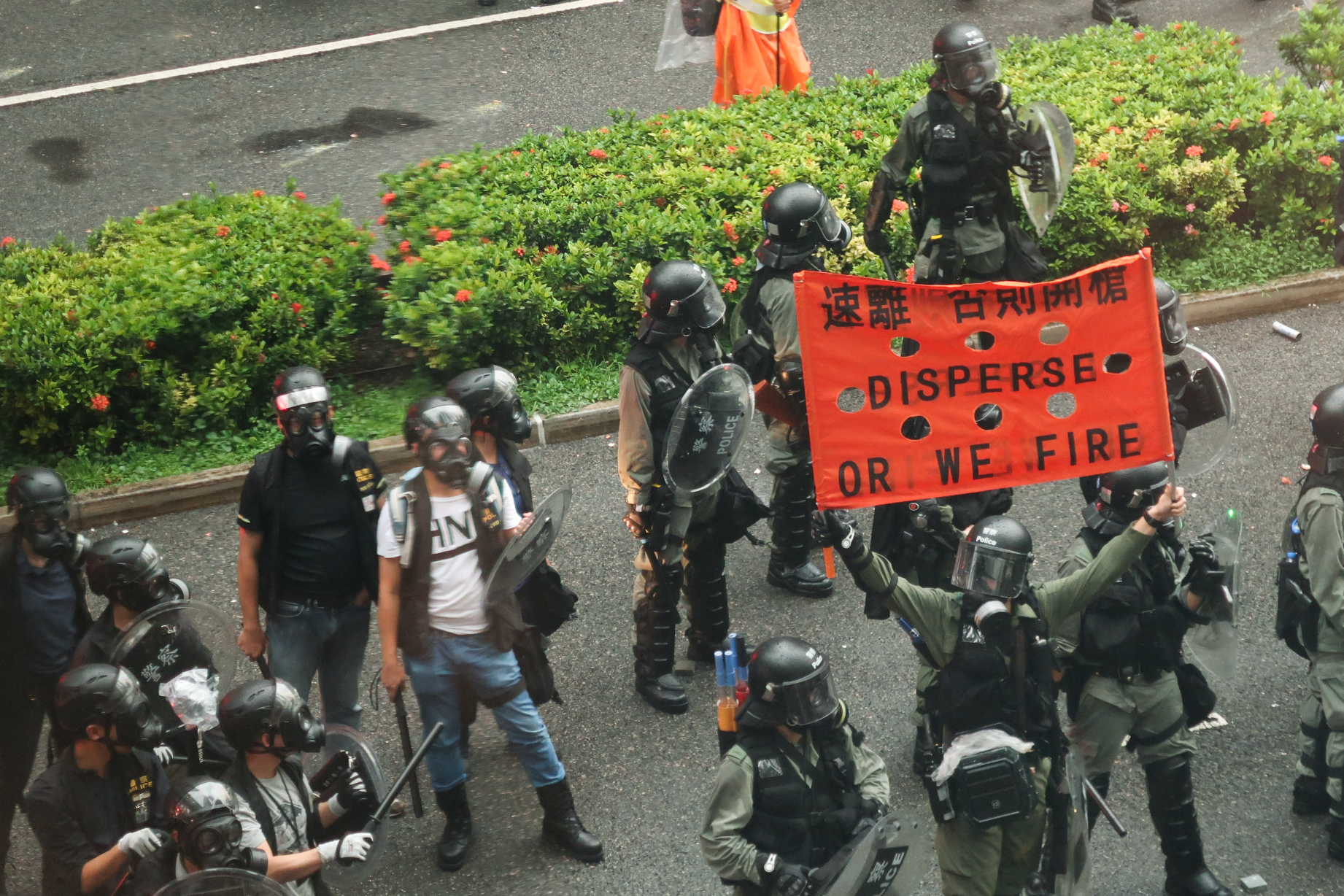
At around 5:40 p.m., riot police raised an orange flag

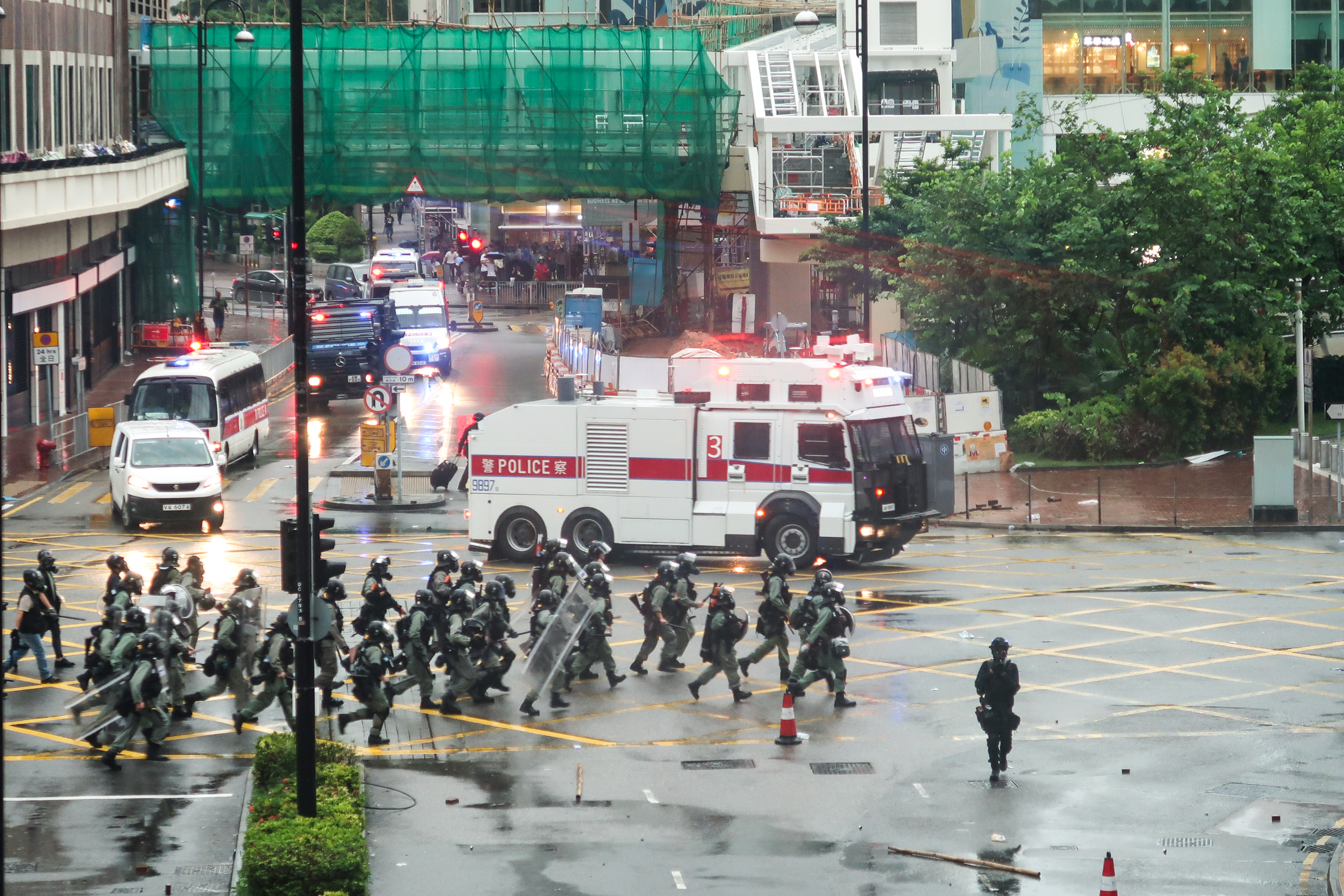
The Special Tactical Contingent used the water cannon vehicle for the first time during the march and headed towards Tai Ho Road.

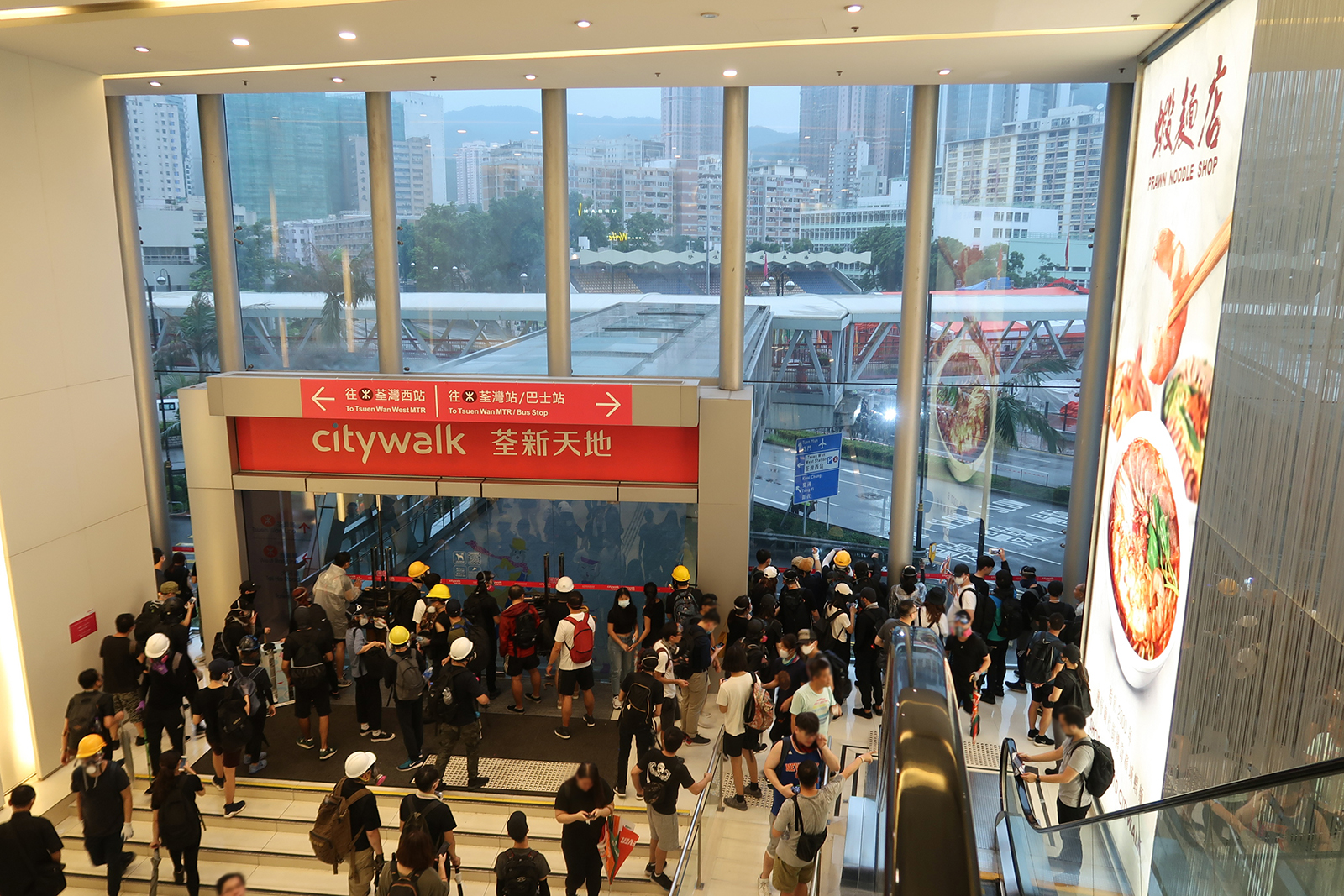
Protesters returned to Tsuen Wan Plaza, where they blocked the entrances to prevent the police from entering.

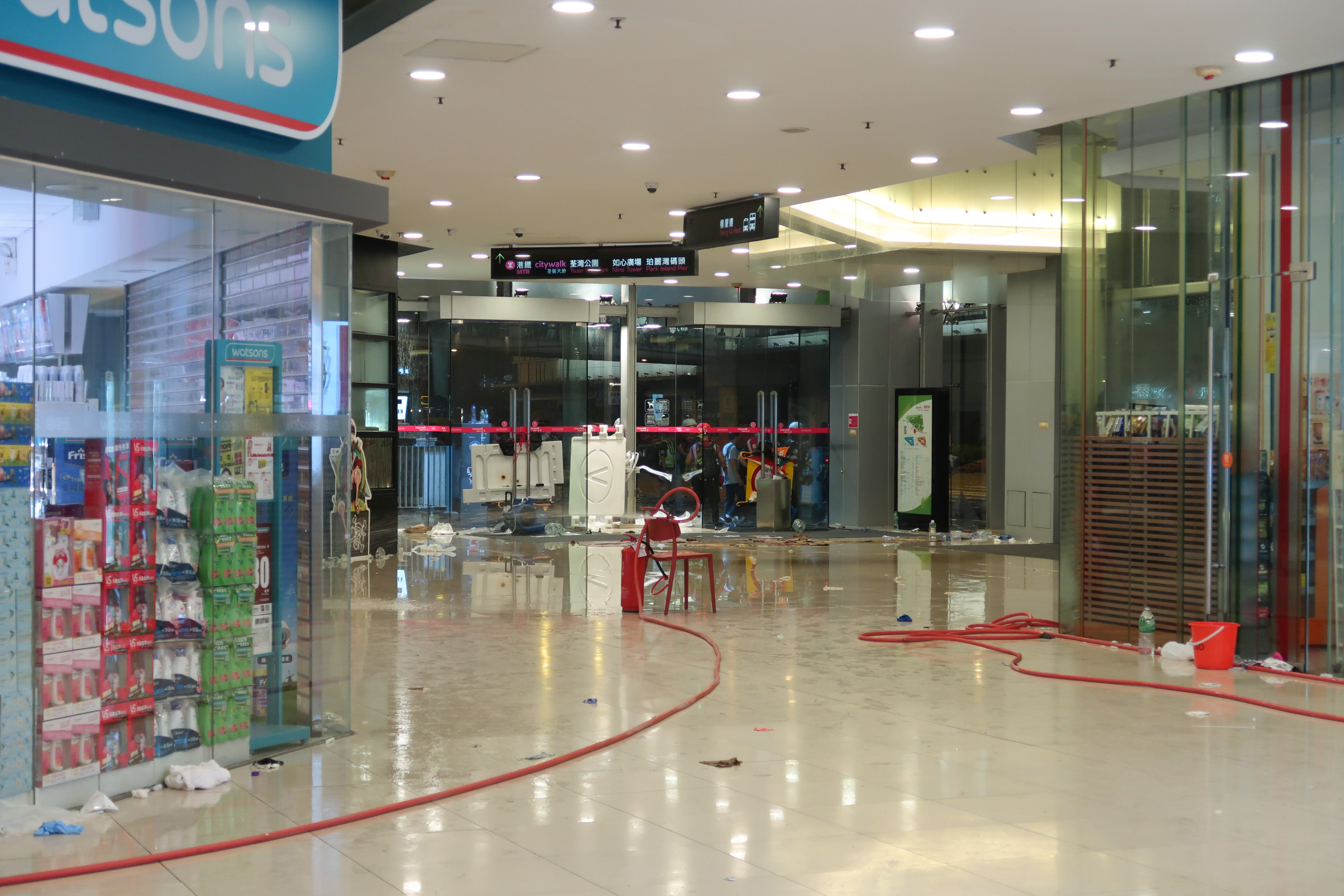
Protesters used fire hoses to wet the floor and lock the doors of the shopping mall in Citywalk Phase II.

=== Police-civilian confrontations ===
Following the dispersal of a protest march by police, confrontations broke out at around 8 p.m. between protesters and several police officers in Yi Pei Square (Tsuen Wan), where an earlier suspected attack by "Fujian gang" members had occurred. That evening, individuals dressed in black, carrying iron rods, claimed they were seeking revenge for assaulted "comrades." These individuals arrived at Yi Pei Square, repeatedly striking the iron gates of a mahjong parlor, eventually shattering the parlor's glass windows. They proceeded to Tai Pei Square, where they attacked the iron gate of an arcade center. Several other businesses in Yi Pei Square were also vandalized.

A group of demonstrators then moved to the intersection of Sha Tsui Road and Chung On Street, where they briefly attacked and damaged a police vehicle. A standoff ensued with about six officers in blue and white uniforms carrying round shields. Tensions escalated when demonstrators heard one officer refer to them as "cockroaches" over the radio, prompting demands for an explanation. Meanwhile, another group of demonstrators encircled the police officers, leading to a fierce confrontation. Several demonstrators at the front charged forward, using long bamboo poles and iron rods to attack approximately eight officers. The officers retreated briefly, but a gunshot was suddenly heard, prompting six officers to raise their firearms and point them at the demonstrators and the press corps in front of them. A middle-aged man dressed as a local resident suddenly spread his arms, positioning himself between the officers and demonstrators, and then knelt down, pleading, "Don't shoot!". He was subsequently kicked aside by an officer but stood back up, continuing to shield the crowd. The three officers who had drawn their firearms were then surrounded by a large number of journalists and citizens, eventually retreating into a rear stairwell at the nearby residential building Ming Yat House. The journalists on the scene questioned the officers about their actions, particularly why the man had been kicked and why firearms were pointed at the press.

At around 9 p.m., several dozen individuals wearing helmets and gloves, carrying the flag of the People's Republic of China, gathered in Tsuen Wan. They were later dispersed by riot police. Footage captured around 9:20 p.m. shows a group of individuals carrying iron rods, knives, and the national flag running through the intersection of Chung On Street and Sha Tsui Road, while nearby riot police appeared to ignore them.

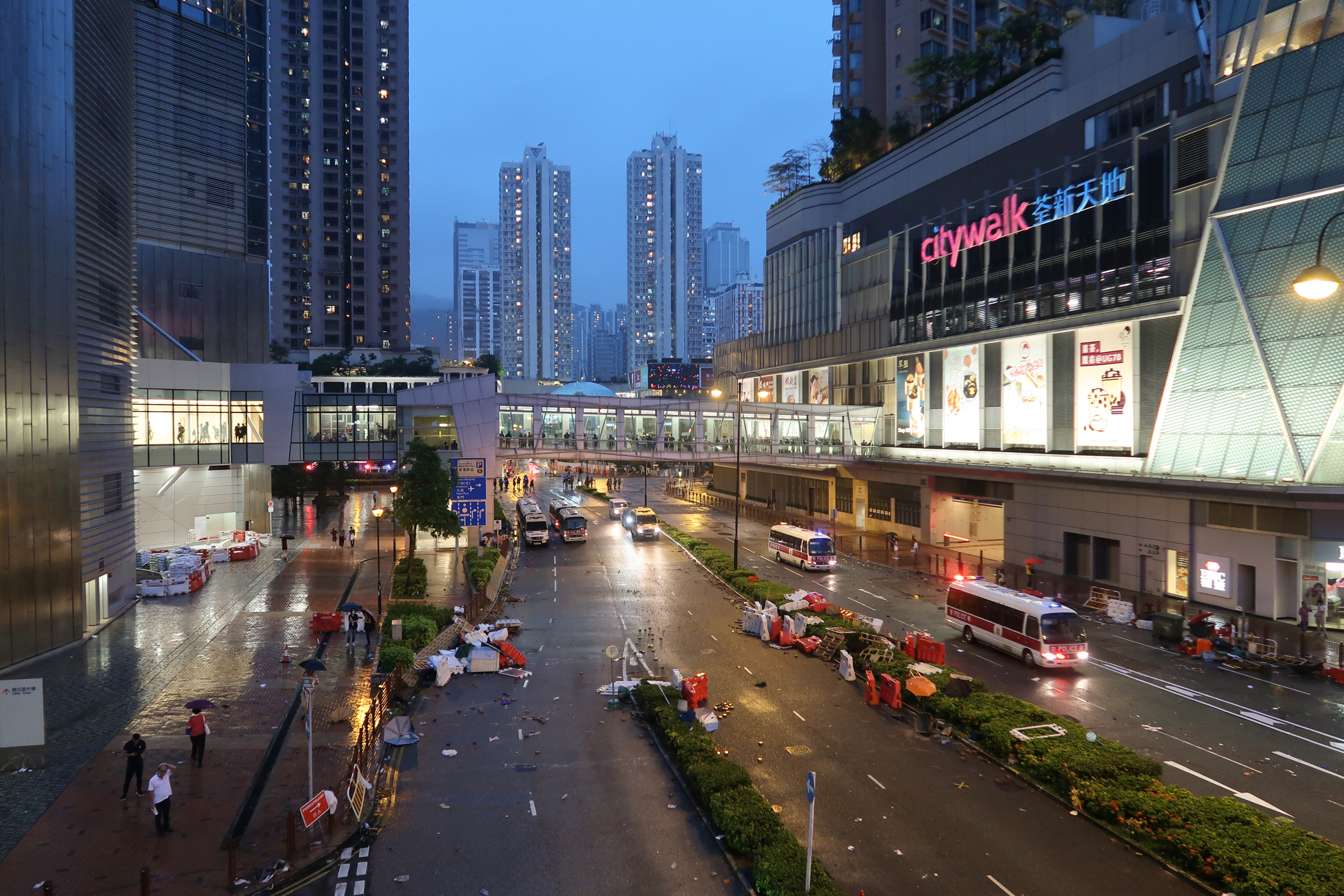
Yeung Uk Road after police clearance.

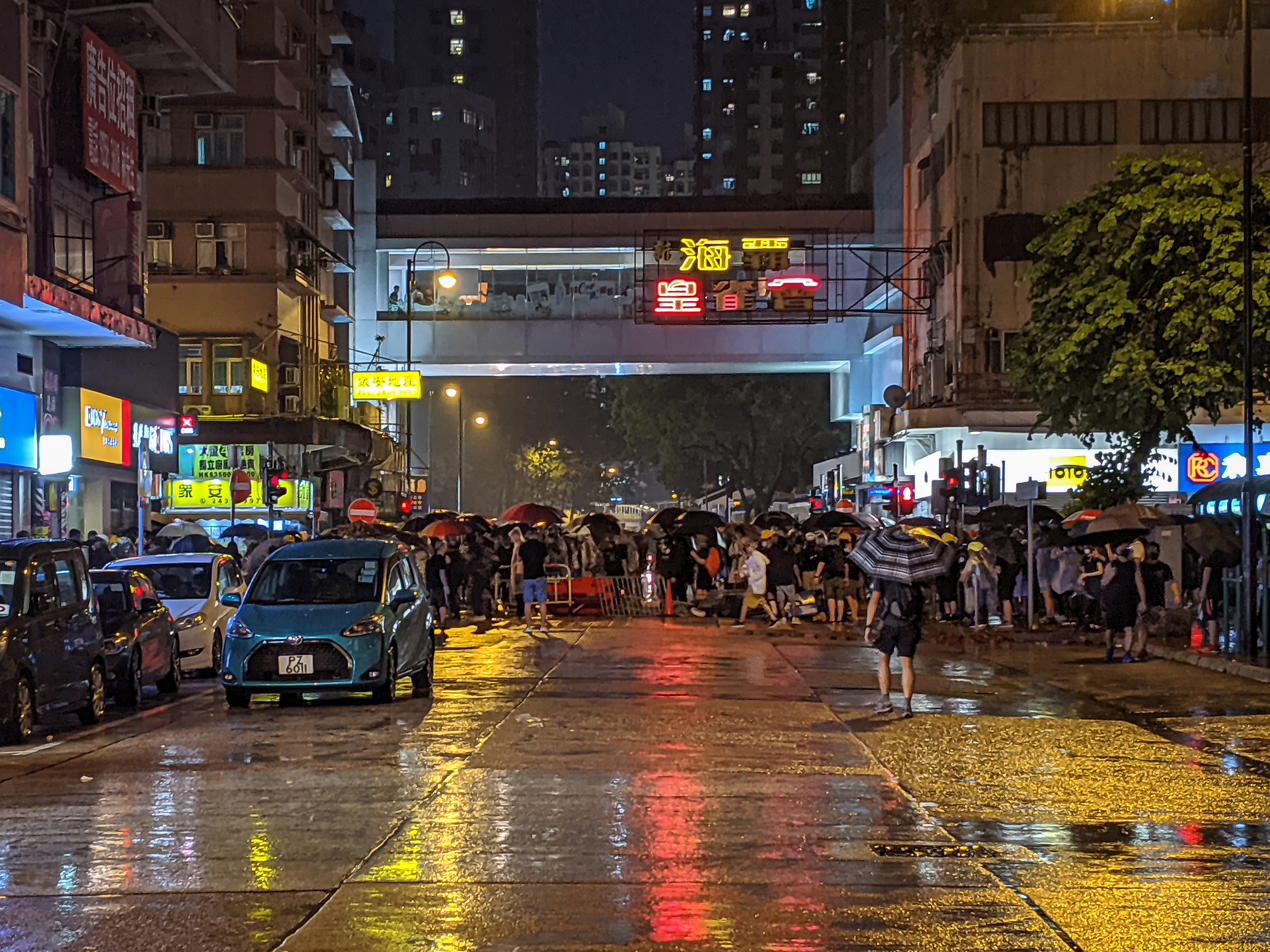
At 8 p.m., the protesters moved to Yi Pei Square of Tsuen Wan, where there had been a suspected attack by white-shirted individuals earlier in the day.

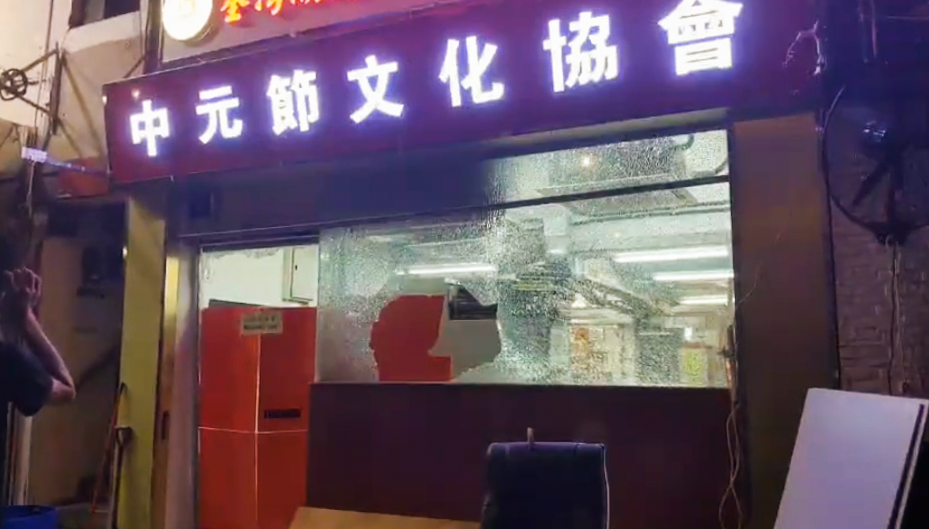
The glass of the Zhongyuan Festival Cultural Association in Yi Pei Square, Tsuen Wan, was smashed.

Protesters move to other areas

As night fell, some demonstrators relocated to other districts, including Sham Shui Po, Tsim Sha Tsui, and Wong Tai Sin South Mall. In Sham Shui Po, after demonstrators gathered in side streets, police raised blue flags near Apliu Street, near Dragon Centre, warning those present that they were participating in an unlawful assembly. Residents in the area shouted at the officers. At around 9:30 p.m., after demonstrators moved onto Cheung Sha Wan Road, riot police suddenly advanced, subduing a female demonstrator, which sparked outrage among the local community. Residents gathered outside the Sham Shui Po Police Station, demanding an explanation and using laser pointers to target the station, while police responded with searchlights. At 10 p.m., during heavy rain, riot police at the intersection of Yen Chow Street and Cheung Sha Wan Road subdued at least ten demonstrators and repeatedly used shields to push back reporters, ordering them to retreat. Police also stopped buses and private cars on Cheung Sha Wan Road and Yen Chow Street, raising blue flags.

In Tsim Sha Tsui, several dozen demonstrators vandalized traffic lights and used garbage cans and other debris to block roads at the intersection of Austin Road and Nathan Road. The toll plaza of the Cross-Harbour Tunnel also experienced a brief blockade, during which the demonstrators damaged toll booth facilities, allowing vehicles to pass through for free. Elsewhere, some demonstrators arrived at New Town Plaza in Sha Tin, where they were greeted with cheers from the public. Footage of this event received 240,000 views and over 6,000 shares on Facebook.

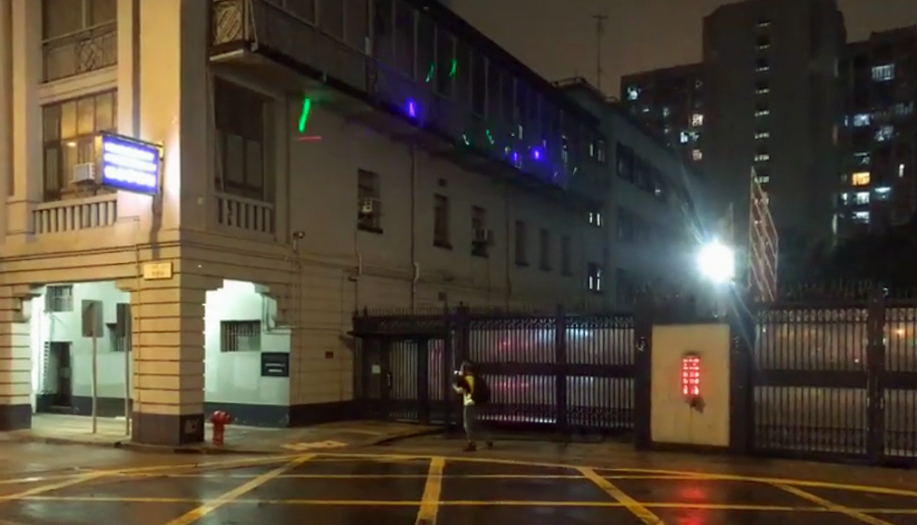
In the evening, someone shone a laser pointer at the Sham Shui Po police station and the police responded by shining a searchlight in the direction of Yen Chow Street.

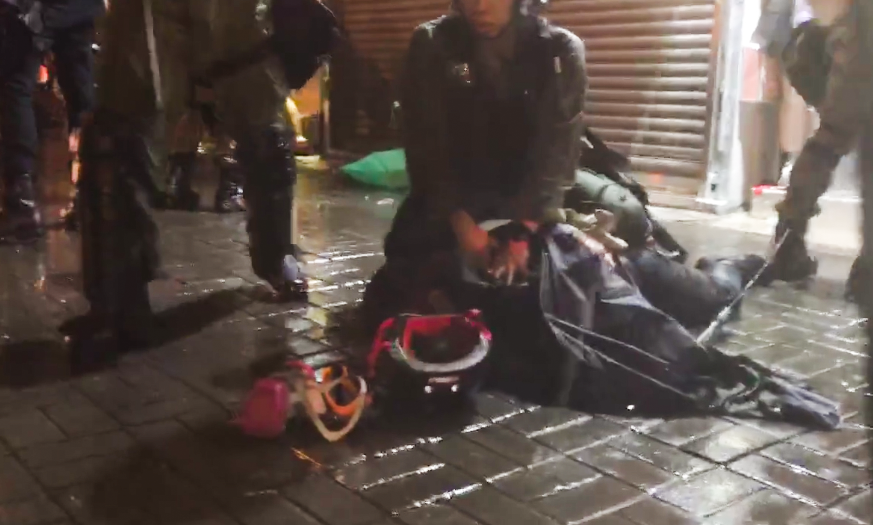
At 10 p.m., in heavy rain, riot police dispersed protesters on Yen Chow Street.

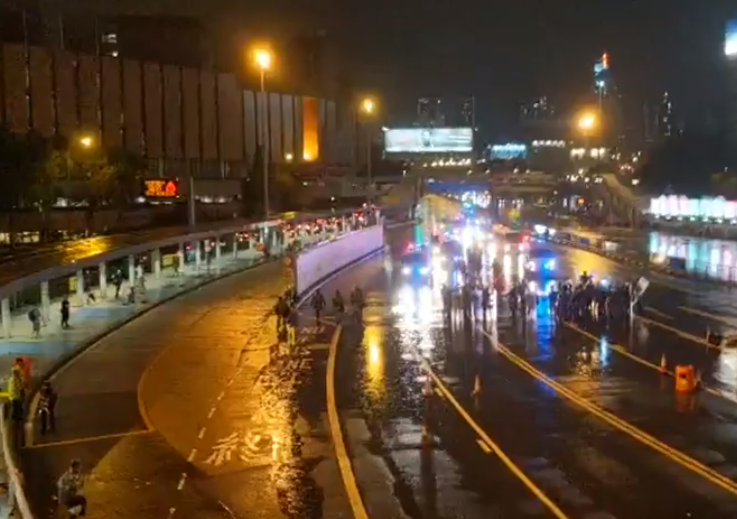
Protesters also staged a flash blockade at the Cross-Harbour Tunnel toll plaza, but the police quickly arrived to clear the scene.

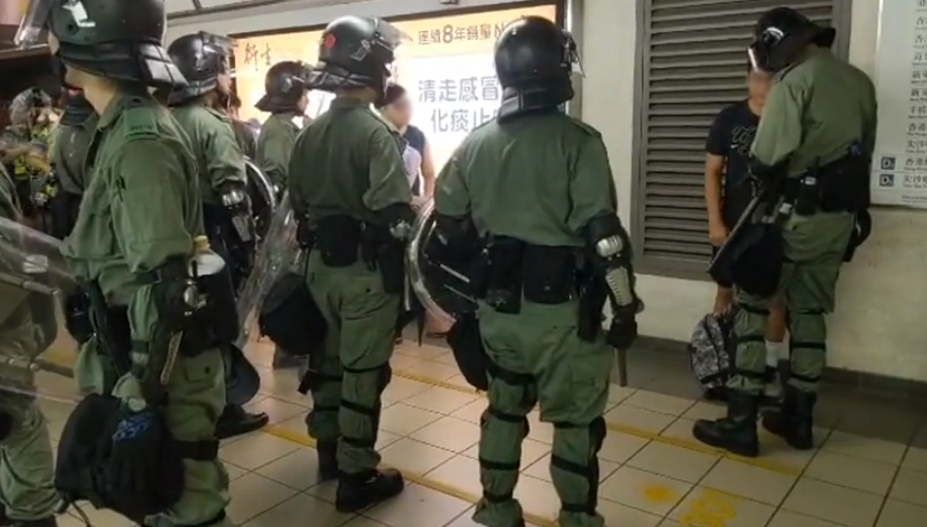
Several riot police officers checked young people at Hung Hom station.

== Consequences ==
=== Injuries, arrests and legal proceedings ===
The Hospital Authority reported that by noon on 26 August, a total of 41 people had been sent to four public hospital emergency departments following various clashes across the city, including 34 men and 7 women, with 15 of them in stable condition. Police reported that 15 officers were injured during operations.

Police arrested 36 individuals aged between 12 and 48, on charges of unlawful assembly, possession of offensive weapons, and assaulting police officers. Among those arrested was an assistant to Tsuen Wan District Councillor Roy Tam from the Neo Democrats, who was detained and bloodied by police while filming at Kwai Fong Station. Police also arrested a 12-year-old boy, a prospective Form 1 student at Lingnan Hang Yee Memorial Secondary School, who became the youngest person to be arrested during the anti-extradition bill protests at that time.

Outside the Sham Shui Po Police Station, a 19-year-old male student was arrested and found in possession of protective gear and two laser pointers. The defendant admitted to participating in the demonstrations on Yeung Uk Road in Tsuen Wan. Although the defense argued that the case had caused the defendant to suspend his studies, preventing him from achieving his dream of becoming a paramedic, the District Court judge only considered the defendant's age as a mitigating factor. The judge emphasized the need for a deterrent sentence, given the numerous public order disturbances and violent incidents Hong Kong had experienced from June to October of the previous year, concluding that imprisonment was the only appropriate punishment. The judge rejected the notion that the defendant acted impulsively or was unable to flee the scene. The judge set a six-year sentence as the starting point, reducing it by one-third for the guilty plea, resulting in a four-year prison sentence.

=== Arrest of 12-year-old boy ===
During the clearance operation at around 7 p.m., riot police surrounded a boy near Yeung Uk Road, binding his hands with zip ties and ordering him to squat down, resulting in elbow abrasions and bleeding. A social worker on the scene shouted that the boy was under 16 and demanded to assist him, advising the boy to state his personal information and reminding him of his rights as a detainee. Police officers claimed this might constitute "obstruction of justice." When reporters approached for interviews, they were scolded and threatened with batons by police officers. After repeated questioning, riot police refused to disclose the reason for the arrest, suggesting reporters inquire with the police public relations department. The boy was then taken away in a white private car, revealing to those present that he was 12 years old. Later, Hong Kong 01 learned that the boy was arrested for "unlawful assembly" and had contacted his parents and lawyer. His family arrived at the police station around 8 p.m., accompanying him during the recording of his statement. The boy was reported to have a medical condition unrelated to the protest activities and was later hospitalized. He was released on bail pending further investigation and allowed to return home on the evening of 26 August. On 27 August, police stated that he would be required to report to the police station in late September.

Lingnan Hang Yee Memorial Secondary School later confirmed twice, through Deputy Principal Kwok-kong and a statement issued on 27 August, that the boy was a newly enrolled Form 1 student at the school. Kwok-kong and the statement both mentioned that the school had contacted the boy's parents and would provide support services from a school social worker, as well as express care and offer emotional counseling to students attending the Form 1 bridging course. The 27 August statement also clarified that false rumors had been spread on online forums, claiming the student had received a demerit. However, the school's teachers had never mentioned any punishment, focusing instead on the student's welfare and counseling.

=== 51-year-old sentenced to jail ===
A 51-year-old domestic helper knelt in front of the police line on Kwu Hang Road in Tsuen Wan and emotionally shouted criticism of the police's enforcement action. She was later charged with two counts of assaulting a police officer and one count of obstructing a police officer in the discharge of his duty after she allegedly attacked a male officer and then punched a female officer in the face during her arrest. Although the defence argued that she had lost her husband and suffered from eye disease and emotional problems as a result of the police's use of tear gas, the presiding judge, Lo Tak-chuen, deemed the case more serious than similar cases. CCTV footage showed the defendant attacking the officers. The judge also noted that advances in communication technology had allowed more people to gather, making the situation worse. She was eventually sentenced to three months' imprisonment.

=== Yeung Uk Road illegal assembly case ===
Seven people, five men and two women, were charged with participating in an illegal assembly at Yeung Uk Road in Tsuen Wan. Of the six defendants, one pleaded guilty and the remaining five pleaded not guilty. A 25-year-old man was accused of assaulting an inspector with a long object. He later pleaded guilty to charges of illegal assembly and assaulting a police officer. Despite the defence's claims that a conviction would force him to resign from his teaching post, the acting chief judge, Lo Tak-chuen, pointed out that the defendant had chosen to take part in the march despite the presence of serious violence, and sentenced him to ten months' imprisonment with deductions on 7 January 2022. Another defendant, a 21-year-old Chinese University student, pleaded guilty to the charge of illegal assembly. Magistrate Cheng Nim-chi found that even if he had participated in a lawful march, his clothing—consisting of a helmet, goggles and a gas mask—indicated prior knowledge of the illegal status of the assembly. The judge also stated that the defence's claim that he was only holding a brick as a bluff, without throwing it, was still a serious accusation. In light of the guilty plea and the defendant's background, he was sentenced to eight months in prison.

The trial of the remaining five defendants who pleaded not guilty began in early June 2022, with the defence claiming that one defendant had suffered a head injury during the arrest. The testifying officers admitted to using a baton, but denied using force, stating that they did not witness any officers using excessive force. However, they admitted that CCTV footage provided by the defence did not show a confrontation. On 24 August, Judge Lee Chi-ho ruled that the defendants' equipment and clothing, as well as the circumstances of their arrest, established their guilt. He said that if they were sentenced to prison, the sentence would not be short. Sentencing was originally scheduled for 14 September at the West Kowloon Magistrates' Court, but three of the defendants were unable to attend due to COVID-19 infection and quarantine, leaving only two present. The defence revealed that one defendant had previously applied for a review of his conviction. Although some of the defendants wished to proceed with sentencing, Magistrate Lee preferred to resolve all matters together and postponed sentencing until 6 October, with the five defendants remaining in custody.

On 6 October, the judge stated that the two defendants' culpability was "not significantly different" and that there were no grounds for a reduced sentence. They were both sentenced to eleven months in prison, while one of the female defendants, Su Fai-ching, had already been sentenced to four years and eleven months for her involvement in the Chinese University bridge incident, making her eligible for an additional eight months. The remaining three male defendants were unable to appear in court and were due to be sentenced on 19 October. On the day of the verdict, the defence argued that there was no evidence that the defendants had engaged in violent behaviour. One male defendant even claimed that the case had caused him severe stress, leading to endocrine disorders and diabetes. The defence also mentioned delays in the prosecution and asked for leniency. However, Magistrate Lee found that even without evidence of extreme violence, the ongoing social unrest at the time meant that each defendant's culpability was similar. Ultimately, the three male defendants were sentenced to eleven months, approximately one year.

=== Yeung Uk Road riot ===
A 28-year-old unemployed man was charged with participating in a riot at the junction of Yeung Uk Road and Wat Dee Street in Tsuen Wan. The case was referred to the District Court for a first hearing on 26 July, which was adjourned to 20 September for further hearing. The defendant was granted further bail. The defendant also allegedly participated in riots at New City Plaza in Sha Tin and near Wong Tai Sin Temple in Lung Cheung Road on 14 July and 5 August 2019.

=== Wing Shun Street abattoir riot case ===
Six men and two women, aged between 24 and 44, including civil servants, were arrested outside the slaughterhouse in Yong Shun Street, Kwai Chung. Two years later, on 17 December 2021, they were charged with conspiracy to riot at the same location, along with four other men. Six of them were charged with possession of offensive weapons. One defendant had previously been sentenced to seven years for attempted robbery and two others for a flying kick at riot police during the "18 Districts" incident on 13 October. The Prosecutor's Office said it would coordinate with the Correctional Services Department to possibly bring the defendants together for trial. Some of the defendants had already fled.

=== Social worker cleared of obstructing police ===
A 22-year-old social worker was charged with obstructing a police officer and failing to produce proof of her identity (identity card) on demand at the intersection of Market Street and Chung On Street in Tsuen Wan. When asked by a female riot police inspector to show her ID, the social worker repeatedly asked the inspector to show her warrant card first. On 17 September 2020, the presiding judge, Wong Nga-yan, ruled that the 43 seconds it took for the social worker to retrieve her ID was a reasonable time. Furthermore, according to police guidelines, uniformed officers cannot refuse to show their warrant cards when requested by members of the public. As a result, all charges against the social worker were dismissed and the court granted her application for legal costs. Upon hearing of her acquittal, the defendant told the court that it was a just result. In 2022, the Ministry of Justice appealed the case, arguing that the magistrate's decision that the social worker's behaviour did not constitute obstruction was wrong in law. The appeal was heard in the High Court on 4 August, with the social worker present. The Department of Justice claimed that the original court had failed to take sufficient account of the social context, emphasising that the social worker had argued with the inspector for almost a minute and had failed to deal with the presence of over a hundred members of the public nearby, which was in line with the legal definition of 'obstruction'. During the hearing, Judge Wong Chong-ho questioned whether the police had the right to check people's ID cards when citizens could also ask police officers to show their warrant cards, noting that people stopped would want to know the identity of the officers. After hearing arguments from both sides, the court reserved judgment until 14 September. On that date, Judge Wong ruled that the social worker's actions constituted obstruction and criticised the original judge's view that uniformed police officers were not required to show their warrant cards, stating that it reflected a misunderstanding of police regulations. The judge noted that the previous ruling's conclusion that the social worker had complied with the requirement to produce identification was "illogical" and constituted an error of law. As the original court had not clearly determined whether the officers had acted lawfully, the judge ordered that the case be sent back to the original judge for clarification on this point and to reconsider the possibility of a conviction.

=== Sham Shui Po illegal assembly case ===
Ten protesters aged between 17 and 23 were charged and one pleaded guilty in mid-April 2020, seven months after they allegedly took part in an illegal assembly in Sham Shui Po. The defence lawyer revealed that three defendants had allegedly suffered head injuries and broken bones as a result of police violence during their detention in a police van and at the police station. One defendant requested to be taken to hospital, but was initially ignored by the police, and was only taken to hospital after a lawyer intervened, requiring seven to eight stitches.

At the end of the trial, four of the nine remaining defendants were found guilty and five were acquitted. On 7 March 2002, District Court Judge Lee Hing-nin found that although no police officers were injured and no tear gas was used during the incident, the demonstrators occupied large parts of Cheung Sha Wan and Kin Chiu streets for about 77 minutes and one civilian was injured. As a result, three defendants were sentenced to six months' imprisonment, while the defendant who pleaded guilty was sentenced to four months' imprisonment. A 17-year-old student was sentenced to a rehabilitation centre.

=== Other cases ===
Three defendants, aged 21, 23 and 24, were charged with participating in an illegal assembly near Chung On Street and Sha Tsui Road in Tsuen Wan. The 24-year-old defendant was also charged with possession of a laser device, which is classified as possession of an offensive weapon in a public place. After a trial, on 27 July 2022, Kwun Tong Court judge Kwan Lai-wan noted that although the officers' accounts varied, details such as lighting conditions suggested that the accounts were generally consistent. The defence argued that CCTV footage from the scene did not show two of the defendants taking part in the gathering, but this was rejected by the judge, who considered that the footage was only corroborative evidence and could not independently discredit the officers' observations. In addition, the location where the defendants were stopped was within the protesters' escape route and their clothing closely resembled that of the protesters, leading the judge to conclude that the accumulated circumstantial evidence was sufficient to rule out the possibility that the defendants were merely passing by. As a result, all charges against the three defendants were upheld and they were remanded in custody for sentencing on 10 August. On the day of sentencing, Judge Kwan noted that the assembly was substantial and that the defendants had verbally abused police officers and possessed high-powered laser pointers, indicating their active participation in the illegal assembly. The defendants were sentenced to four to five months in prison, while the third defendant was sent to a rehabilitation centre. The first and third defendants were granted bail of HK$20,000 pending appeal.

A 21-year-old Chinese University student was charged with assaulting police officer Chan King-cheung outside Hong Kong Telecom 1010 at the junction of Market Complex and Chung On Street in Tsuen Wan. He appeared before the West Kowloon Magistrates' Court on 27 August 2019, where Chief Magistrate Lo Tak-chuen granted him bail of HK$5,000 and imposed a curfew from midnight to 6 a.m., during which he was prohibited from leaving Hong Kong. The case was adjourned until 22 October for further hearing.

== Police controversy ==
=== Road closure ===
Following the "Ignite Hong Kong - Awakening the Public" march in Kwun Tong on 24 August, the MTR again closed several stations, leading to public discontent. In addition, police cordoned off roads around Yeung Uk Road near Tsuen Wan Park, preventing buses from entering or leaving Tsuen Wan. Legislative Councillor Andrew Wan criticised the police for deliberately arranging this to trap the marchers, describing their actions as 'extremely despicable'.

=== Citizens dragged to the ground ===
At around 8 p.m., a passer-by on Tai Wo Hau Road saw police chasing a civilian and approached to ask, "Is this violence really necessary?" (Note: The original phrase is "唔需要咁暴力呀?", which is a Cantonese colloquial expression.) And after the riot police asked him, "Are you related to them?", (Note: The original phrase is "你關唔關事?", which is a colloquial expression in Cantonese.) they dragged him to the ground and conducted a body search, resulting in an injury to his arm. The police took down his address and phone number, but refused to show their badges or identification, leading to accusations of police brutality.

=== Riot police storm shopping centre to make arrests ===
Around 10 p.m., some protesters moved to Wong Tai Sin. The riot police received information that they were changing clothes in Wong Tai Sin Plaza and decided to storm the mall to make arrests, stopping members of the public and forcing some to kneel. The actions of the police drew the ire of local residents, who demanded that the riot police leave and release the detainees, who were eventually released. On the evening of 26 August, dozens of members of the public surrounded the information desk in the shopping centre, demanding explanations from the staff. Employees reported feeling unwell and were taken to hospital by paramedics. Meanwhile, members of the public covered the walls with sticky notes, damaged the information desk's computer and removed and destroyed documents from the drawers.

== Impact ==
=== Transport ===
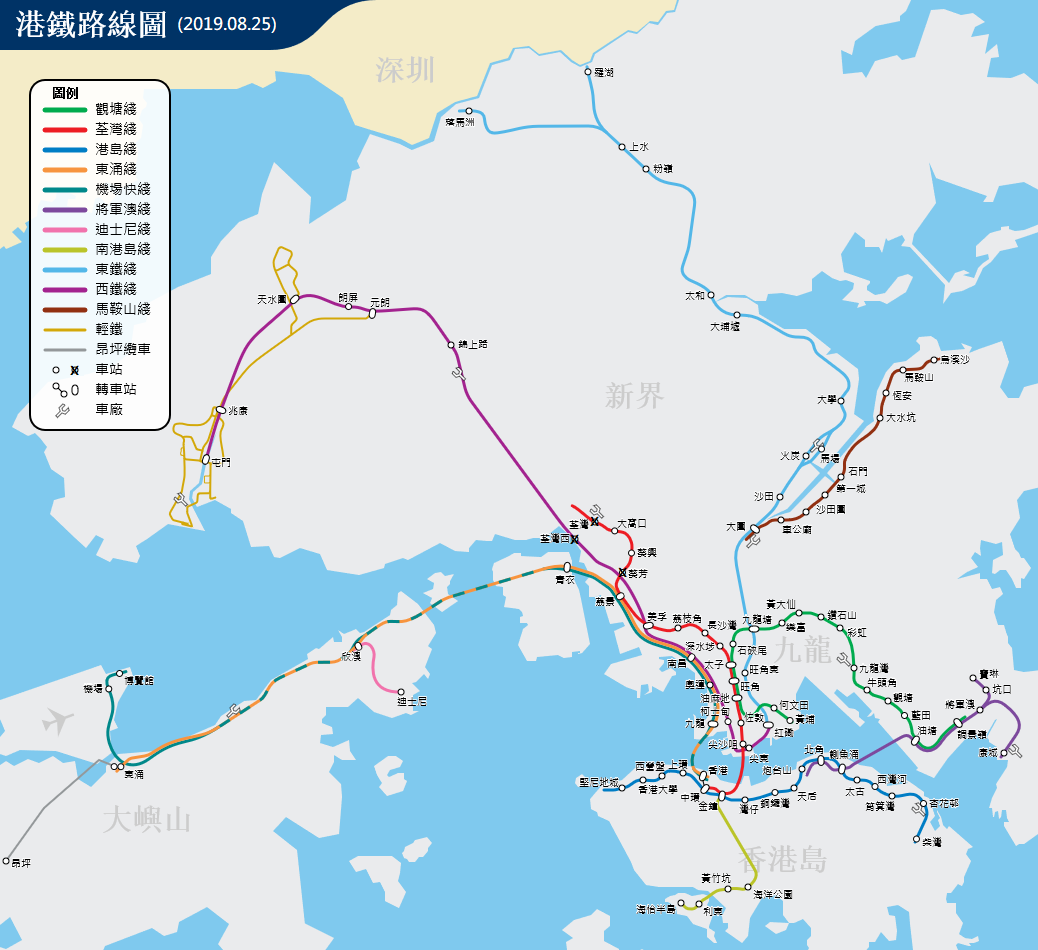
Stations marked with an "x" indicate those that were closed due to the protest.

On the morning of the protest, at around 11:30 a.m., the MTR announced that several stations would be temporarily closed from 1:30 p.m. until further notice to ensure the safety of passengers and staff. These stations included Kwai Fong and Tsuen Wan stations on the Tsuen Wan Line and Tsuen Wan West station on the West Rail Line. Trains on the Tsuen Wan Line bypassed Kwai Fong and Tsuen Wan stations and terminated at Tai Wo Hau station, while trains on the West Rail Line bypassed Tsuen Wan West station. The situation was chaotic during the station closures, especially at Kwai Fong station, where a large number of police arrived at around 1 p.m. They chased reporters out of the station before closing the station gates. During this time, there were heated arguments between police officers and reporters, including some physical altercations. Several bus routes passing through the protest areas had to be re-routed, and over 50 bus routes operated by Kowloon Motor Bus were gradually suspended after protesters occupied several roads in the area and deviated from the planned protest route.

MTR station closures

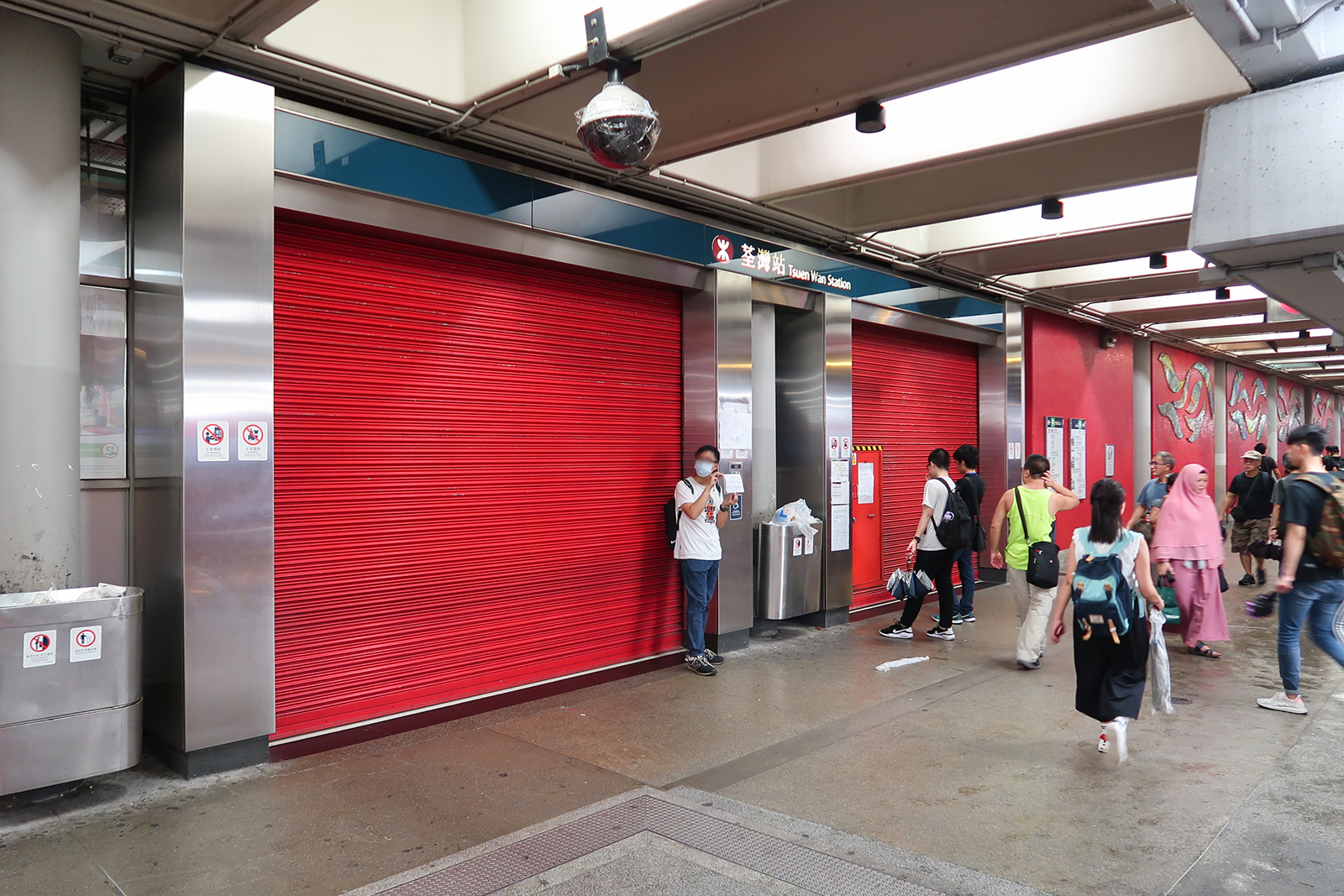
Tsuen Wan Station Exit A closed in response to protests.

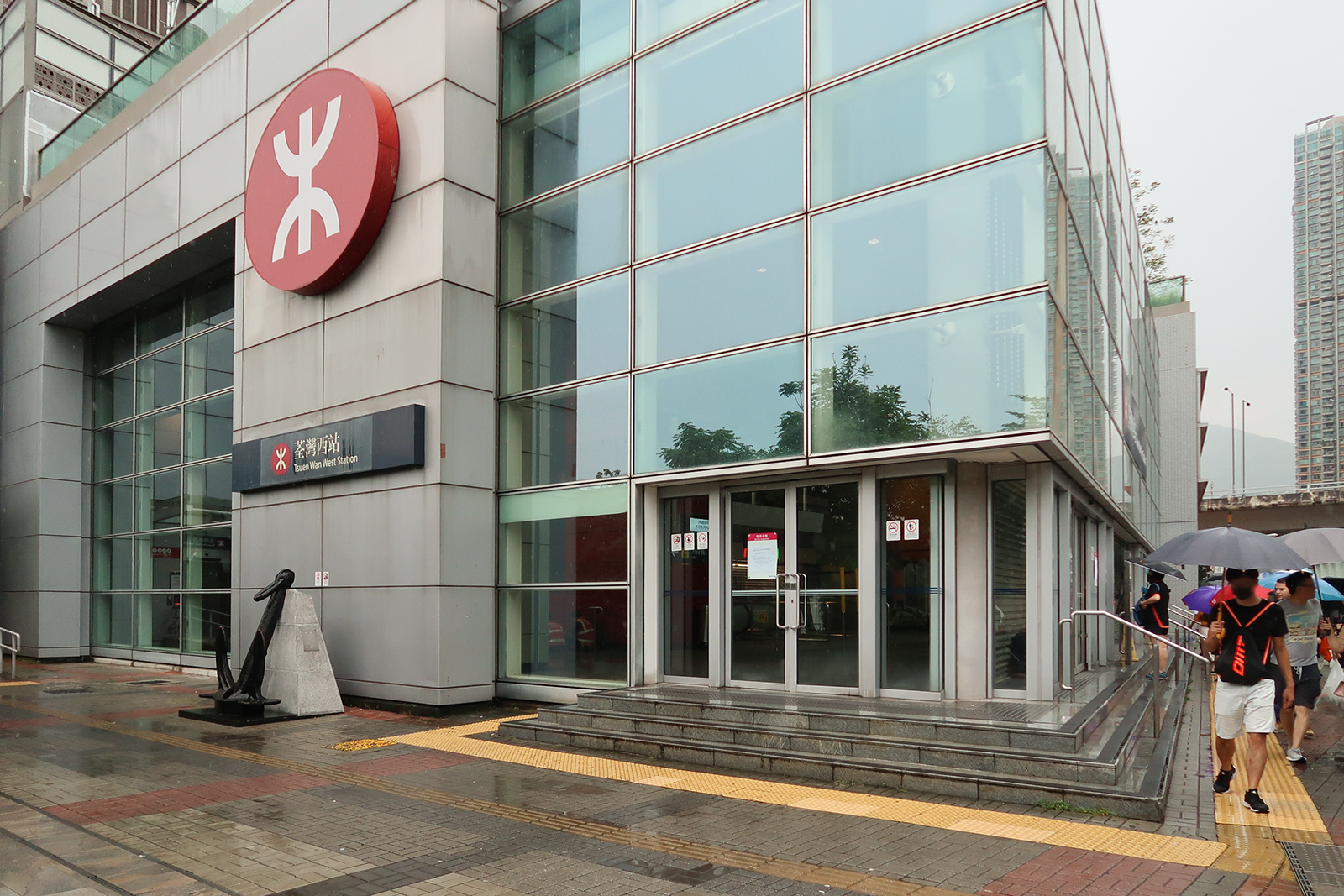
Tsuen Wan West Station closed in response to protests.

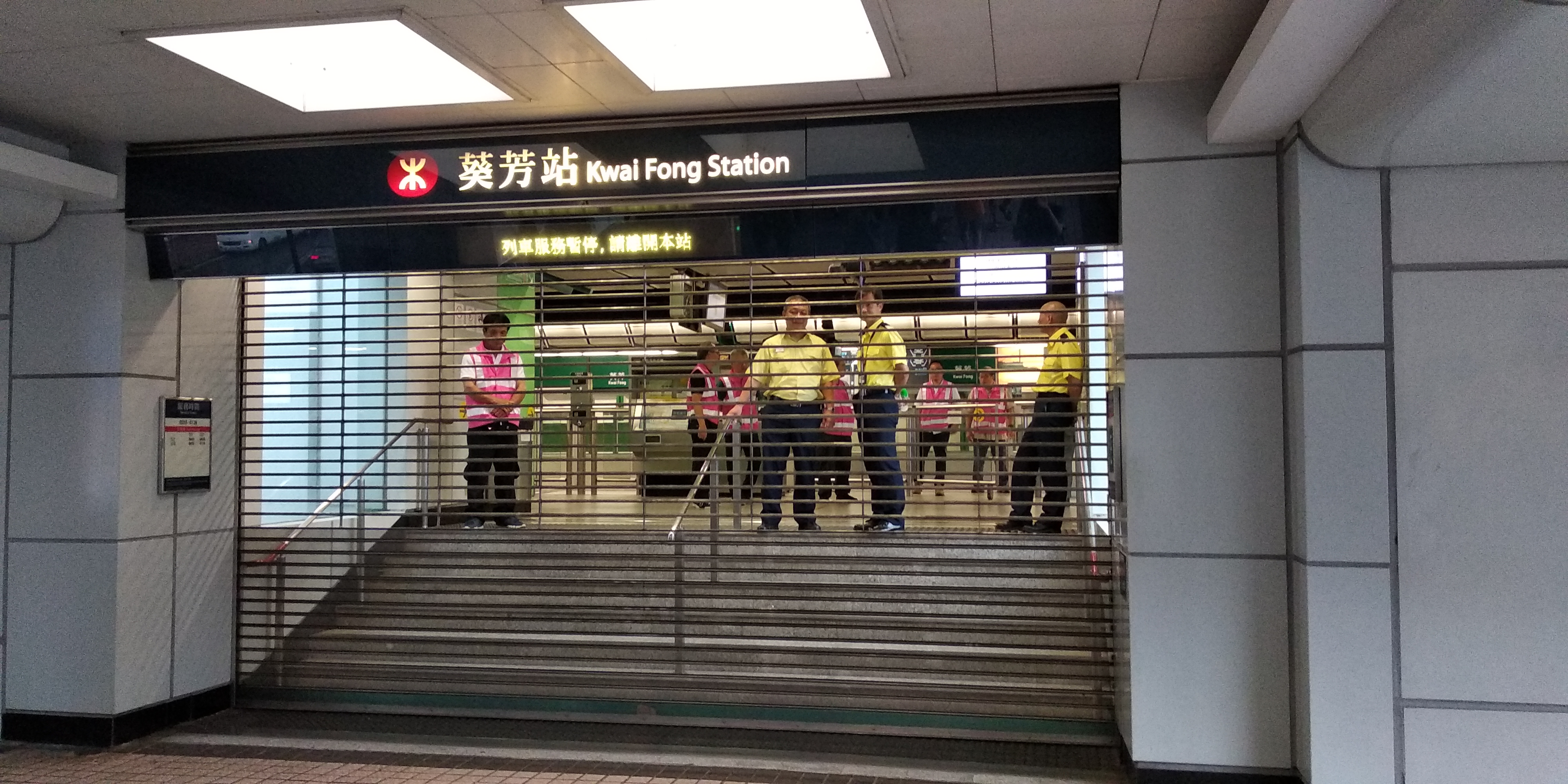
Kwai Fong Station Exit E closed in response to the protests.

=== Recreational facilities ===
In response to the protests, the Leisure and Cultural Services Department announced on 24 August that several facilities would close early at 2 p.m. on 25 August. These included Tsuen Wan Park, Tsuen Wan Waterfront Park, Sha Tsui Road Playground Tennis Courts, Tsuen Wan Sports Centre, Yeung Uk Road Sports Centre, Wai Tsuen Sports Centre, Tsuen King Circuit Sports Centre, Tsuen Wan Town Hall and Tsuen Wan Public Library.

=== Protesters ===
In the aftermath of the protest, the intensified clashes between the police and the public led to the emergence of several radical organisations among the opposition demonstrators. One notable group, the "Dragon Slaying Brigade", was formally established during these clashes with the aim of creating an armed balance between the protesters and the police. These radical organisations later played a role in a number of significant cases involving firearms, ammunition and bombs.

== Responses and reactions ==
=== Protesters and organizers ===
Due to the closure of stations near large-scale protests by the MTR for two consecutive days, some protesters decided to leave early from Tsuen Wan to Kwai Fong, expressing their belief to Ming Pao that the station closures were an intentional attempt by the MTR to obstruct those wishing to participate in the protest. The protest organizer, Yu Ngai-ming, also condemned the MTR for disregarding public interest by arbitrarily closing stations, making it difficult for citizens to leave.

=== Pro-Democracy Party ===
The Neo Democrats issued a statement on the evening of the protest, strongly protesting the unjust detention and rough treatment of a legislative assistant by the police, asserting that the assistant was merely filming with a mobile phone and did not engage in any other actions. The Neo Democrats also strongly condemned the MTR for disregarding passenger safety and ignoring the possible illegal detention incident within the station. They demanded that the MTR provide a full explanation and seek justice for the assistant.

=== Pro-Establishment Party ===
The Democratic Alliance for the Betterment and Progress of Hong Kong held a press conference on 26 August, strongly condemning the actions of radical protesters. Chairperson Starry Lee stated that the weapons used by protesters were becoming increasingly lethal and could lead to fatalities if not stopped. She expressed firm support for strict law enforcement by the police to restore order as soon as possible. Legislative Council member and Tsuen Wan District Council member Ben Chan criticized the protesters for deviating from the planned protest route, throwing petrol bombs, and vandalizing shops in Yi Pei Square, actions that he deemed condemnable. He emphasized the need to dissociate from violence, cautioning against romanticizing peaceful protests as a cover for violent acts. Gary Chan, Chairperson of the Legislative Council Security Panel, also pointed out that the level of violence among protesters had escalated significantly, with some wielding long wooden sticks. He supported the increased use of water cannons by the police as an effective means to separate protesters from the police and ensure the safety of frontline officers. He emphasized that the deployment of water cannons was done under strict guidelines, considering it a feasible and effective solution.

The Hong Kong Business and Professionals Alliance also issued a statement on the same day, stating that Hong Kong was at a highly dangerous juncture, and if illegal violence was not curbed, it could lead to casualties and the destruction of the rule of law, jeopardizing Hong Kong's prosperity. They urged the government to quickly formulate response measures, firmly stop the violence and chaos, and strongly support strict law enforcement by the police to bring the "rioters" to justice. The Alliance called on Hong Kong citizens to recognize the severe damage that extreme violence inflicts on society, collectively reject and resist violence, maintain social order, and protect the hard-earned reputation of Hong Kong as the "Pearl of the Orient."

=== Government ===
The Hong Kong Special Administrative Region Government issued a statement in the early hours of the day following the protest, condemning the protesters for attacking police officers with bricks, iron rods, and repeatedly throwing petrol bombs at police vehicles and officers. The statement also mentioned that some protesters had taken down the national flag of the People's Republic of China at Kwai Chung Sports Ground and desecrated it, an act that challenged national authority and violated the National Flag and National Emblem Ordinance.

=== Hong Kong Police Force ===
The police held a press conference in the early hours of the day following the protest, where Senior Superintendent of the Police Public Relations Branch, Yu Hoi-kwan, played a video showing a police officer firing a warning shot into the air. The video depicted several protesters vandalizing a police vehicle before attacking the officers who exited the vehicle. In response, six officers drew their firearms, and one fired a shot into the air as a warning. Yu stated that the officer's action was to protect himself, and that no one was injured by the shot. Yu described the officers as "brave and restrained," and their use of force as "necessary and reasonable" for quelling the riot. Yu referred to the protesters as "extremely violent rioters" who had "exceeded the boundaries of what is acceptable in a civilized society." She also confirmed that five officers were injured and hospitalized, and that uniformed officers had discharged their firearms, with the intention of protecting their own safety.

On the night of the protest, an elderly man stood between the police and protesters with his arms outstretched, later kneeling and pleading, "Don't shoot!". (Note: The original phrase is "唔好呀！", which is a Cantonese colloquial expression.) However, he was kicked aside by an officer. At the press conference, Yu described this as a "natural reaction" from the officer. In a routine press conference on 26 August, the police stated that the officer had perceived the kneeling man as a "threat" and reiterated that kicking him aside was a "natural reaction," without malice and very reasonable. Regarding the incident of officers pointing firearms at journalists, Yu explained that it was because someone behind the journalists was throwing bricks.

== Aftermath ==
During the protest, police fired multiple tear gas canisters outside the Yeung Uk Road Market. Professor David Hui Shu-cheong, Chair of Respiratory Medicine at the Chinese University of Hong Kong, warned that food in the shops could have been contaminated by the residue from the tear gas, potentially causing diarrhea and gastrointestinal discomfort. The following day, about ten citizens voluntarily cleaned the market, using mops, towels, soapy water, and baking soda to wash the walls and floors. This cleaning effort was initiated by Adrian Lau Cheuk-yu. On the same evening of the protest, the Food and Environmental Hygiene Department also sent outsourced cleaners for a thorough cleaning, though they were only provided with basic surgical masks, and most did not have any protective gear. The Hong Kong Confederation of Trade Unions criticized the department for violating the Occupational Safety and Health Ordinance and filed a complaint with the Labour Department.

After the protest, some people found tear gas canisters and rubber bullet casings on the road outside Yeung Uk Road, which they hung on the railings of the Lennon Wall footbridge outside Tsuen Wan Station. The items displayed included eight tear gas canisters, four rubber bullet casings, and several spent tear gas rounds. Posters detailing the harmful effects of tear gas on the human body were also attached to the railings. Contrary to rumors that the manufacturing dates on the tear gas canisters had been scraped off, the canisters on display had manufacturing dates ranging from 2016 to 2017. The casings still emitted the odor of tear gas, and passersby occasionally stopped to observe the display. This public display of tear gas canisters was reminiscent of the 5 August 2019 Hong Kong General Strike, where 106 tear gas canisters found in Tai Po were strung together and displayed on a pedestrian footbridge above the conflict site.
