= Dragon Slaying Brigade =

Group of protesters in Hong Kong

- Dates active: 25 August 2019 – 23 August 2020

Chinese name
- Traditional Chinese: 屠龍小隊
Transcriptions
Yue: Cantonese
- Jyutping: tou^{4} lung^{4} siu^{2} deoi^{6}

The Dragon Slaying Brigade (Chinese: 屠龍小隊) was a group of valiant protesters formed amid the 2019–2020 protests in Hong Kong. The group's name was derived from its target, the Special Tactical Contingent of the Hong Kong Police Force, nicknamed the "Velociraptor Contingent" or “Raptors” (速龍小隊). The Chinese characters for Velociraptor, 速龍, literally mean "swift dragon".

In its first public statement, it claimed responsibility for attacks on 25 August 2019 against Pro-Beijing businesses. Most of its members were arrested in 2020 (including one of the Hong Kong 12), while a few others fled to Taiwan.

== See also ==
- Special Tactical Contingent (Raptors)
- Controversies of the Hong Kong Police Force
- Fujianese organized crime
