= David Hui =

Hong Kong physician and epidemiologist

David Hui Shu-cheong
- 許樹昌
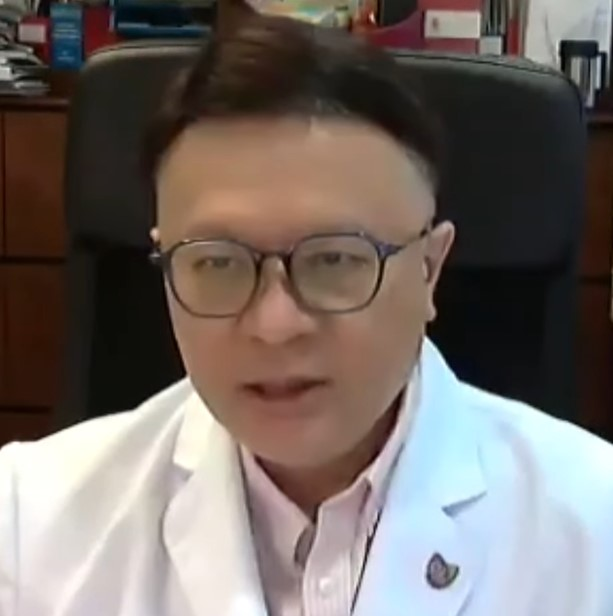
- Hui in 2022
- Education: University of New South Wales
- Relatives: Ron Hui Shu-yuen (brother)

David Hui Shu-cheong (Chinese: 許樹昌), is a Hong Kong infectious disease scholar, he is currently the Head of the Department of Medicine and Pharmacotherapy at the Chinese University of Hong Kong.

== Background ==
Hui grew up in Kowloon in his early years, has two brothers and one sister. He graduated from St. Paul's College Form 5 in 1978 and went on to study Form 6 in the same school. At that time, the Australian government implemented the "Colombo Plan" to subsidize Asian students to study free of charge in Australia. He was awarded a scholarship and transferred to Australia to study in grade 12. After graduation, he completed a five-year medical degree at the University of New South Wales and officially started practicing medicine in 1985.

During the SARS outbreak in Hong Kong in 2003, Hui was the head of the Respiratory Department of the Department of Internal Medicine at the Prince of Wales Hospital, and was involved in the treatment, research and rehabilitation of SARS patients.

=== COVID-19 ===
During the COVID-19 outbreak in 2020, Hui, cooperate with Gabriel Leung and Yuen Kwok-yung, provided the government with anti-epidemic strategies and measures.In September of the same year, the government implemented universal testing; Hui believed that if only more than one million people participated in the testing in the end, it might not be enough.On December 23, Hui believed that the British variant virus was only a small genetic mutation and would not affect the efficacy of the Vaccine.

==== Against Steaming Masks ====
On January 29, 2020, Ann Chiang Lai-wan posted a clip from Guangzhou Radio and Television Station on her personal Facebook page, suggesting that citizens could steam their masks for disinfection.

Hui said that steaming masks or using ultraviolet light to sterilize them is not feasible. He stressed that surgical masks should be discarded after a few hours of use, and high-temperature sterilization will destroy the three-layer structure of the mask. Ho Pak-leung cited the example of medical staff being infected due to reusing masks during the 2003 SARS outbreak.

=== Recognition ===
According to a 2022 report by Sing Tao Daily, in the 2021 list of the top 2% of global scientists across science, engineering, and medicine released by Stanford University, which is based on bibliometric indicators such as publication counts and citations, Hui was ranked second globally in respiratory science. In comments to the press, Hui said he was surprised by the ranking and noted that his work focuses on clinical research, which typically has fewer resources than basic science, but aims to address practical medical questions, particularly during the COVID-19 pandemic.

== Honor ==
- Membership of the Royal Colleges of Physicians of the United Kingdom MRCP (UK) 1991
- Fellow of the Royal Australasian College of Physicians FRACP 1994
- Fellow of the Hong Kong College of Physicians FHKCP 1998
- Fellow of the Hong Kong Academy of Medicine (Medicine) 1998
- Fellow of the Royal College of Physicians of London, UK FRCP (Lond) 2002
- Fellow of Royal College of Physicians and Surgeons of Glasgow FRCP (Glasg) 2002
- Fellow of the Royal College of Physicians of Edinburgh (FRCP (Edin)) 2002
- Bronze Bauhinia Star (BBS) 2017

== Family ==
David Hui Shu-cheong's eldest brother is an engineer and his elder sister works in information technology. The siblings have stayed in Australia to develop their careers. His youngest brother is Ron Hui Shu-yuen, Chair Professor of the Department of Electrical and Electronic Engineering at the University of Hong Kong. After completing his medical studies in Australia, David Hui Shu-cheong and his brother returned to Hong Kong to develop their careers in 1998.
