= Dennis Lo =

Hong Kong molecular biologist

Professor Dennis Lo SBS JP FRS FRCP FRCPath
- 盧煜明
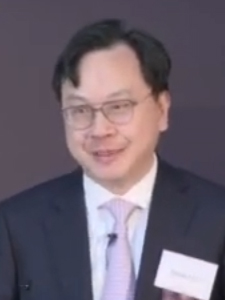
- Lo attending an academic conference at University of Cambridge on 20 April 2023

9th Vice-Chancellor and President of the Chinese University of Hong Kong
- Assuming office 8 January 2025
- Chancellor: John Lee
- Succeeding: Rocky Tuan

Personal details
- Born: October 12, 1963 (age 63) British Hong Kong
- Spouse: Alice Siu Ling Wong
- Scientific career
- Education: Emmanuel College, Cambridge (MA); Christ Church, Oxford (BM BCh); Hertford College, Oxford (DPhil, DM)
- Known for: Non-invasive prenatal testing Liquid biopsy Cell-free fetal DNA detection in blood plasma
- Awards: King Faisal Prize in Medicine (2014); Breakthrough Prize in Life Sciences (2021); Royal Medal (2021); Lasker-DeBakey Clinical Medical Research Award (2022)
- Fields: Molecular biology
- Workplaces: Chinese University of Hong Kong; University of Oxford
- Thesis: Genetic analysis of fetal cells in maternal blood (1994)
- Doctoral advisor: Kenneth Anthony Fleming

Dennis Lo
- Traditional Chinese: 盧煜明
- Simplified Chinese: 卢煜明
Transcriptions
Yue: Cantonese
- Yale Romanization: Lòuh Yūk Mìhng
- Jyutping: Lou^{4} Juk^{1} Ming^{4}

Dennis Lo Yuk-ming (Chinese: 盧煜明; Jyutping: Lou4 Juk1 Ming4, born 12 October 1963) is a Hong Kong molecular biologist who has been serving as the vice-chancellor and president of the Chinese University of Hong Kong (CUHK) since 8 January 2025. His research focuses on the detection of cell-free fetal DNA in blood plasma, and he is best known for his contributions to the development of non-invasive prenatal testing.

At CUHK, Lo is Li Ka Shing Professor of Medicine. Previously Lo was the Associate Dean (Research) at Faculty of Medicine, the head of the department of chemical pathology, and the director of the Li Ka Shing Institute of Health Sciences.

== Early life and education ==
Lo was born in Hong Kong in 1964. His mother taught music and his father, Lo Wai-hoi, who immigrated from Chaozhou to Hong Kong in 1946, was a psychiatrist and the former head of Castle Peak Hospital. Lo also has a younger brother.

Lo attended St Joseph's College for his primary and secondary education. After secondary school, he was accepted by Stanford University for electrical engineering, and by the University of Hong Kong and University of Cambridge for medicine. He selected to study medicine abroad. In 1983, at the age of 20, Lo arrived at Emmanuel College, Cambridge, where he spent two years completing his preclinical medical training and a BA degree, and his third studying genetic cloning. In 1986, Lo moved to the University of Oxford for his clinical training, in part, he claimed, thanks to Christopher Wren's architectural works at Oxford. Lo completed his medical degree (BM BCh) in 1989; he was at Christ Church College during this period.

After obtaining his medical degree, Lo continued to study at Oxford, first obtaining a DPhil (during which he was at Hertford College) in 1994, and then a Doctor of Medicine (DM) degree in 2001. He was also a junior research fellow in natural sciences at Hertford College between 1990 and 1993, and the Wellcome Career Development Fellow in Clinical Medicine from 1993 to 1994.

== Career ==
Lo began his research career studying polymerase chain reaction (PCR), a molecular biological technique for rapidly generating millions of copies of a desired DNA sequence. He first heard about the technique at a lecture by John Bell, now Regius Professor of Medicine, at Oxford, and asked to learn the technique from Bell. Working with Kenneth Anthony Fleming, his future PhD advisor, Lo found the relatively new technique generated a lot of false positives due to contamination.

Lo then wondered if fetal DNA was detectable in mother's blood. Using PCR, he detected the Y chromosome in a mother bearing a baby boy. During his PhD, Lo wanted to develop his research into prenatal diagnostic test, using fetal DNA from fetal cells in the mother's blood. This, however, was stymied by a number of factors, including low concentration of fetal cells, high false positive rate and the persistence of fetal cells after giving birth.

After obtaining his PhD, Lo became a lecturer in clinical biochemistry and a fellow at Green College, University of Oxford (now part of Green Templeton College). He was also an honorary consultant chemical pathologist at John Radcliffe Hospital, the major teaching hospital for Oxford.

In 1997, again using the Y chromosome as a marker in mothers bearing baby boys, Lo reported the presence of cell-free fetal DNA in most of the test subjects. This was after he read that circulating tumor DNA were detectable in cancer patients' blood plasma and switched strategy to search for cell-free fetal DNA in mother's blood.

Lo, who by the time was married, returned to Hong Kong the same year with his wife, as the city was preparing its handing back to China. He became a senior lecturer in the Department of Chemical Pathology at the Chinese University of Hong Kong (CUHK) in January 1997. In an interview years later, he called this discovery was like "finding your car's engine somewhere other than under the bonnet."

One of the first disorders for which Lo developed non-invasive prenatal testing using cell-free fetal DNA was Rh disease, a type of anaemia that occurs when the foetus is Rh-positive but the mother is Rh-negative. Separately, Lo also detected fetal RNA in mother's blood, which indicated what genes were expressed. He then sought novel methods to isolate fetal DNA from mother's blood, which in 2002 came in the form of difference in DNA methylation between the mother and foetus.

Lo's research into non-invasive prenatal testing was interrupted in 2003 by the SARS outbreak. An infected patient was treated at the Prince of Wales Hospital, the teaching hospital for CUHK Faculty of Medicine, turning the hospital into one of the epicenters in Hong Kong. His group was one of the first to sequence the SARS virus and to discover the existence of multiple viral strains.

Lo returned to studying detection of cell-free fetal DNA after the SARS outbreak. In 2008, he reported the use of next-generation sequencing (NGS), which has a much higher throughput than traditional PCR and was a relatively new technology at the time. When used to detect Down syndrome, which is caused by an extra chromosome 21, this method was later shown to have a 100% sensitivity and a nearly 98% specificity, prompting its introduction into clinics in 2011.

The next year, while watching a Harry Potter movie in 3D, the flying "H" reminded him of 2 homologous chromosomes and gave him an idea on how to sequence the fetal genome: to separately sequence the 2 halves of DNA that the foetus inherited from the father and the mother. For the father's half, they searched for DNA sequences present only in the father but not the mother; for the mother's half, they counted the DNA sequences from the mother to deduce the sequences inherited by the foetus, which would be found in excess in the mother's blood plasma. This discovery created a non-invasive method to detect fetal mutations. In 2013, his group showed that the fetal epigenome could also be determined from mother's blood plasma.

Apart from non-invasive prenatal testing, Lo started investigating cancer diagnosis, profiling and prognosis from circulating tumor DNA using NGS in 2012, when he reported the genetic profiling of cancer in patients' blood plasma.

As of October 2021, Lo is an associate editor of Clinical Chemistry.

Lo is the co-founder of 2 biotechnology companies, both established in 2014. Using funding from the venture capital firm Decheng Capital, he co-founded Cirina with his longtime CUHK collaborators Rossa Chiu and Allen Chan. The company focuses on cancer detection with circulating tumor DNA. The company was acquired by GRAIL in 2017, which, in turn, was acquired by Illumina in 2021. The 3 of them also co-founded Xcelom, which commercialised their research in non-invasive prenatal testing.

In the 2021 Hong Kong legislative election, Lo was a registered elector in the functional constituency of Technology and Innovation and the geographical constituency of Kowloon West. The State Key Laboratory of Translational Oncology at CUHK, with which he is affiliated, is also a corporate elector (an elector that is a legal entity, as opposed to a natural person) at the same functional constituency. As Lo is also a member of the Election Committee of Hong Kong, making him eligible to vote in the Election Committee constituency, he was one of the 41 voters who held 4 votes and whose voting power would be approximately 7,215 times of an ordinary citizen.

On 22 September 2024, Lo was nominated as a candidate to succeed Rocky Tuan as CUHK president and vice-chancellor. He was the sole candidate, and his nomination was approved unanimously on 27 September 2024. He assumed office on 8 January 2025.

== Honours and awards ==
- 2000 – Ten Outstanding Young Person of Hong Kong
- 2001 – Ten Outstanding Young Persons of the World
- 2005 – State Natural Science Award, Second-class, Ministry of Science and Technology, China
- 2006 – Award for Significant Contributions in Molecular Diagnostics, International Federation of Clinical Chemistry and Laboratory Medicine
- 2007 – Award for Outstanding Contribution for a Publication in the International Journal Clinical Chemistry, American Association for Clinical Chemistry
- 2011 – Fellow of the Royal Society
- 2013 – Foreign Associate of the National Academy of Sciences
- 2013 – Fellow of The World Academy of Sciences
- 2014 – King Faisal Prize in Medicine
- 2016 – Future Science Prize Life Science Prize
- 2017, 2021, 2023 – Asian Scientist 100, Asian Scientist
- 2020 – Award for Excellence in Molecular Diagnostics, Association for Molecular Pathology
- 2021 – Breakthrough Prize in Life Sciences
- 2021 – Royal Medal
- 2022 – Lasker-DeBakey Clinical Medical Research Award

== Personal life ==
Lo is married to Alice Siu Ling Wong. They met each other while Lo was pursuing his DPhil at the University of Oxford, where Wong was completing her DPhil in semiconductor physics. They got married in 1994.

As of 2016, Wong is an associate professor and the head of the former Division of Mathematics and Science Education, Faculty of Education at the University of Hong Kong. She is no longer on the faculty list as of 2021.

It was reported in 2021 that Lo bought a flat at The Masterpiece in Tsim Sha Tsui, Hong Kong for HKD$210 million.

Lo is one of the initiators of the Hong Kong Coalition, co-founded by two former Chief Executives of Hong Kong Tung Chee-hwa and Leung Chun-ying.

Academic offices
Preceded by Rocky Tuan	9th Vice-Chancellor of the Chinese University of Hong Kong; Since 2025	Incumbent
