= Robert H. Christenson =

President of American Association for Clinical Chemistry

Robert H. Christenson is an American chemist. As of 2026, he is a professor of pathology and professor of medical and research technology at the University of Maryland School of Medicine in Baltimore. He was previously the president of the American Association for Clinical Chemistry (AACC).

Christenson is a member of the editorial boards of Clinical Chemistry and the Journal of Clinical and Laboratory Analysis, and associate editor of Clinical Biochemistry.
