= Siege of the Chinese University of Hong Kong =

Conflict during 2019–2020 Hong Kong protests

- Part of 2019–2020 Hong Kong protests
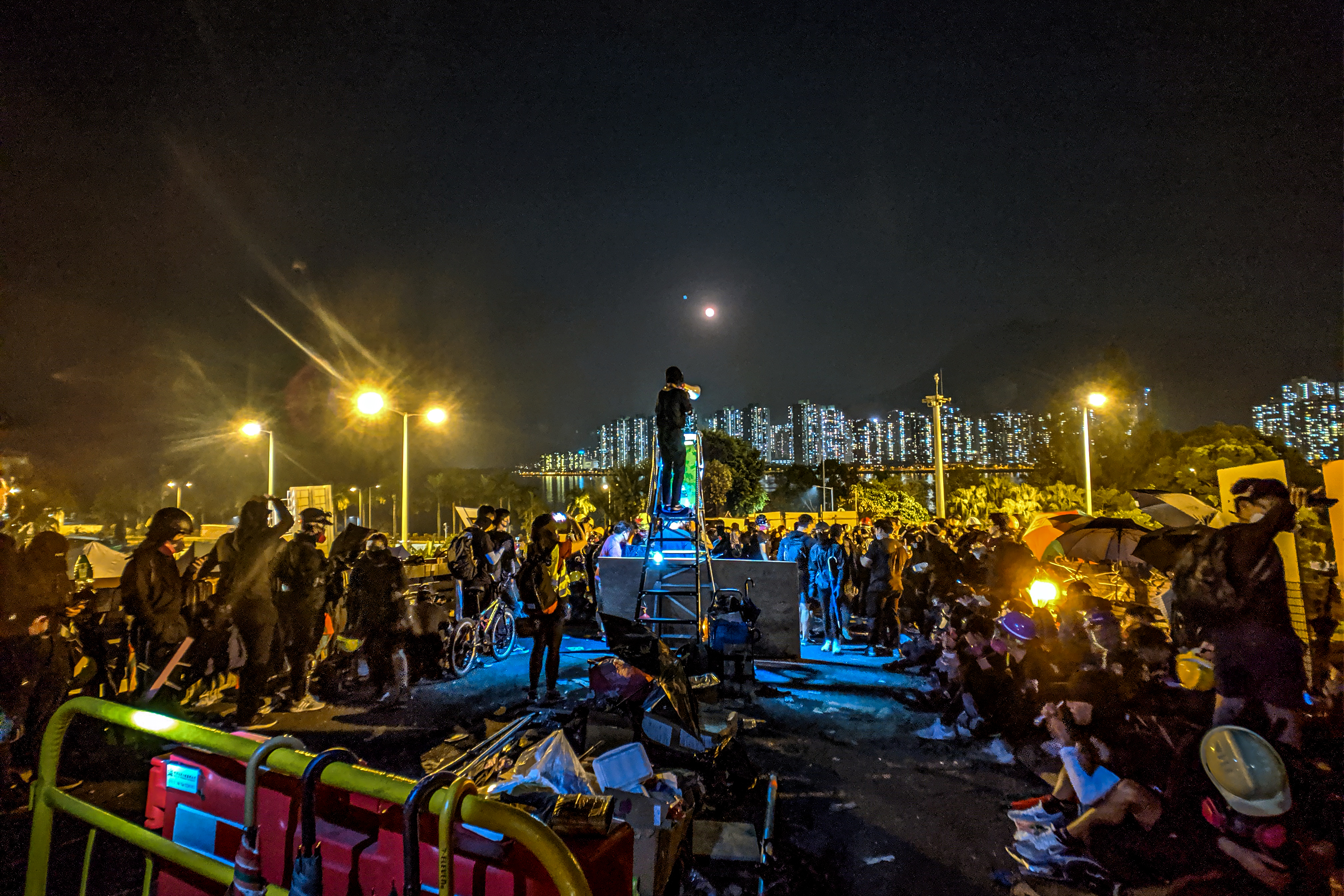
- Protesters guarding the No. 2 Bridge of the Chinese University of Hong Kong on 13 November
- Date: 11–15 November 2019
- Location: Chinese University of Hong Kong campus and other districts
- Caused by: The police attempted to seize control of the No. 2 Bridge of the Chinese University of Hong Kong to prevent the protesters from blocking the Tolo Highway
- Result: Protesters retreated after fending off the police advance, some headed to Hong Kong Polytechnic University

Parties
Protesters; Dragon Slaying Brigade; University students	Hong Kong Police Force

Injuries and arrests
- Injuries: 119+
- Arrested: 5+

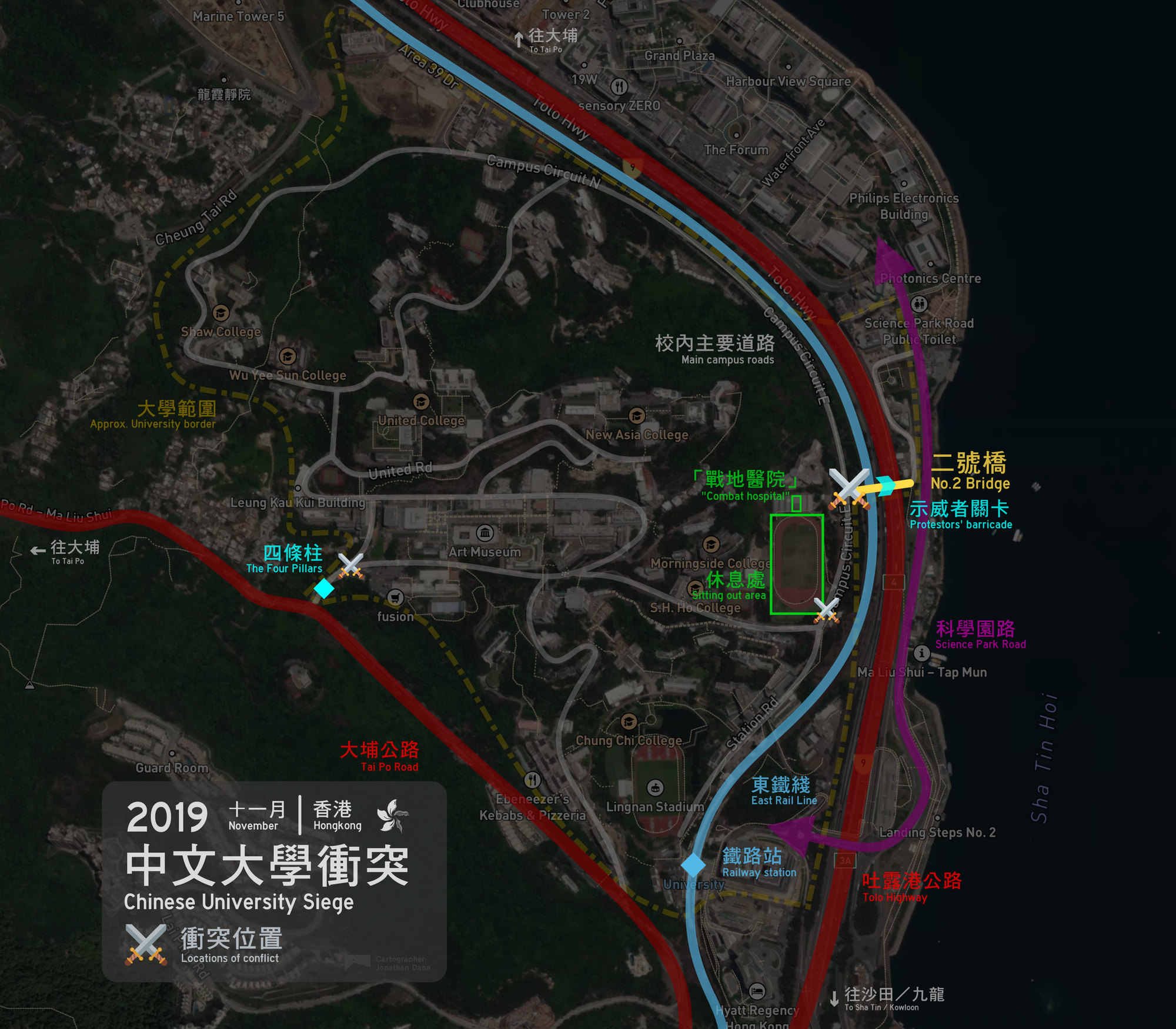
Map of the siege

The siege of the Chinese University of Hong Kong was a part of the 2019–2020 Hong Kong protests. As protesters disrupted traffic to facilitate a general strike on 11 November 2019, other protesters inside Chinese University of Hong Kong (CUHK) threw objects onto railway tracks near the University station, to which the Hong Kong Police Force responded by shooting pepper bullets at students and launching volleys of tear gas into the campus. The next day saw various clashes and skirmishes between the two sides, with the police storming into campus to conduct arrests while the protesters, in response, threw petrol bombs. After nightfall, the university's vice-chancellor and president Rocky Tuan arrived to seek mediation with the police, who refused to negotiate. The conflict escalated into widespread protests in various parts of Hong Kong in an attempt to divert the police's attention. At least 119 students were injured.

Protesters briefly occupied the university from 13 to 15 November and set up barricades and crafted makeshift weapons inside the university campus. Other university students also barricaded the school after the siege. The majority of the protesters left the campus by 15 November, with some leaving for the Hong Kong Polytechnic University, which was besieged by the police on 17 November.

The police received criticism for storming the university campus, though they defended the act, claiming that the campus was a "weapon factory".

== Background ==
As the number of allegations against the Hong Kong Police Force during the 2019–2020 Hong Kong protests continued to increase, violence from both the protesters and the police escalated significantly. The death of Chow Tsz-lok, who had died after falling from the second storey of a building onto a car park in Sheung Tak Estate, Tseung Kwan O, led to widespread outrage in Hong Kong. Observers saw the death as having had a major role in several universities across Hong Kong becoming the site of clashes between protesters and police, in deviation from the earlier tactics of protesters which relied on fluid movement. While the cause of the death of Chow would never be found, with a jury delivering an open verdict in January 2021, protesters accused the police of obstructing paramedics from attending to him, resulting in a delay in treatment.

Protesters began calling for a general strike, which would be facilitated by the obstruction of traffic during rush hours. Demonstrators dubbed the strategy as "Dawn Action". Protesters inside the Chinese University of Hong Kong were also involved in this operation.

== History ==
=== 11 November ===
Students in CUHK began throwing objects onto the East Rail line and Tolo Highway in order to support a general strike in Hong Kong. Police set up a perimeter at the No. 2 Bridge. At 8:00 am, the police confronted protesters at No. 2 Bridge, and eventually dispersed them, cordoning off Tolo Highway to avoid further disruption. At 11:00 am, the police shot volleys of tear gas into the university campus. The protesters reacted by using incendiary bombs. Soon after, the university announced the suspension of lessons for the day.

=== 12 November ===
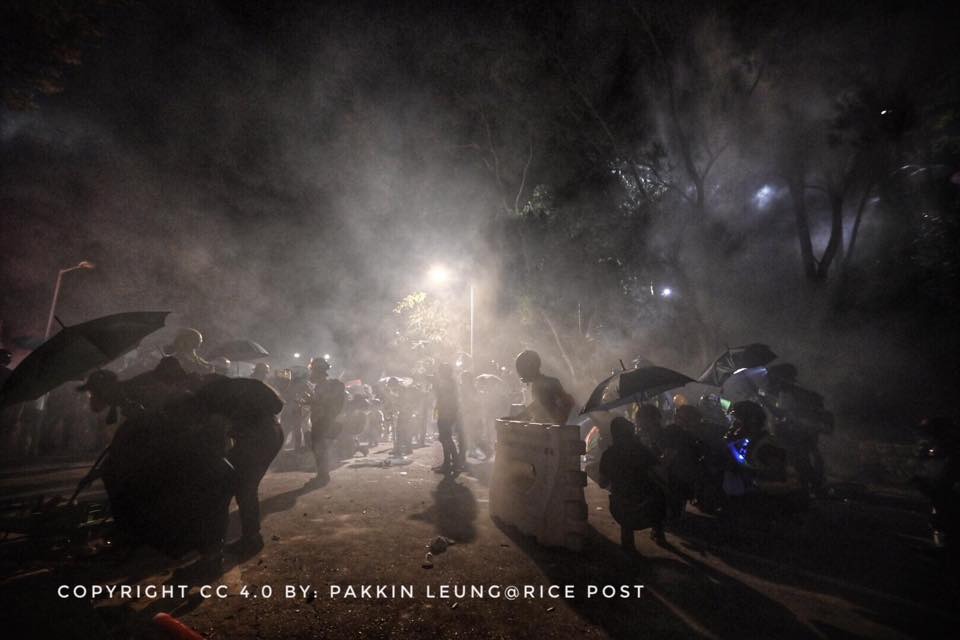
The police shot numerous volleys of tear gas into the campus of CUHK on 12 November.

On the second day of the conflict, protesters continued to attempt to block traffic. Students again began to throw objects onto the railway tracks and blocked major roads nearby. Starting at 7:00 am, the police began a standoff with the protesters, who attempted to stop the police from clearing the roadblocks set on the bridge. Vice-presidents of CUHK attempted to negotiate with the police. However, the negotiations broke off as the police advanced and began firing tear gas into the campus, while the student protesters, in response, hurled bricks and petrol bombs at around 3 pm. The police entered the university through the No. 2 Bridge, arrested several people inside the campus, and shot canisters of tear gas and rubber bullets at students on the Sir Philip Haddon-Cave Sports Field. Some students also broke into the school's storage room and retrieved bows and arrows.

In the evening, several CUHK alumni, including businessman Ricky Wong, returned to CUHK to stand in solidarity with the student protesters. CUHK vice-chancellor Rocky Tuan was at the scene and attempted to negotiate with police representatives; police responded by rejecting the request for negotiation and ordering Tuan to leave immediately, saying that he was not able to control the situation. Protesters also demanded the police release the students who had been arrested inside CUHK. At around 7:30 pm, while Tuan was still on campus, the police began firing tear gas at the protesters, who, in response, hurled a large number of petrol bombs, forcing the police to retreat from their initial position. At 10:00 pm, the police for a short time deployed water cannons, while protesters threw petrol bombs to stop them from advancing. The police issued a statement about 10 minutes later to announce that they would be retreating from campus to stop the situation from further escalating. Former university president Joseph Sung Jao-yiu arrived at the campus on 10:30 pm in an attempt to deescalate the situation.

To divert the police's attention, protesters instigated conflicts elsewhere in Hong Kong. Protesters marched into the Festival Walk shopping centre in Kowloon Tong after the mall closed early and set a giant Christmas tree on fire; some glass balustrades and doors were also smashed. A China Mobile shop was set on fire in Causeway Bay. In Sheung Shui, a train was firebombed and objects were thrown onto the train track. In Mong Kok, police fired multiple tear gas rounds as protesters blocked roads and vandalised public infrastructure, such as traffic lights and switchboxes. In Tin Shui Wai, protesters besieged and started a fire inside the police station. In Sha Tin, a police van was lit on fire.

A volunteer paramedic reported that at least 119 protesters were injured. The university gym room was turned into a field hospital to treat the wounded. The police announced that 142 people were arrested on 12 November. Police also reported that they had used about 1,567 canisters of tear gas, 1,312 shots of rubber bullets, 380 shots of bean bag rounds, and 126 shots of sponge grenades to disperse the protesters.

=== 13–14 November ===
After the confrontations at CUHK and other universities on 12 November, protesters turned the university campuses into strongholds. Supplies were delivered to them by supporters of the protesters from various districts in Hong Kong. Expecting the riot police to return, some of the protesters stayed in CUHK and slept in the car park and the sports grounds. In the morning of 13 November, protesters fortified the campuses by constructing roadblocks and barricades using bricks and furniture such as tables and chairs at major entrances near the university. Supplies from supporters, including medical bandages and food, were delivered to various universities in Hong Kong. A gym room inside CUHK was converted into a first-aid station. Protesters also practised throwing petrol bombs inside the campus, set up caltrops, removed sports equipment such as bows and arrows, javelins, and rackets, and set up makeshift catapults. Media noted that protesters were recreating "medieval weapons".

University administration cancelled all classes for the remaining semester. The president of the CUHK student union applied for an interim injunction to stop the police from entering the university campuses without proper warrant, though the court dismissed the application. The police sent one of their boats to CUHK to evacuate a group of mainland Chinese students from the university, after they had expressed concerns for their safety at the campus; the police said the students had been unable to leave the campus by road due to obstructions. The Taipei Economic and Cultural Office in Hong Kong sent representatives to CUHK and arranged for 85 Taiwanese students to return to Taiwan.

=== 15 November ===
At 3:00 am, three masked protesters at CUHK held a press conference. They indicated an intention to reopen one lane in each direction of the Tolo Highway as a symbol of good faith, demanding the government hold the 2019 District Council elections as scheduled on 24 November, release arrested people, and establish an independent commission of inquiry within 24 hours. In a statement, the CUHK Students' Union stated that they questioned the three protesters' plan to open the highway to traffic, and that none of their members participated in the press conference. Protesters cleared one lane in each direction at 6 am; however, the Transport Department kept the highway closed due to safety concerns. The highway was officially reopened at noon. Protesters blocked the highway again at 7:30 pm after Chief Secretary for Administration Matthew Cheung rejected their demands.

Protesters began to leave CUHK in the night, as divisions within the protesters showed up as to whether they should leave the campus. Some argued that the occupation of the university did not align with the fluidity the protesters had exhibited since the protests started in June.

== Aftermath ==
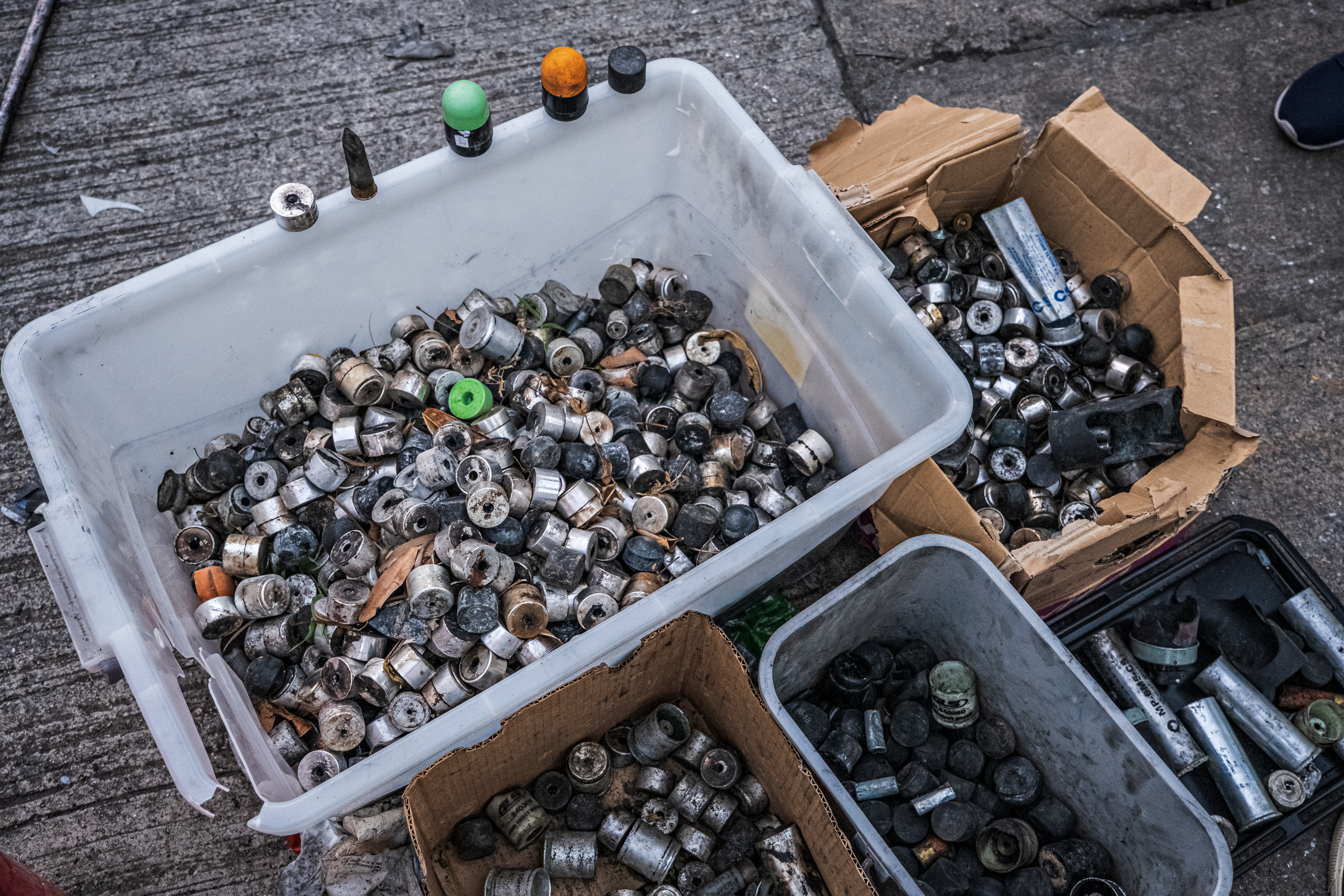
Empty shells of the fired tear gas left by the police

As protesters clashed with the police at CUHK, they also barricaded other university campuses, including Hong Kong Baptist University, the City University of Hong Kong, and the University of Hong Kong. In addition, many protesters who withdrew from CUHK moved to join the protesters stationed inside Hong Kong Polytechnic University. Protesters in Polytechnic University began clashing with the police on 17 November. The campus was then besieged by the police, who blocked all the exits of the university campuses, kettling at least 500 protesters. While some surrendered, many, including the wounded, stayed inside the campus without medical care for several days. The siege was the longest confrontation ever to occur since the demonstrations began in June, and was viewed as a setback for protesters as the police arrested more than 1,000 people during the siege.

Four students who were arrested on 12 November 2019 were charged with rioting, and three of them in addition for wearing a facial covering during an unauthorized assembly. On 21 July 2021, two students who had been convicted of rioting earlier that month were sentenced to 54 and 45 months in prison, with respectively six and three months, to be served concurrently with their other sentences, for violating the mask ban. A third defendant was jailed for two months for the latter offence. An appeal by one of the three who had been sentenced for the dual charges of rioting and wearing a facial covering was rejected in June 2022.

On 3 September 2021, the five former CUHK students who had been arrested on 11 November 2019 were convicted of rioting and using face covering during an illegal assembly. Two of them were also convicted of possession of offensive weapons or tools for unlawful purposes. In October 2021, the five were sentenced to close to five years in prison each.

After the siege, the university introduced security checks at entrances.

== Responses ==
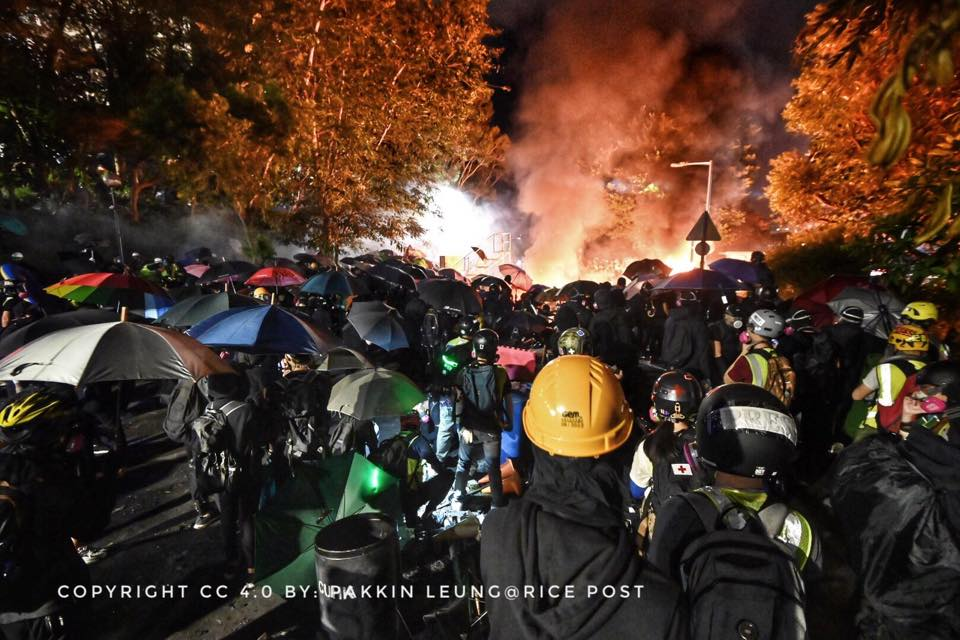
Protesters confronting the attack by the paramilitary riot police.

Academics from the Scholars’ Alliance for Academic Freedom condemned the police operations inside the university campus, calling them "unlawful". The pro-democracy camp issued a statement asking for international level assistance to save the students and to avoid a repetition of the 1989 Tiananmen Square protests and massacre. The declaration criticised the actions of police on No. 2 Bridge, who intentionally provoked students and showed no willingness to negotiate. The statement also criticised the police for cutting off supplies to CUHK and trying to invade the university by constant shooting, which had injured many students. The camp also expressed distress towards Chief Executive Carrie Lam, and reminded the students to be careful and to protect themselves.

On 11 November, President Rocky Tuan contacted the police and urged them to be calm. The university staff also encouraged the students to leave. Given the tense atmosphere, the university security office tried to mediate the situation. However, an unnamed CUHK staff member criticised the school for inadequate measures, and for having failed to ask the police to leave. The staff also showed empathy and understanding of students' behaviour. The presidents of Hong Kong's public universities released a joint statement expressing regrets that the campuses became occupied by protesters following "societal disagreements". The statement suggested that the protesters occupying the campus were not "originated from the universities, nor can they be resolved through university disciplinary processes" and urged the government to resolve the "political deadlock and to restore safety and public order now".

A spokesperson from the police responded that the force did not need a warrant to enter the university under the Public Order Ordinance. The Hong Kong Police Force spokesman warned that the protesters' acts were "another step closer to terrorism", and called CUHK a "weapon factory".

On 13 November, Taiwanese president Tsai Ing-wen posted on Facebook highlighting the previous invasions into university campuses by Taiwan police, which seriously harmed freedom of speech. She urged international concern about the situation in Hong Kong.

== See also ==
- November 2019 shooting incident in Sai Wan Ho
- Controversies of the Hong Kong Police Force
- Siege of the Hong Kong Polytechnic University
