= ADLM =

ADLM may refer to:

- Adlam script, script used to write Fulani (a specific language of West Africa)
- Association for Diagnostics & Laboratory Medicine, (formerly American Association for Clinical Chemistry or AACC) global scientific society
