= 2019 Hong Kong Polytechnic University campus conflict =

Siege during the 2019–2020 Hong Kong protests

- Part of the 2019–2020 Hong Kong protests
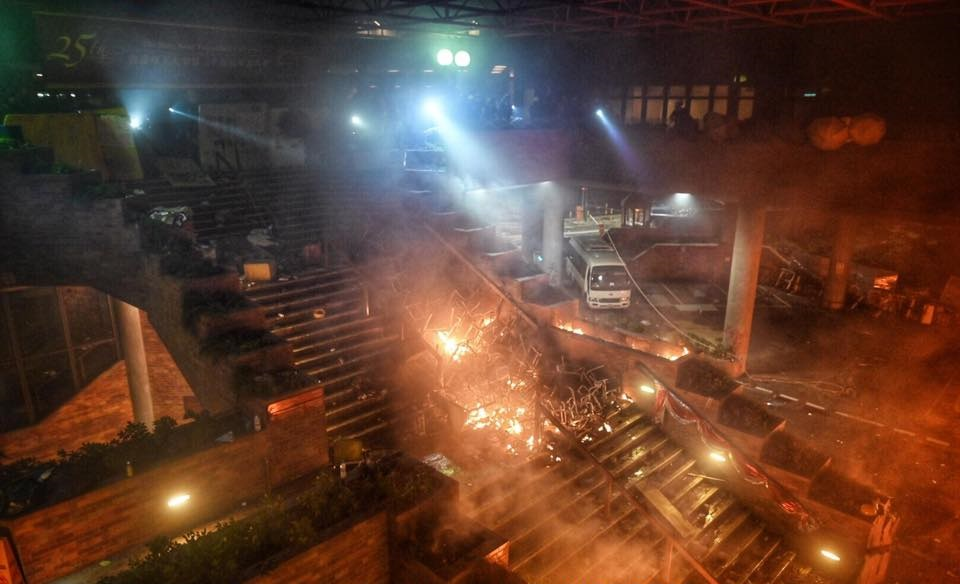
- Protesters setting fire at the entrance of the campus to stop the police from advancing on 18 November.
- Date: 17–29 November 2019; 1 week and 5 days
- Location: Hong Kong Polytechnic University, Hung Hom, Kowloon, Hong Kong
- Caused by: Police attempt to seize control of the main roads surrounding the Polytechnic University campus blocked by protesters, including the Cross-Harbour Tunnel
- Result: Protesters disperse and police clear out the campus

Parties
Protesters: Dragon Slaying Brigade; University and secondary school students	Hong Kong Police Force

Injuries and arrests
- Injuries: c. 300
- Arrested: c. 1,300

The 2019 Hong Kong Polytechnic University campus conflict, also referred to as the siege of the Hong Kong Polytechnic University or simply the PolyU Siege, occurred from 17 to 29 November 2019 on the campus of the Hong Kong Polytechnic University (PolyU), during the 2019–2020 Hong Kong protests.

The event was preceded by a similar conflict at the Chinese University of Hong Kong. It was precipitated by the setting-up of a roadblock at the Cross-Harbour Tunnel, next to the university. Protesters gathered at the university to defend the roadblock from attacks by the Hong Kong Police Force (HKPF). The police shot tear gas and used water cannons to shower the protesters with water containing blue colouring and chemical irritants. The protesters responded by throwing bricks and petrol bombs.

Thereafter, the police blocked different campus exits and forbade protesters from leaving. Police tried to drive an armoured vehicle into campus but the vehicle was hit by petrol bombs, forcing it to reverse. The police arrested people who claimed to be first-aid personnel, medical volunteers and reporters.

On 18 November the police shot 1,458 canisters of tear gas at protesters as well as 1,391 rubber bullets, 325 bean bag rounds, and 256 sponge grenades. On 19 November the city's hospitals were overwhelmed by the number of protesters needing urgent medical attention caused by the siege, and advised citizens not to use emergency rooms unless absolutely necessary.

== 17 November ==
At around 10:00 am, some citizens attempted to clear the roadblocks between Austin Road and Chatham Road South, near Rosary Church. During their attempt to remove the obstacles in the road, protesters blocked their actions and prevented them from dismantling the roadblocks. During the confrontation, bricks were thrown towards the people clearing the obstacles. Riot police arrived at around 11:00 and confronted the protesters, firing tear gas and rubber bullets at them. The protesters responded by throwing bricks and petrol bombs. The situation deteriorated by the afternoon, where water cannons and armoured cars were used to breach the protesters' line. Blue-dyed water fired from the water cannons was continuously used, with the protesters fighting back with bricks and petrol bombs.

Around 9:00 pm, the police publicly announced that anyone arrested inside Polytechnic University would face the charge of rioting, as would anyone who attempted to go in or help people inside. The police added that anyone inside the campus could peacefully leave via the exit at Y-core. However, those attempting to leave via the designated exit were instead arrested. Among the people arrested were university staff, reporters, social workers, volunteer first-aid personnel, doctors and nurses. Police claimed that protesters were disguising themselves as medical workers. Dr Arisina Ma, president of Hong Kong Public Doctors’ Association, criticised the police for arresting and detaining them for 24 hours and then forcing them to post bail instead of simply checking their professional identification and releasing them. Surgeon Darren Mann, who had witnessed medics being hogtied and who had telephoned both the Red Cross and Médecins Sans Frontières asking them to intervene, criticised the police for treating medical personnel like terrorists, stating: "The arrest of [active medical] personnel is almost unheard of in civilised countries and is incompatible with the compact of humanitarianism".

Polytechnic University authorities released a statement saying that protesters had damaged its laboratories and stolen dangerous chemicals. Subsequently, safety concerns mounted as the Chinese University, Polytechnic University, and City University also reported to police that chemicals – several of which are toxic, corrosive, or flammable, and deadly – had been stolen from their laboratories.

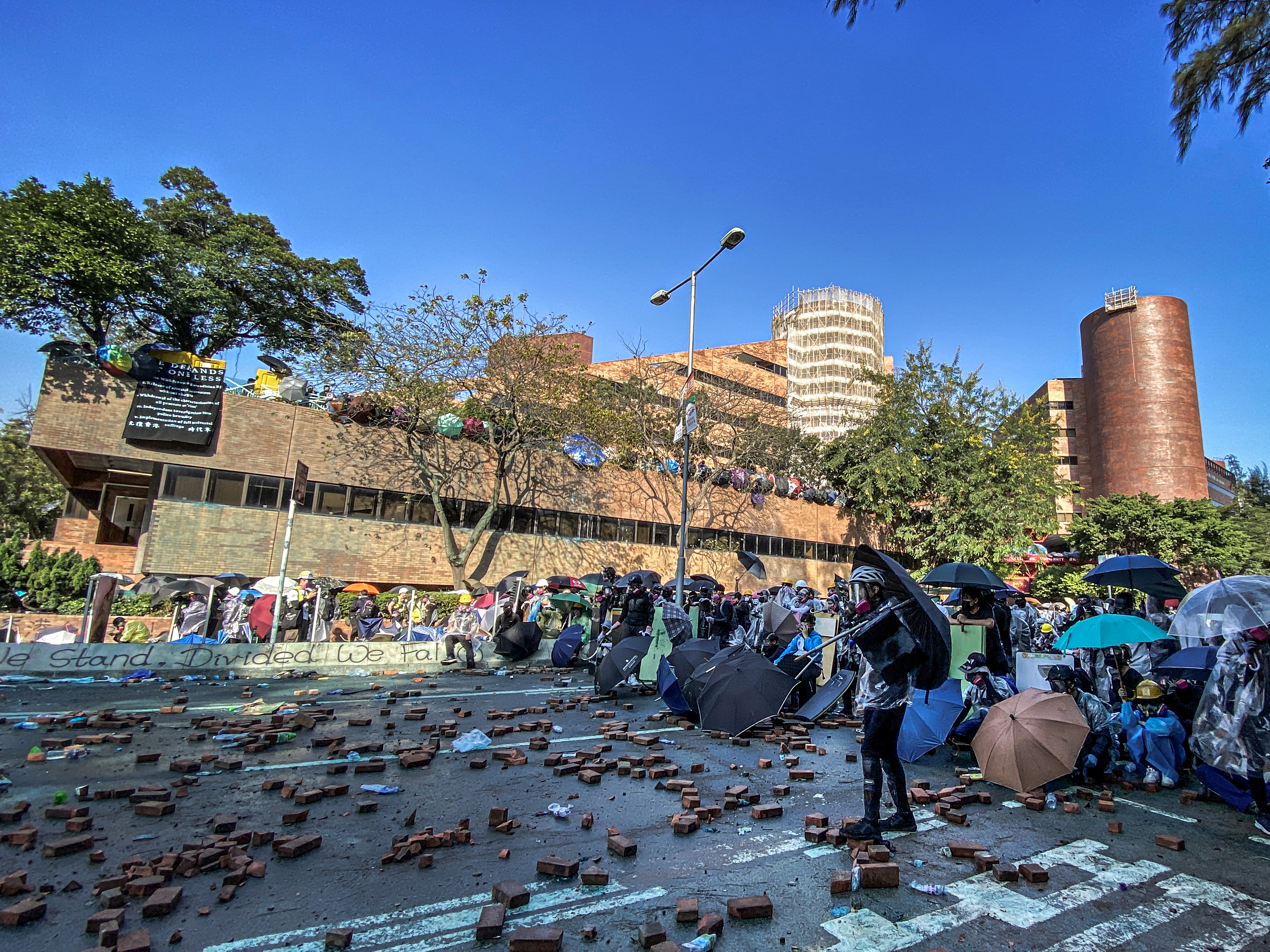
Confrontation between protesters and police in Cheong Wan Road near PolyU

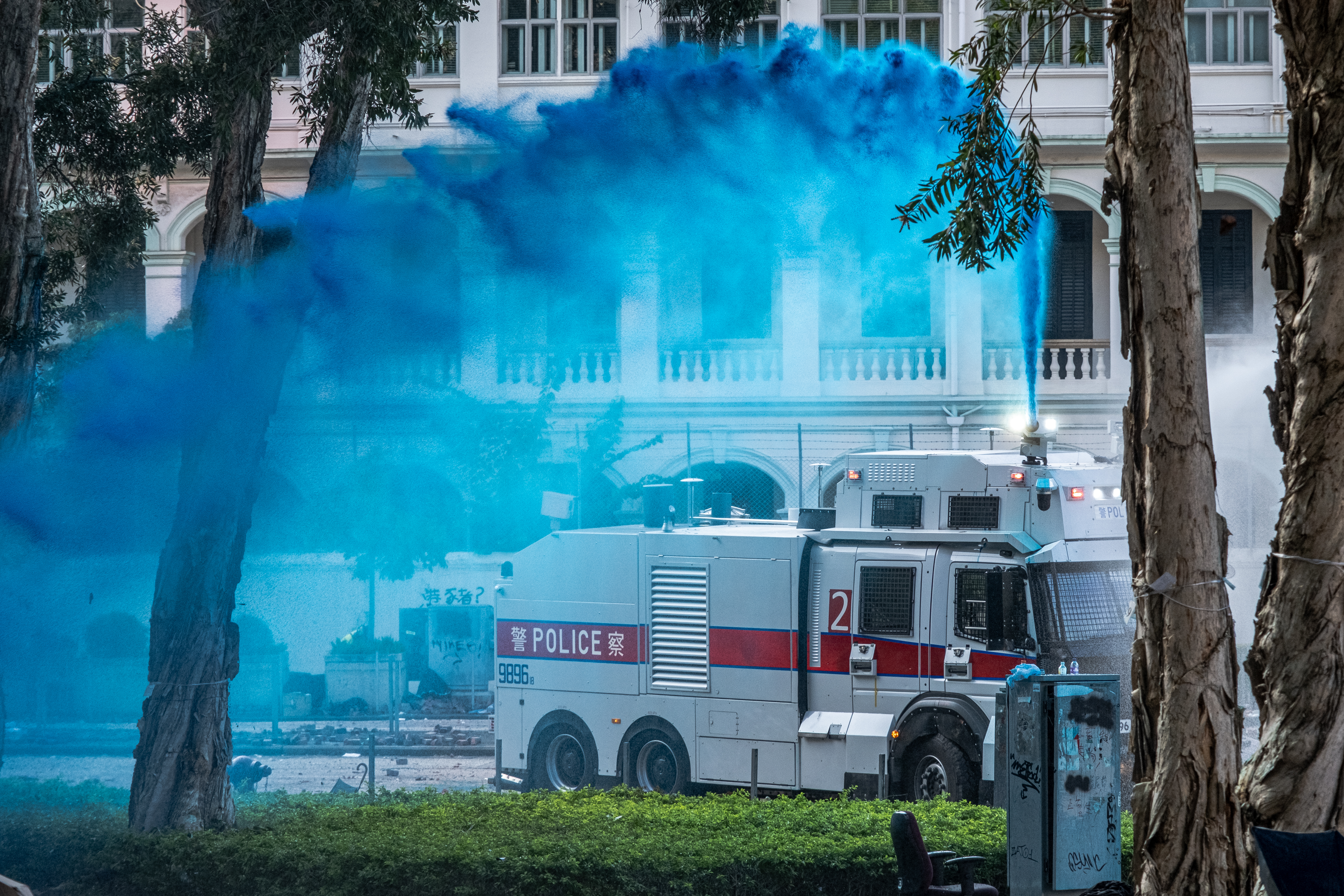
Police using a dyed water cannon to disperse protesters from the road

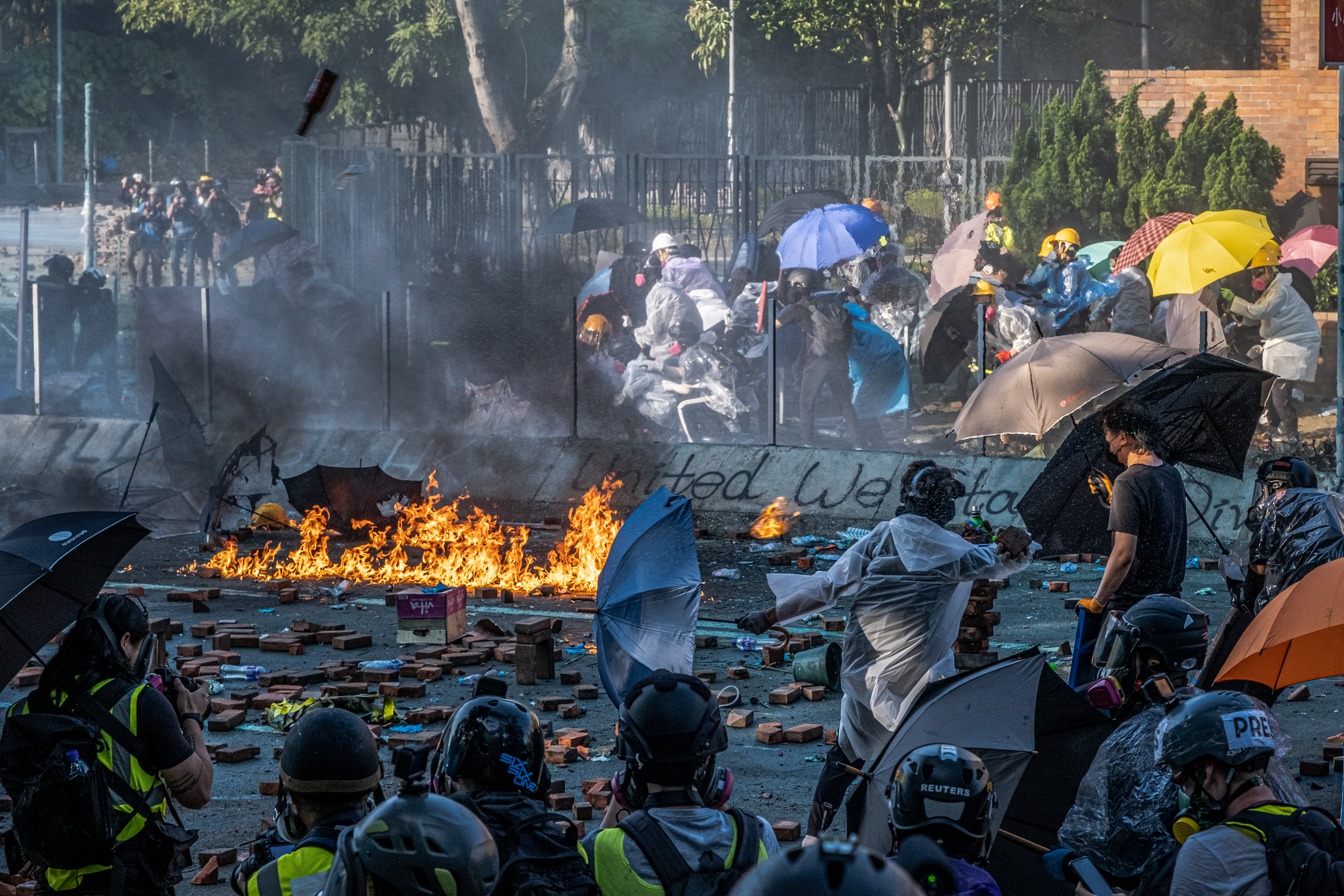
Protesters throwing molotov cocktails at the police

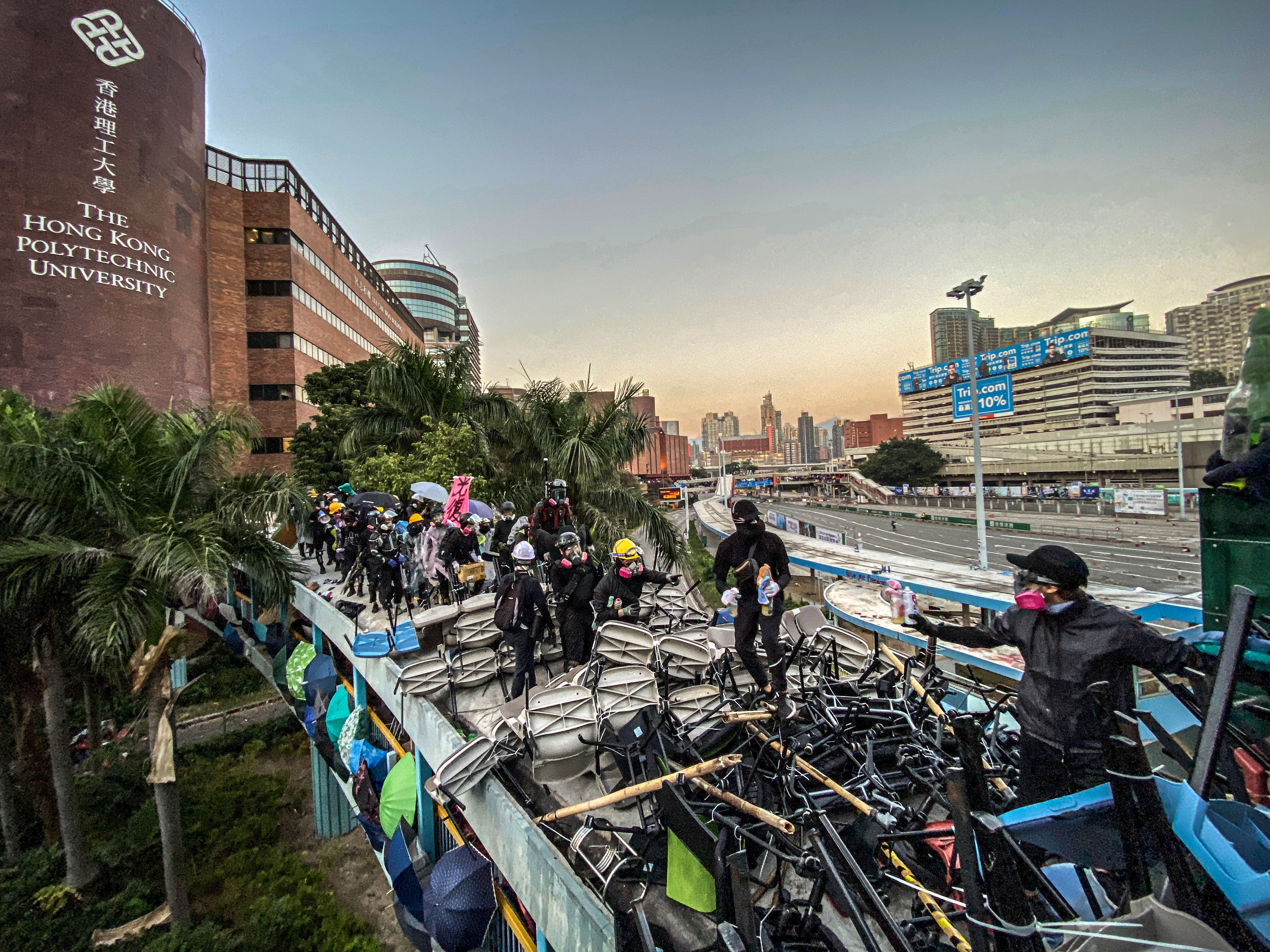
Protesters walking on the rooftop of the bridge connecting PolyU and nearby districts

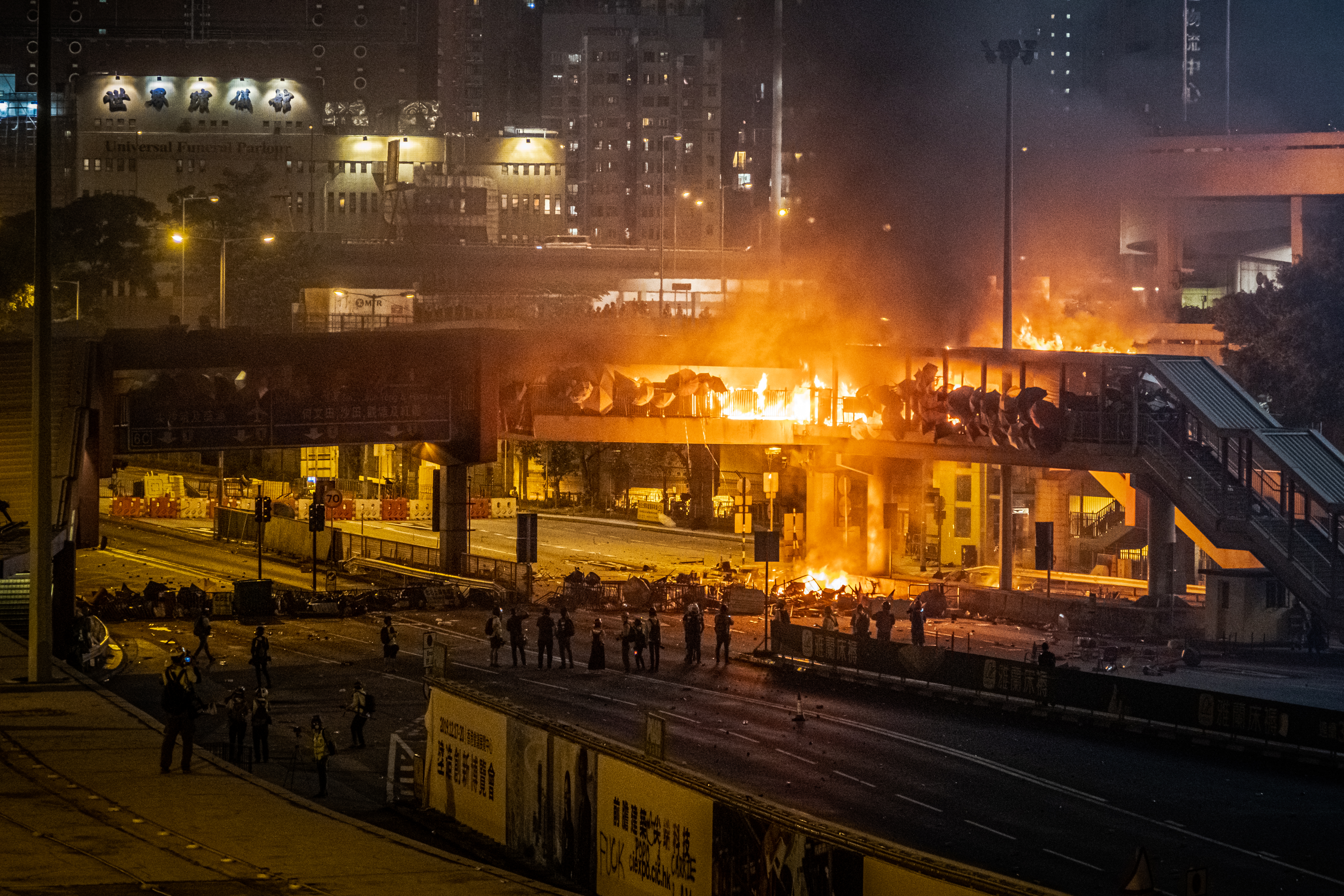
Fire in the Cross-Harbour Tunnel bridge that connects the MTR station and PolyU

== 18 November ==
Auxiliary Bishop of Hong Kong Joseph Ha and a number of pro-democracy legislators requested to meet the HKPF commander, hoping that the crisis could be settled in a peaceful way, but HKPF declined. Afterwards, pro-democracy legislators held a press conference and declared there was a severe humanitarian crisis happening inside Polytechnic University and demanded Hong Kong Chief Executive Carrie Lam speak up and end the crisis immediately to avoid any serious consequences.

At 9:00 am, an RTHK reporter preparing to relieve a colleague inside in accordance with procedures predetermined by the police went to the indicated place for swapping out. Riot police shouted at the journalist and ordered him to put his hands up while they checked his press ID and identity card. When the reporter claimed that he only wanted to go on duty, riot police refused to let him out and insisted that he had to leave by another route. He was escorted by the police as he was leaving. Other reporters of RTHK who passed the Cross-Harbour Tunnel and wanted to document the events unfolding at PolyU were likewise blocked and ordered to leave by the riot police. The police indicated that everyone inside PolyU would be charged with "participating in a riot".

At 11:00 am, the police fired tear gas towards Queen Elizabeth Hospital which injured some protesters and forced the hospital to suspend specialist services and to use plastic tape to seal its windows and doors.

Police arrested 213 protesters in their dispersal operations across Kowloon that night, all of whom were charged with rioting. On 8 June 2023, police said that said protesters had been grouped into 17 cases and tried by the District Court. As of that date a total of 112 individuals had been found guilty of rioting, of which 85 people were jailed between 29 and 64 months, four were sentenced to a training centre, and the remaining 23 were awaiting sentencing. On 5 November 2025, the Court of Appeal reduced the sentences of 10 petitioners who had attempted to break out of the campus that day by up to six months, on the grounds that the starting points for their original sentences had been too high.

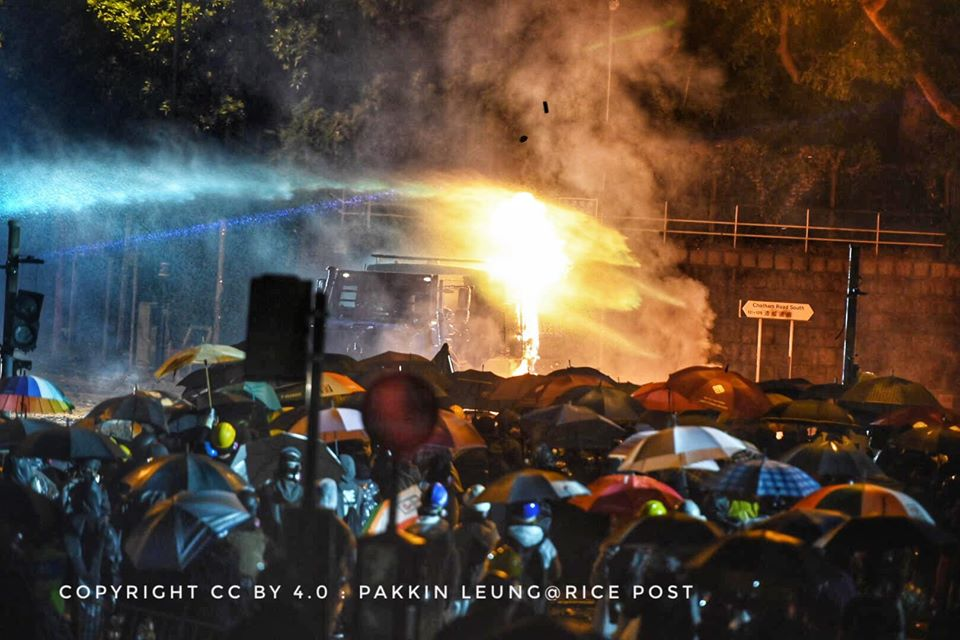
Police using a water cannon truck

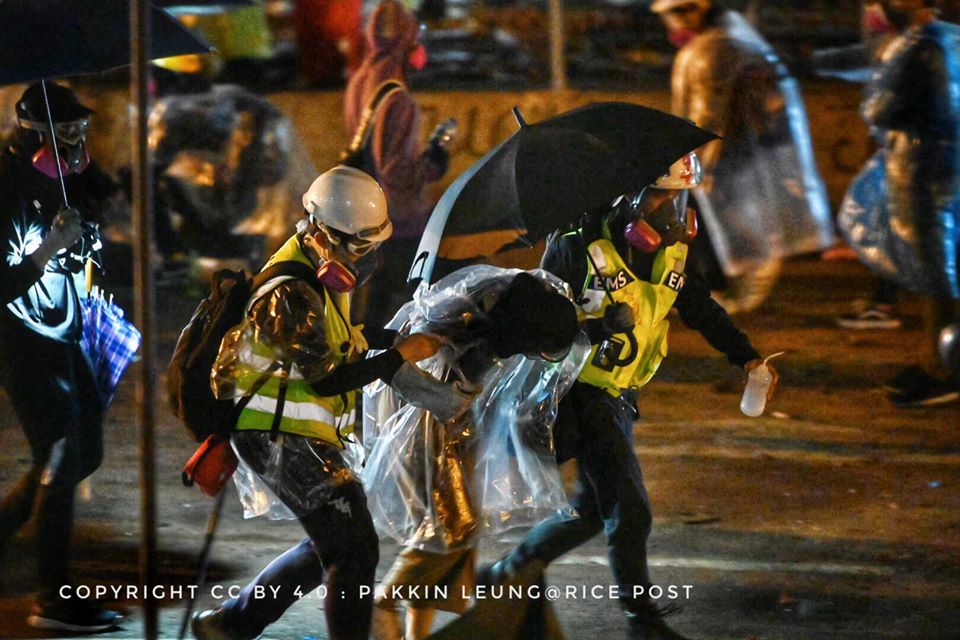
Volunteer first-aid personnel and medics helping injured protesters

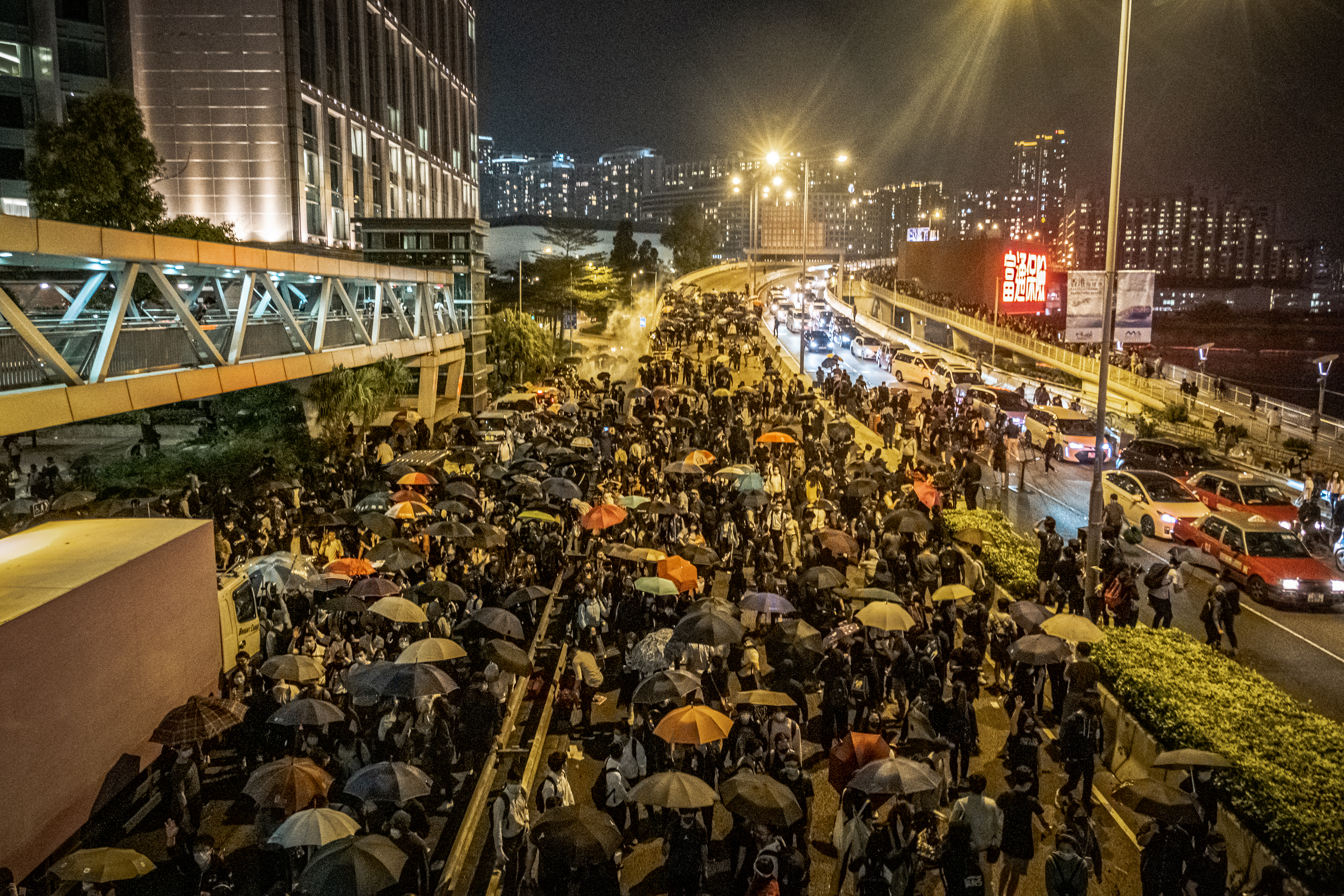
Other protesters heading to PolyU to "rescue" trapped protesters

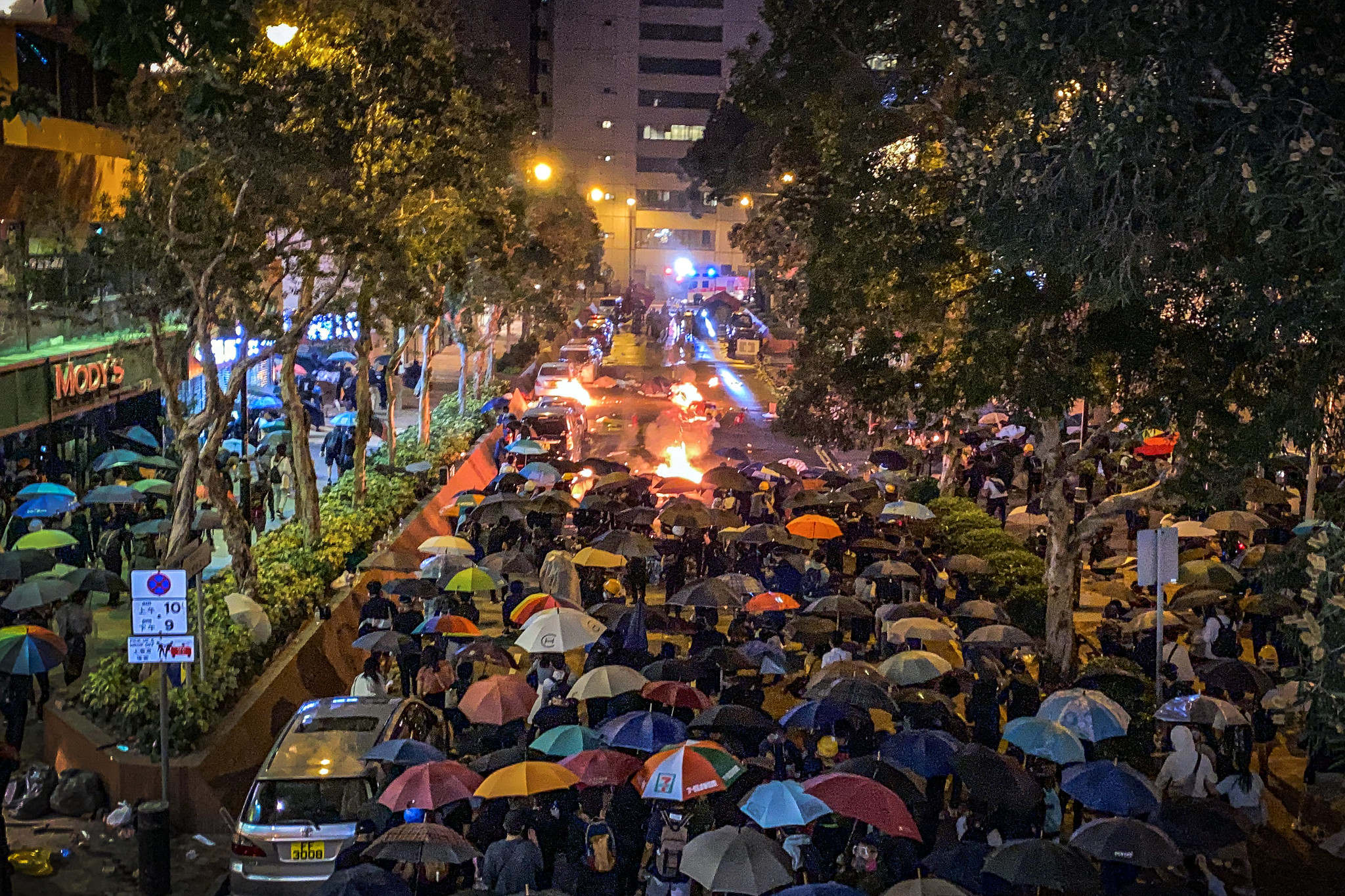
Protesters trying to break police cordon in Tsim Sha Tsui to get near the campus

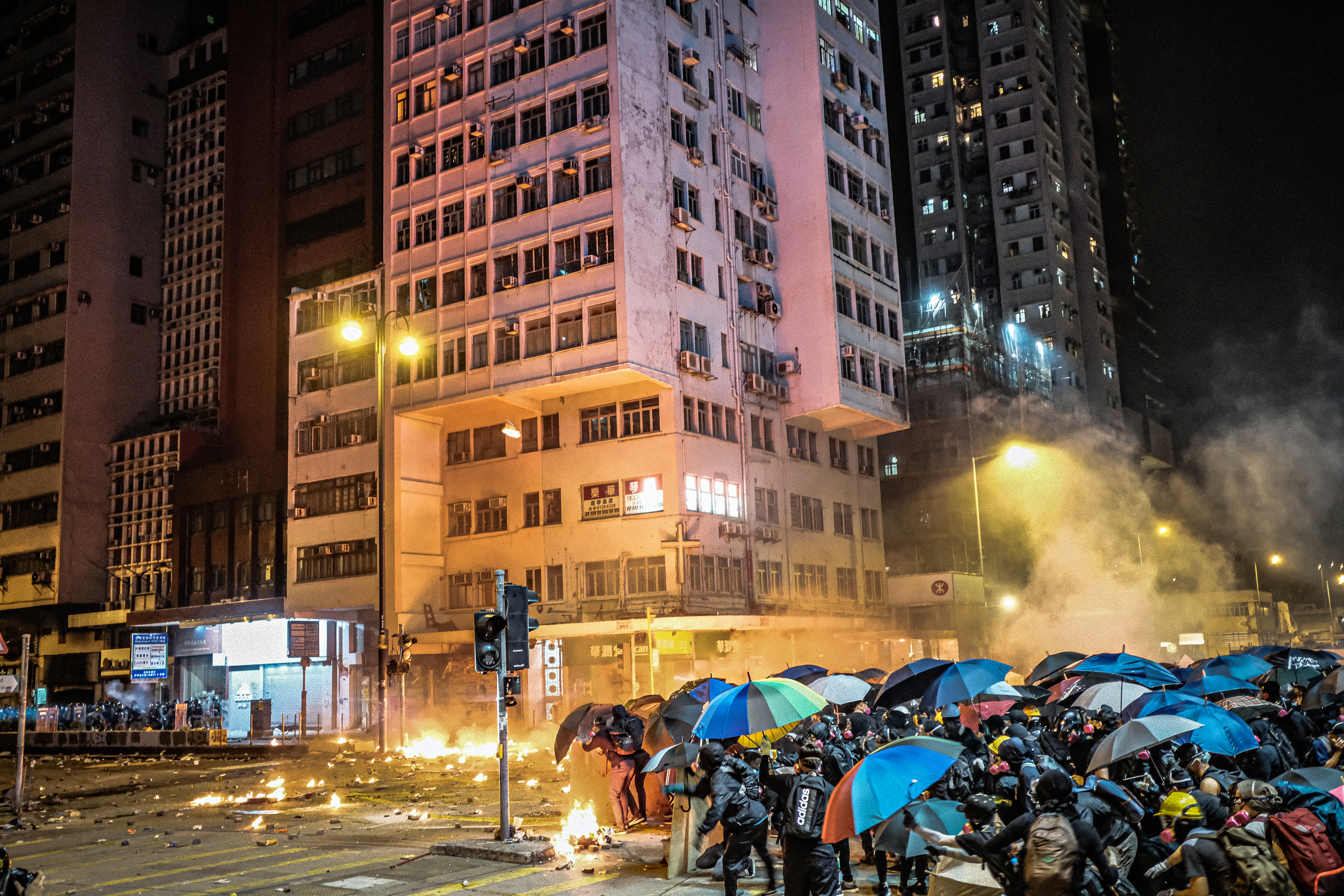
Police firing tear gas at protesters attempting to reach the cordon

== 19–27 November ==
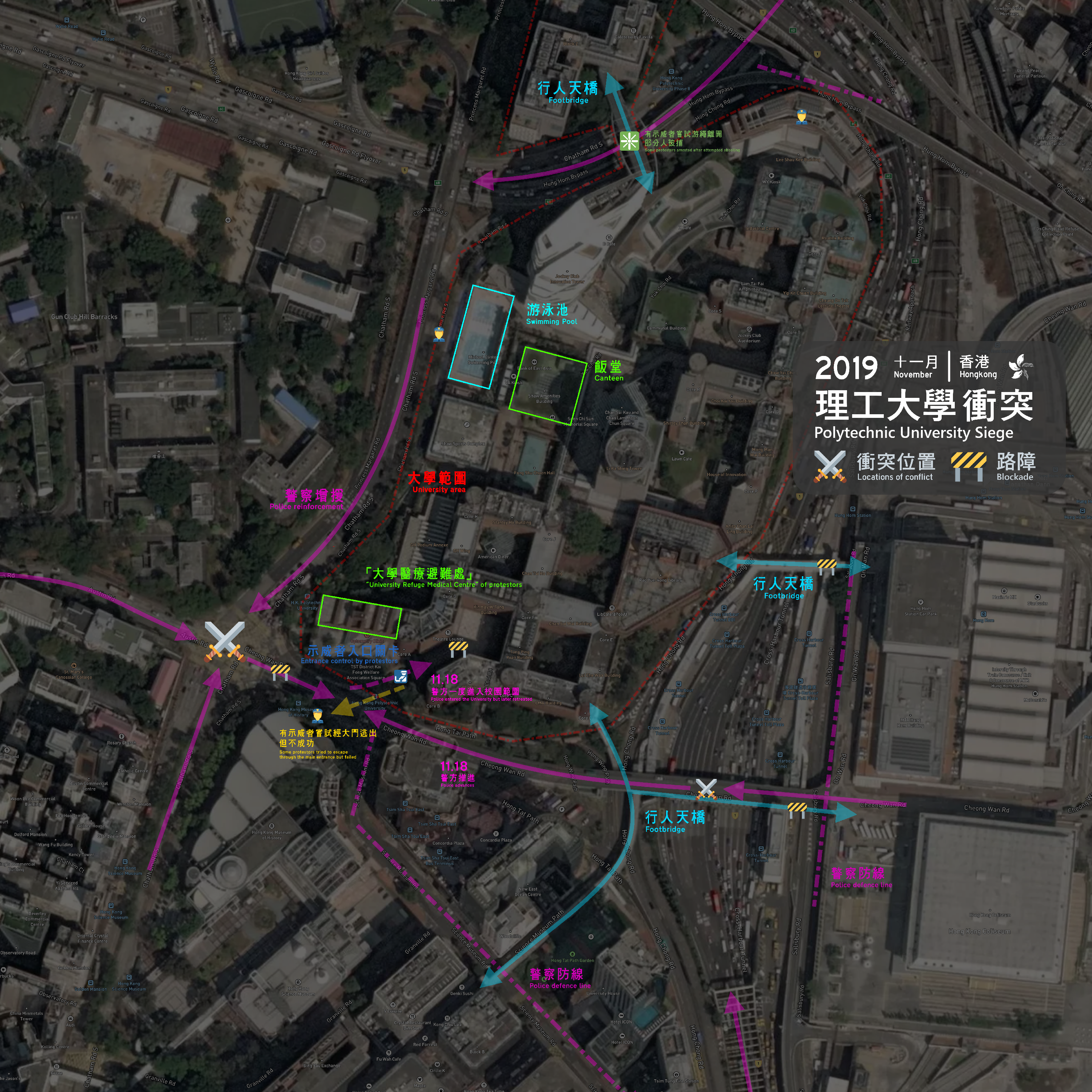
Map of the siege

Riot police trapped protesters inside the university as the standoff continued, with students desperate to escape from campus. Some fled by ziplining from one of the university's bridges, or in some cases, through sewers. The protesters reportedly had 'no way to leave'. The number of protesters trapped inside the building was disputed, with police putting their number at around 80–100 while protesters claimed the number was around 200.

Throughout the following days, more protesters from PolyU surrendered to police. The siege continued into 23 November, with around 50 protesters remaining. The campus's hygiene quickly deteriorated, and the protesters inside reported being mentally and physically weak.

== 28–29 November: End of the siege ==
Amid dwindling numbers of protesters in the university, the police entered on 28 November to look for stragglers and to clear the premises of hazardous materials. After a two-day search that failed to find any holdouts, the police lifted the cordon on 29 November. The university remained closed until the campus was deemed safe, even as petrol bombs and other weapons continued to be found on campus. More than 4,000 petrol bombs including about 600 tied to portable propane bottles were discovered. Around 1,300 people were arrested in and around PolyU over the course of the siege, and around 300 were sent to hospitals.

== Charges and convictions ==
On 15 May 2020, 14 people were formally charged with rioting, while another remained wanted by the police. All of these protesters were originally arrested during a police dispersal operation at the campus on 18 November 2019. In addition to the rioting charges, five of the group were charged with other offences, including possession of an offensive weapon in a public place. On 15 January 2022, seven of the arrested were sentenced to jail terms between 38 and 40 months, while two who were 17 and 18 years old at the time of the offence were sent to a training centre. Appeal bids by two of the group against their 38-month sentences were rejected by court on 23 March 2023.

On 9 September 2022, a female student who had entered a guilty plea for rioting the preceding month was also sent to a training centre. On 21 December, three protesters were sentenced to 24 months in prison for unlawful assembly and one additional protester was sentenced to 15 months for possessing an offensive weapon, both in the vicinity of the campus. On 11 February 2023, Alvin Cheng was sentenced to three years and eight months in prison on a rioting charge added by prosecution mid-way through the trial; local media reported that seven others were sentenced to between 7 and 13 months for attempting to help protesters escape the besieged campus, three of whom had pleaded guilty to the perverting public justice charge. On 22 March, the Department of Justice lodged an appeal seeking for tougher sentences for five protesters who had been sentenced to between 15 and 18 months in January for rioting near PolyU. The judge who had handed out the sentence had mentioned a plea deal of some defendants with the prosecution, which had led to their sentence being based only on a brief clash of eight minutes on 18 November 2019. A 20-year-old man was sentenced on 27 March 2023 to a training centre after having been found guilty of rioting in Yau Ma Tei to support the besieged protesters on 18 November 2019, when he was 17. He had written two mitigation letters. The judge said that he was a "demonstration of a young person" who had been "swayed by their peers". On 18 June 2024, seventeen protesters who had attempted to flee PolyU were sentenced to jail terms; four of them, who had pleaded guilty to rioting and were, as the only ones, not convicted of perverting the course of justice were each jailed for three years and eight months, while eight others who had not pleaded guilty were jailed for 70 months, except for one who was a minor at the time of the offence and received 60 months. Four others received jail sentences of 20 months for perverting the course of justice; another one received two years as he was additionally convicted of dangerous driving. Two defendants had been sentenced to a training centre. On 26 June, five men were rearrested; on 11 July, the five were charged with rioting, and one in addition with damaging property. On 18 July, twelve defendants aged between 22 and 32 who had been intercepted in Yau Ma Tei on 18 November 2019, and who had pleaded guilty to rioting, were sentenced to between three years and 40 months. The last one of the 17 cases relating to the 213 protesters arrested on the night of 18 November 2019 and charged with rioting concluded on 16 September 2024, with eight protesters receiving jail terms between 50 months and 4.5 years.

== Responses ==
=== Hong Kong Polytechnic University ===
Teng Jin-guang, president of Polytechnic University, released a video early on 18 November to explain his disappearance and asked protesters to leave peacefully. In a video lasting 1:08 released by the Polytechnic University's Public Relations Department, he claimed that he had been communicating with police since the afternoon of 17 November and because the police did not suggest he go to the campus, he decided not to appear at the campus but instead release the video. He further claimed that police promised a temporary suspension on the use of force on condition the protesters will do the same. He also said police promised him that protesters could leave the campus peacefully and he himself would accompany any student to the police station and ensure their case will be fairly processed. Teng said that the government shall bear overall responsibility and claimed the university was a victim since only around 50 radical protesters were students from the university.

=== China ===
Hu Xijin, the chief editor of Global Times, a Chinese state-owned tabloid, urged for violent protesters to be shot and advocated for immunity from charges for the police in the case of a fatal shooting.

=== United Kingdom ===
A spokesperson for Prime Minister Boris Johnson said that the UK government remained "seriously concerned" about events in Hong Kong and urged for "calm and restraint".

Malcolm Rifkind, former UK Secretary of State for Foreign and Commonwealth Affairs, urged Hong Kong Chief Executive Carrie Lam to order the police not to use live ammunition, and urged students who had engaged in violence to stop.

== See also ==
- 2019 November shooting incident in Sai Wai Ho
- Siege of the Chinese University of Hong Kong
