= Cecilia Lo =

American biologist

Cecilia W. Lo
- 羅聞亞
- Born: Lo Wen-ya; 1952 (age 73–74); Taiwan
- Education: Massachusetts Institute of Technology (BS); Rockefeller University (PhD)
- Spouse: Rocky Tuan
- Scientific career
- Fields: Developmental biology
- Workplaces: University of Pittsburgh

Cecilia Wen-ya Lo (Chinese: 羅聞亞) is a professor and the F. Sargent Cheever Chair of Developmental Biology at the University of Pittsburgh. Her research focuses on the study of congenital heart defects.

== Education ==
Lo received her bachelor's degree in biology in 1974 from the Massachusetts Institute of Technology, where she worked with David Baltimore. She received her Ph.D. in 1979 from Rockefeller University.

== Academic career ==
After a period on the faculty at the University of Pennsylvania, Lo joined the National Heart, Lung, and Blood Institute (NHLBI), one of the United States National Institutes of Health, to serve as chief of the Laboratory of Developmental Biology in 2001. Three years later, she became the director of the NHLBI's Genetics and Developmental Biology Center. In 2009, she and her husband, fellow NIH researcher Rocky Tuan, were recruited to the University of Pittsburgh. Lo became the founding chair of the newly established Department of Developmental Biology and is the F. Sargent Cheever professor.

== Research ==
Lo's research focuses on the genetics and developmental biology of congenital heart defects. Her research group relies on mouse models for investigation of genetic causes of congenital heart disease and also engages in translational research. They have developed particular interest in the functional role of cilia in heart development and in contributions of genetic defects in ciliary function to clinical outcomes, especially with respect to cases of heterotaxy.

Lo and Tuan co-edited a three-volume book titled Developmental Biology Protocols.
