= Rocky Tuan =

Hong Kong medical researcher and bioengineer

Rocky Tuan Sung-chi
- 段崇智
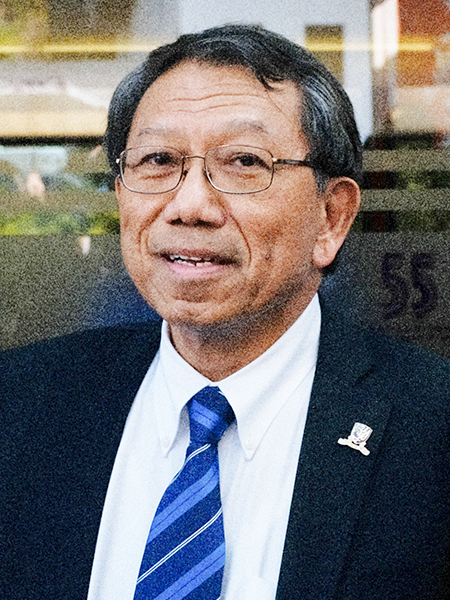
- Tuan in 2019

8th Vice-Chancellor and President of the Chinese University of Hong Kong
- In office 1 January 2018 – 8 January 2025
- Chancellor: Carrie Lam; John Lee
- Preceded by: Joseph Sung
- Succeeded by: Dennis Lo

Personal details
- Born: Tuan Sung-chi; 3 May 1951 (age 75) Hong Kong
- Spouse: Cecilia Lo
- Education: Berea College (BS); Rockefeller University (PhD)
- Scientific career
- Fields: Tissue engineering
- Workplaces: University of Pennsylvania; Thomas Jefferson University; National Institute of Arthritis and Musculoskeletal and Skin Diseases; University of Pittsburgh; Chinese University of Hong Kong
- Thesis: Calcium Binding Protein of Chick Chorioallantoic Membrane (1977)
- Doctoral advisor: Zanvil Cohn

Rocky Tuan Sung-chi (Chinese: 段崇智; Jyutping: dyun6 sung4 zi3; pinyin: Duàn Chóngzhì) is a Hong Kong medical researcher and bioengineer who served as the vice-chancellor and president of the Chinese University of Hong Kong (CUHK) from 2018 to 2025. Prior to his vice-chancellorship, Tuan served as distinguished visiting professor and director of the Institute for Tissue Engineering and Regenerative Medicine.

Tuan had been on the faculty at the University of Pittsburgh (Pitt) where he held a number of roles, including Arthur J. Rooney Sr. Professor of Sports Medicine, the executive vice chair of the department of orthopaedic surgery, and professorship in the department of bioengineering. He was the director of the Center for Military Medicine Research and an associate director of the McGowan Institute for Regenerative Medicine. Tuan continues to serve as the director of Center for Cellular and Molecular Engineering at Pitt, despite his current academic position in Hong Kong. For the 2018 fiscal year, he was one of the top 25 highest-paid employees at Pitt.

Tuan's research efforts focus on bioengineering applied to the musculoskeletal system.

== Education ==
Born in Hong Kong to Republic of China Army veterans, Tuan completed primary and secondary education at St. Joseph's Anglo-Chinese School, and then attended briefly the Queen's College without sitting the matriculation examination. He received his B.A. degree in chemistry from Berea College in Kentucky in 1972. He received his Ph.D. degree in Biochemistry and Cell Biology from Rockefeller University in New York City in 1977, supervised by Zanvil Cohn. He continued his postdoctoral research at Rockefeller and then began a postdoctoral fellowship at Harvard Medical School, first with Melvin J. Glimcher and later with Jerome Gross.

== Academic career ==
Tuan began his independent research career in 1980 when he joined the department of biology at the University of Pennsylvania. In 1988, he moved to Thomas Jefferson University, where he held joint appointments in the departments of orthopaedic surgery and biochemistry and molecular biology. He served as the director of orthopaedic research and vice chair of the department, and later took on the role of academic director of the institution's MD-PhD joint degree program. He also worked to develop a Ph.D. program in cell and tissue engineering, launched in 1997 and noted as the first such program in the US.

In 2001 Tuan left Jefferson to take an intramural research position at the National Institute of Arthritis and Musculoskeletal and Skin Diseases (NIAMS), one of the United States National Institutes of Health, where he became chief of the newly established Cartilage Biology and Orthopaedics Branch. Eight years later, he and his wife, fellow NIH scientist Cecilia Lo, were recruited to the University of Pittsburgh, where Tuan joined the departments of orthopaedic surgery and bioengineering and became the founding director of the newly established Center for Cellular and Molecular Engineering. He was appointed the Arthur J. Rooney Sr. Professor of Sports Medicine in 2010. Two years later, he assumed the directorship of the University of Pittsburgh's Center for Military Medicine Research and associate directorship of the McGowan Institute for Regenerative Medicine.

Tuan is a founding editor-in-chief of the scientific journal Stem Cell Research & Therapy and the editor of Birth Defects Research Part C: Embryo Today. He and Lo co-edited a three-volume book titled Developmental Biology Protocols.

=== Presidency at CUHK ===
In 2017, Tuan was appointed as the eighth vice-chancellor and president of the Chinese University of Hong Kong (CUHK). He took up the post in January 2018.

During the 2019–20 Hong Kong protests, Tuan was initially condemned by CUHK students for failing to criticise alleged police brutality, but later won plaudits after an evening-long discussion with students in public and private. On 18 October 2019, Tuan released an open letter in which he detailed some of the alleged police abuses that he had heard from his students, calling these "serious allegations from a human rights point of view" and urging the police to protect the rights of those arrested. He said he would write to Chief Executive Carrie Lam requesting an independent investigation of his students' cases outside existing mechanisms. This earned Tuan the condemnation of several police groups, who wrote that CUHK had "reduced itself to a hub of anti-China, Hong Kong independence forces". Later in December, Times Higher Education subsequently named Tuan as one of the world's most influential academics, citing that he has reached out to students, called for an end to violence, and "stood up for his campus and students [...] despite being criticised by establishment figures".

In November 2023, the Legislative Council of Hong Kong amended the Chinese University of Hong Kong Ordinance, reducing the university's governing council from 55 to 34 members and substantially decreasing internal representation. The reforms were opposed by members of the university community, who argued that they could weaken university autonomy.

The restructured council subsequently dismissed vice-president and university secretary Eric Ng Shu-pui, who had signed a petition opposing the reforms. In January 2024, Tuan announced that he would resign with effect from January 2025. He said that the implementation of the new governance structure made it an appropriate time for CUHK to select a new vice-chancellor and president.

Tuan was succeeded as vice-chancellor and president on 8 January 2025, following an earlier resignation. He was succeeded by Dennis Lo.

== Research ==
Tuan's research group focuses on bioengineering and tissue regeneration as applied to the musculoskeletal system, with an interest in translational research. Tuan's group has expertise in the study of adult stem cells and in the development of the musculoskeletal system. Among their efforts is a research project aimed at using 3D printing technology to restore function of joints damaged by diseases such as osteoarthritis, and work funded in 2016 to study model systems on the International Space Station.

== Other ==
Tuan was the former mentor of University of Rochester undergraduate Annie Le, who later was a doctoral student at Yale University until her murder in 2009.

== Awards and honors ==
- Elected to the College of Fellows of the American Institute for Medical and Biological Engineering, 2000
- Marshall R. Urist Award, Orthopaedic Research Society, 2004
- Carnegie Science Center Life Sciences Award, 2016
- Clemson Award for Contributions to the Literature, Society for Biomaterials, 2016

Academic offices
Preceded by Joseph Sung	8th Vice-Chancellor of the Chinese University of Hong Kong; 2018 - 2025	Succeeded by Dennis Lo
