= Noninvasive prenatal testing =

Medical procedure

- Other names: NIPT
- Specialty: Medical diagnosis, obstetrics and gynaecology

Noninvasive prenatal testing (NIPT) is a method used to determine the risk for the fetus being born with certain chromosomal abnormalities, such as trisomy 21, trisomy 18 and trisomy 13. This testing analyzes small DNA fragments that circulate in the blood of a pregnant woman. Unlike most DNA found in the nucleus of a cell, these fragments are not found within the cells, instead they are free-floating, and so are called cell free fetal DNA (cffDNA). These fragments usually contain less than 200 DNA building blocks (base pairs) and arise when cells die, and their contents, including DNA, are released into the bloodstream. CffDNA derives from placental cells and is usually identical to fetal DNA. Analysis of cffDNA from placenta provides the opportunity for early detection of certain chromosomal abnormalities without harming the fetus.

== Background ==
Non-Invasive prenatal testing, or NIPT, is a simple blood draw that screens for chromosomal abnormalities of a fetus while still in utero. When this screening was first performed it was used to determine the sex of a fetus, now it is also used to find aneuploidies in fetal DNA. Aneuploidies are disorders in which a fetus has the incorrect number of chromosomes, either too many or not enough. The use of ultrasound and biochemical markers to detect aneuploidies is usually done in the first and / or second trimester of pregnancy. Aneuploidies is when a fetus retains an abnormal amount of haploid cells from their parents. However, both of these approaches have a high rate of false positive results of 2–7%. If these tests indicate an increased risk of aneuploidy, then invasive diagnostic testing is used, such as amniocentesis or chorionic villus sampling. Many women, however, feel uncomfortable with the invasive testing, because of the risk associated with miscarriage, which is around 0.5%. Noninvasive prenatal testing is an intermediate step between prenatal screening and invasive diagnostic testing. The only physical risk associated with the procedure is the blood draw and there is no risk of miscarriage.

NIPT works by sampling cffDNA, which are small fragments of fetal blood DNA that comes from the placenta of the mother and flows in her blood vessels. Circulating cffDNA can be detected in maternal blood between the 5th and the 7th week of gestational age, however more fetal DNA is available for analysis usually after 10 weeks, because the amount of fetal DNA increases over time. cffDNA, RNA and intact fetal cells can all be used to assess the genetic status of the fetus non-invasively. Recent advances in DNA sequencing, such as massively parallel sequencing (MPS) and digital polymerase chain reaction (dPCR), are currently under exploration for the detection of chromosomal aneuploidies via NIPT/NIPS.

Since 2014, noninvasive testing has identified aneuploidies in chromosomes 13, 16, 18, 21, 22, X and Y, including Down syndrome (caused by trisomy 21), Edwards syndrome (caused by trisomy 18), Patau syndrome (caused by trisomy 13), as well as sex chromosome aneuploidies, such as Turner syndrome (45, X) and Klinefelter syndrome (47, XXY). NIPT can also detect congenital heart disease such as atrioventricular septal defect, which can also be a side effect in the aforementioned chromosomal conditions. These methods of cffDNA sequencing have sensitivity and specificity rates greater than 99% in identifying Trisomy 21. Sensitivity and specificity rates are lower for other aneuploidies, such as trisomy 18 (97–99% and > 99%, respectively), trisomy 13 (87–99% and > 99%, respectively), and 45, X (92–95% and 99%, respectively). The low false positive rate (1–3%) is one of the advantages of NIPT which allows pregnant women to avoid invasive procedures. In the UK the Advertising Standards Authority has stated that one should not quote "Detection Rate" figures unless the figures are accompanied by (i.e. alongside) a robust "Positive Predictive Value" figure; and a clear explanations about what both figures mean.

NIPT can determine paternity and may be able to determine fetal sex earlier in gestation than previous tests such as ultrasounds. It is recommended that the test be performed towards the end of the first trimester to the beginning of the second trimester, when there is enough cffDNA circulating in the mother's bloodstream to be detectable. If the test is performed too early the test is more likely to yield a false negative result because there is not enough cffDNA in the sample. False negative results for NIPT would indicate that the fetus does not have a genetic abnormality when it actually does. It is also used to determine fetal Rhesus D, which can prevent mothers who are Rhesus D negative from undergoing unnecessary prophylactic treatment. Finally, it is used to detect genetic mutations, such as duplications or microdeletions, including 1p, 5p, 15q, 22q, 11q, 8q, and 4p. The sensitivity and specificity of these tests, however, for most have not yet been validated.

The Natera SMART study however has shown that most cases of 22q11.2 deletion can be detected using SNP-based NIPT/NIPS (Panorama) including smaller nested deletions whilst still maintaining a low false positive rate. Single nucleotide polymorphism (SNP) NIPT can also detect Triploidy and can differentiate between maternal and "fetal" DNA which reduces the redraw rate and allows determination of gender for each fetus in twin pregnancies and can be done from 9 weeks of pregnancy.

For micro deletions such as DiGeorge syndrome, 1p36 deletion, Cri-du-chat syndrome, Wolf-Hirschhorn syndrome, Prader-Willi and Angelman syndromes, positive results can be incorrect as much as 85% of the time, according to a New York Times investigation.

There is some ethical debate surrounding NIPT and eugenics, because the results of this test can lead to parents opting for abortion if the fetus tests positive for a genetic disorder.
