= Clinical Chemistry (journal) =

- Discipline: Clinical chemistry, laboratory medicine
- Language: English
- Edited by: Nader Rifai

Publication details
- Former name(s): Clinical Chemist
- History: 1955-present
- Publisher: American Association for Clinical Chemistry (United States)
- Frequency: Monthly
- Impact factor: 8.327 (2020)

Standard abbreviations
- ISO 4: Clin. Chem.

Indexing
- CODEN: CLCHAU
- ISSN: 0009-9147 (print); 1530-8561 (web)
- OCLC no.: 01554929

Links
- Journal homepage; Online access; Online archive

Clinical Chemistry is a peer-reviewed medical journal covering the field of clinical chemistry. It is the official journal of the American Association for Clinical Chemistry. The journal was first published in 1955 on a bi-monthly basis "to raise the level at which chemistry is practiced in the clinical laboratory"; monthly publication commenced in 1964. The editor-in-chief is Nader Rifai (Harvard Medical School).

== Abstracting and indexing ==
The journal is abstracted and indexed in PubMed/MEDLINE and the Science Citation Index. According to the Journal Citation Reports, the journal has a 2020 impact factor of 8.327.
