= Association for Diagnostics & Laboratory Medicine =

Global scientific society

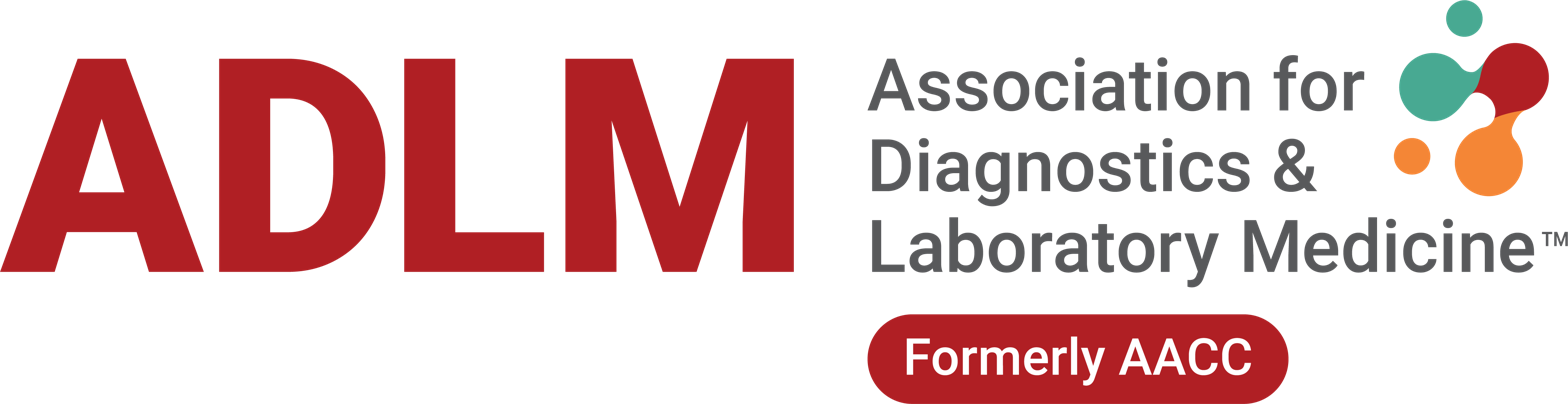
- Society logo
- Abbreviation: ADLM
- Formation: 1948; 78 years ago
- Purpose: Academic
- Headquarters: Washington, D.C., USA
- Members: 8,000 (2015)
- President: Octavia M. Peck Palmer
- Website: www.myadlm.org
- Formerly called: American Association for Clinical Chemistry

The Association for Diagnostics & Laboratory Medicine (formerly known as the American Association for Clinical Chemistry or AACC) is a global scientific society dedicated to clinical laboratory science and its application to healthcare. ADLM's current president is Dr. Stanley F. Lo, PhD, FAAC, and the association headquarters are located in Washington, D.C. (United States).

== ADLM Members ==
ADLM's approximately 8,000 members come from all areas of lab medicine—clinical and research laboratories, diagnostic companies, government agencies, original equipment manufacturers, and more. Collectively they develop and run lab tests and lab instruments used throughout healthcare. They also manage labs, conduct research involving biomarkers, and promote accurate diagnostic testing. ADLM represents the diverse interests of a global lab community: its members come from 110 countries and hold the spectrum of lab-related professional degrees, certifications, and credentials.

== ADLM Annual Scientific Meeting ==
ADLM holds several scientific conferences each year, the largest of which is the ADLM Annual Scientific Meeting & Clinical Lab Expo. First held in 1949, this educational meeting and technology exposition is an event in the field of laboratory medicine, attracting an average of 20,000 participants.

== Clinical Chemistry ==
ADLM's journal is a journal of clinical laboratory science.

== The Journal of Applied Laboratory Medicine ==
Launched by ADLM in 2016, it is an international, peer-reviewed publication.

== Clinical Laboratory News ==
Published since 1975.

== Controversy ==
At the 68th AACC Annual Scientific Meeting in 2016, Elizabeth Holmes, CEO and founder of Theranos, spoke at what AACC described as a “special session.” Holmes, who the Centers for Medicare and Medicaid Services (CMS) had recently been banned from owning, operating or directing a blood testing service for a period of two years, was invited to present scientific data on her company's much discussed Edison device. Instead, Holmes took the opportunity to unveil a new product dubbed miniLab. Several people on the Theranos scientific advisory board were members of the association.

== COVID-19 pandemic ==
ADLM members who are frontline laboratory specialists also encounter significant challenges in carrying out such studies. Lack of product selection and research materials as well as personal protective equipment, known as PPE, are the most important of these barriers. In recognition of these obstacles to optimizing research ability, ADLM sent a letter to the Coronavirus Task Force advising the Task Force and White House to minimize supply chain issues, and to identify and organize tools such that doctors, nurses, laboratory personnel and other healthcare staff may do their jobs.

ADLM has produced instructional videos demonstrating serology, treatment of polymerase chain reaction (PCR), and more through research in the spotlight during the COVID-19 pandemic.
