= People Power–League of Social Democrats =

Progressive Democrats
- Founded: 2016
- Ideology: Direct democracy Populism; Factions: Social democracy Radical democracy
- Regional affiliation: Pro-democracy camp
- Legislative Council: 2 / 70 (2016)

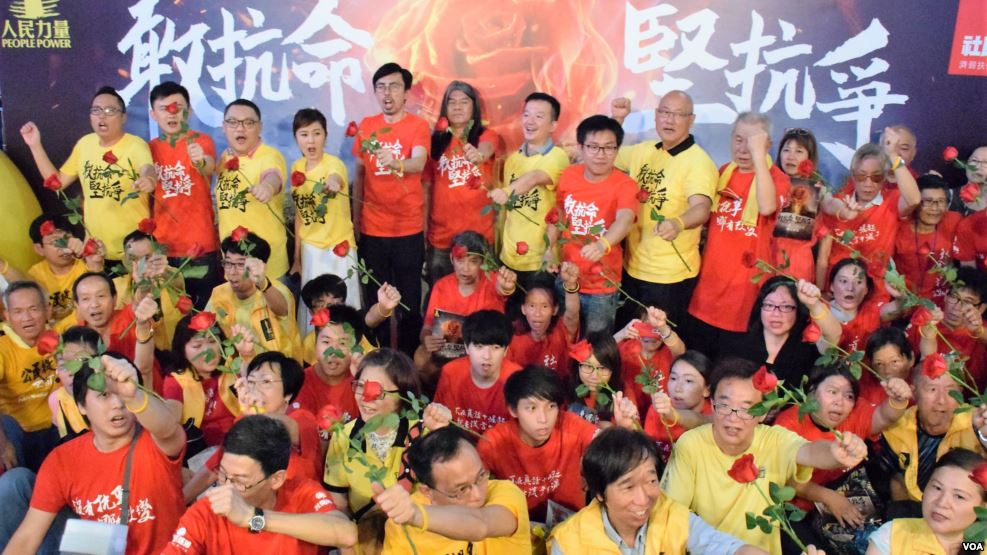
People Power and League of Social Democrats election rally in June 2016.

The People Power–League of Social Democrats, were two radical democratic parties that set up an electoral alliance for the 2016 Hong Kong Legislative Council election under the name "progressive democrats". It fielded a total of nine candidates to contest Legislative Council seats in the five geographical constituencies, in which two of the three incumbents were returned.

== Background ==
The League of Social Democrats (LSD) was established in 2006 with the social democratic and street action agenda. In 2008 Legislative Council election, three candidates, chairman Wong Yuk-man, Albert Chan Wai-yip and Leung Kwok-hung each won a seat and received 10 percent of the popular vote. In 2009, the League proposed a "Five Constituencies Resignation" to trigger a territory-wide by-election which could be seen as a referendum on the government's constitutional reform proposal. While it was joined by the professional-oriented pro-democratic Civic Party, it was opposed by the flagship Democratic Party. The by-election failed to realise a massive turnout and caused infighting in the pro-democratic camp as the Democrats negotiated with the Beijing government in secret.

In 2011, Wong Yuk-man and Albert Chan Wai-yip split away from the LSD over the interpersonal disputes and the stances on the spinning the Democratic Party in the 2011 District Council election after the 2012 constitutional reform package. The then chairman Andrew To Kwan-hang and his faction insisted a tolerant stance toward the Democratic Party while Wong strongly disagreed. About two hundred of their supporters joined Wong, leaving the LSD in disarray. They later formed the People Power with Power Voters supported by Stephen Shiu Yeuk-yuen, the owner of the Hong Kong Reporter, the re-grouped Frontier and the two pro-Taiwan organisations China Youth Organization and Democratic Alliance. In the 2012 Legislative Council election, the two parties won nearly 15 percent of the popular votes. Leung Kwok-hung and Raymond Chan Chi-chuen both won a seat in New Territories East while Wong Yeung-tat posed a challenge to Andrew To Kwan-hang in Kowloon East and eventually both lost to the pro-Beijing Paul Tse Wai-chun.

The relationship between the two parties became warmer as the legislators joined hand in filibustering against the government's bills. In May 2013, Wong Yuk-man left the People Power over the dispute with Stephen Shiu Yeuk-yuen, the owner of the Hong Kong Reporter and People Power's financial supporters over the Occupy Central plan. Wong and his protege Wong Yeung-tat later became the leaders for the localist cause and the relationship between the two factions remained bad.

After the 2014 Hong Kong protests, many radical localist groups calling for independence and militant protest style became a new challenge to the two traditional radical parties. In 2016 New Territories East by-election, the localist Hong Kong Indigenous candidate Edward Leung Tin-kei received 15 percent of the votes, which many of them might come from the LSD and PP supporters as scholars observed. The localist groups also considered to contest in the 2016 Legislative Council election.

== Alliance ==
In June 2016, the two parties joined hand and set up an electoral alliance under the name of "progressive democrats". The parties ruled out pursuing “Hong Kong independence”, which, the League's chairman Avery Ng Man-yuen rejected as “an impractical idea that leads Hong Kong to nowhere”. They recognised Beijing's full jurisdiction over Hong Kong but called for Hong Kong to be granted “genuine high degree of autonomy” under which Beijing only takes care of military defence and foreign affairs. They also called for accepting new migrants from the mainland, saying they should not be the scapegoats of Hong Kong people's hatred against the Beijing government. They plans to field a total of nine candidates to contest Legislative Council seats in the five geographical constituencies with the aim to win at least six seats in the legislature.

- Hong Kong Island: Christopher Lau Gar-hung (PP), Erica Yuen Mi-ming (PP)
- Kowloon West: Avery Ng Man-yuen (LSD), Derek Chan Tak-cheung (LSD)
- Kowloon East: Tam Tak-chi (PP)
- New Territories West: Raphael Wong Ho-ming (LSD), Albert Chan Wai-yip (PP)
- New Territories East: Leung Kwok-hung (LSD), Raymond Chan Chi-chuen (PP) (two separate lists)

== Results ==
The alliance won two seats in total with two incumbents Leung Kwok-hung and Chan Chi-chuen re-elected in the New Territories East. Retiring incumbent Albert Chan failed to help Wong Ho-ming to be elected despite him standing as a second candidate in the New Territories West. After the election, People Power chairwoman Erica Yuen resigned from the office for the election defeat.

== Performance in elections ==
=== Legislative Council elections ===
Election	Number of popular votes	% of popular votes	GC seats	FC seats	Total seats	+/−	Position
2016	156,019	7.20	2	0	2 / 70	▼1	8th
