= 2016 Hong Kong legislative election =

- 4 September 2016

All 70 seats to the Legislative Council 36 seats needed for a majority
- Opinion polls
- Registered: 3,779,085 (GC) ▲9.03%
- Turnout: 2,202,283 (58.28%) ▲5.23pp
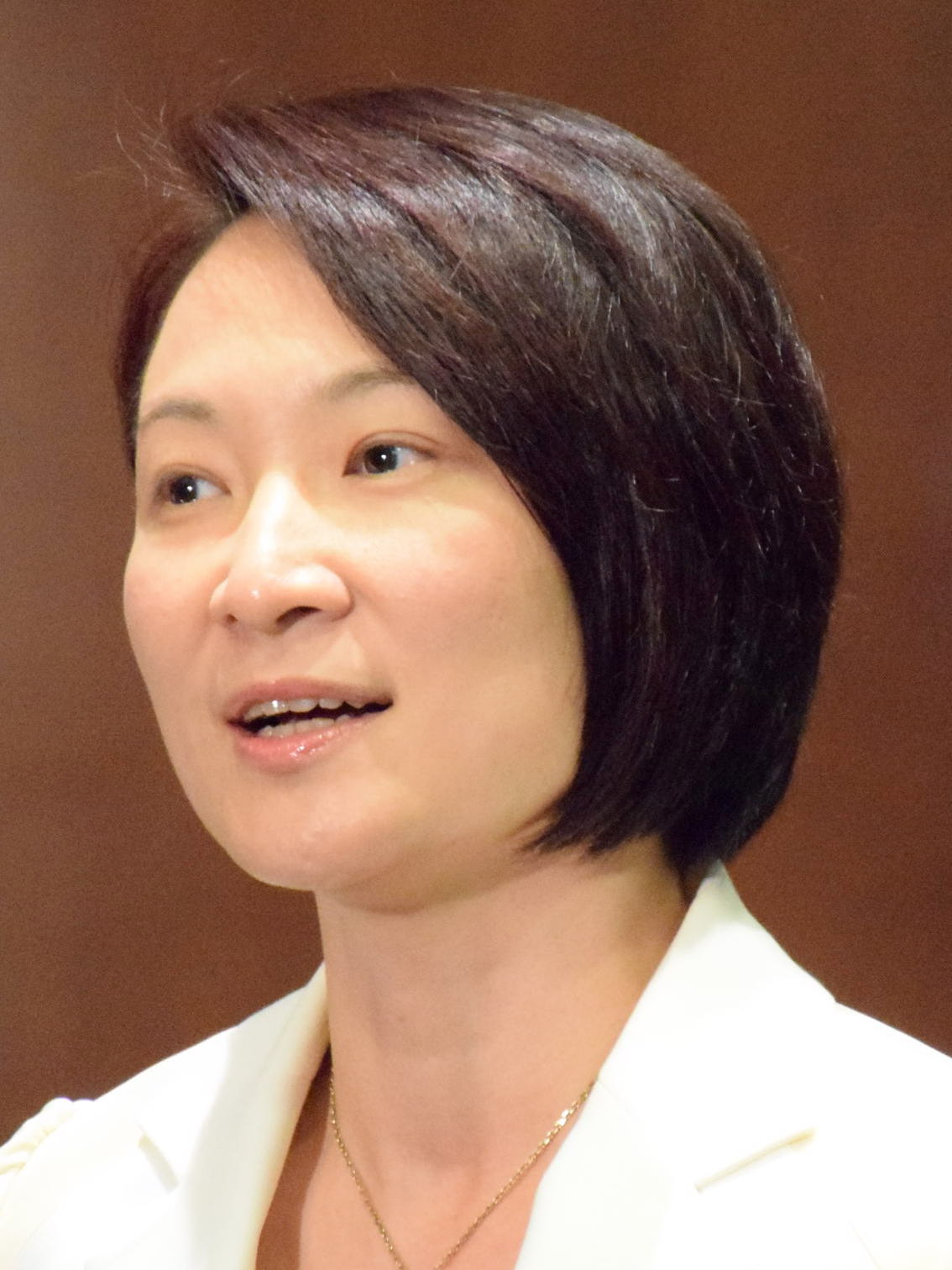

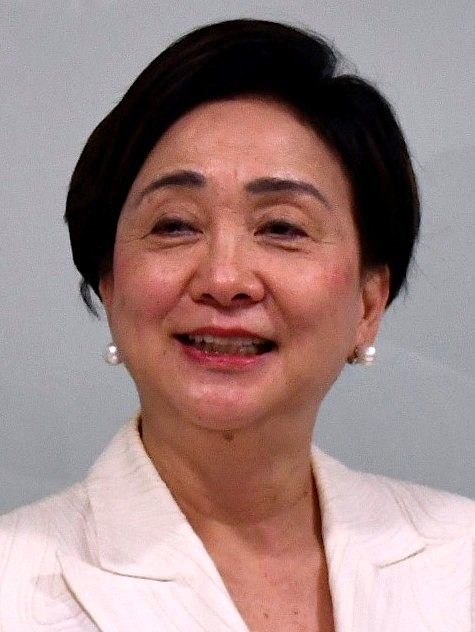

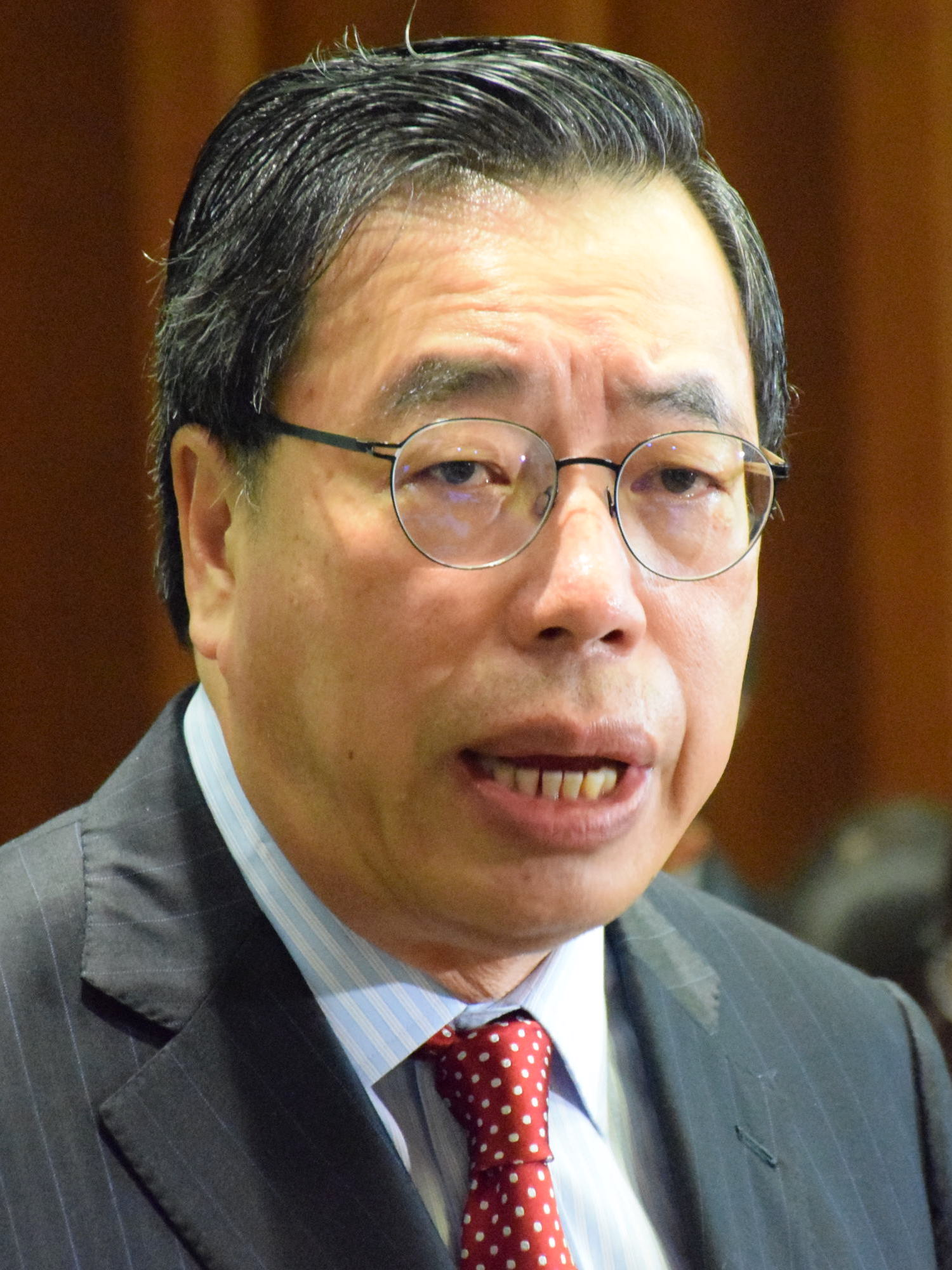

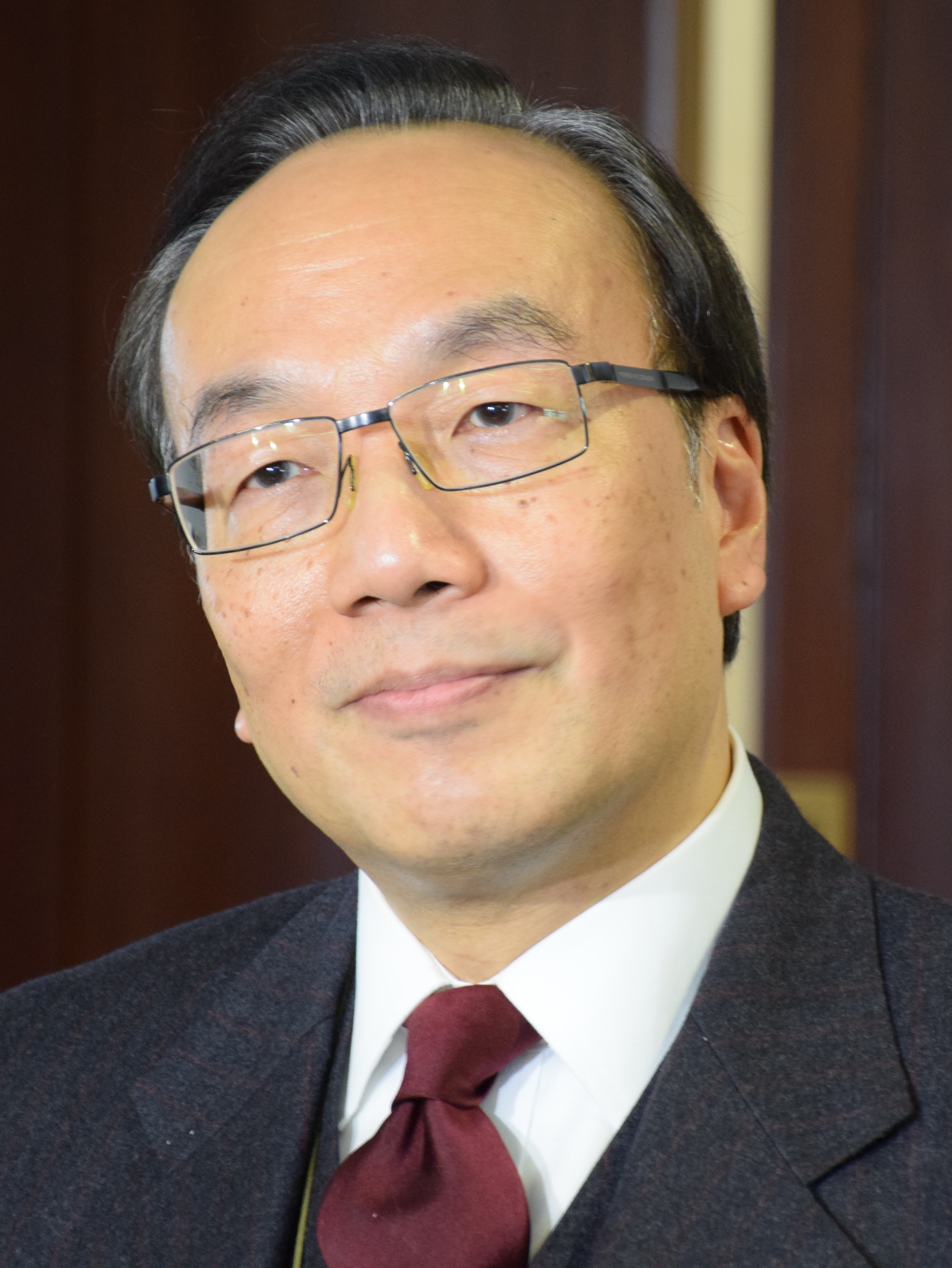

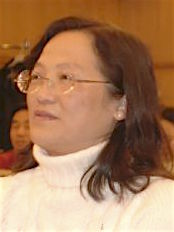

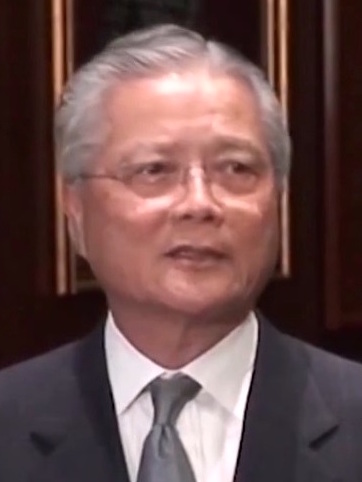

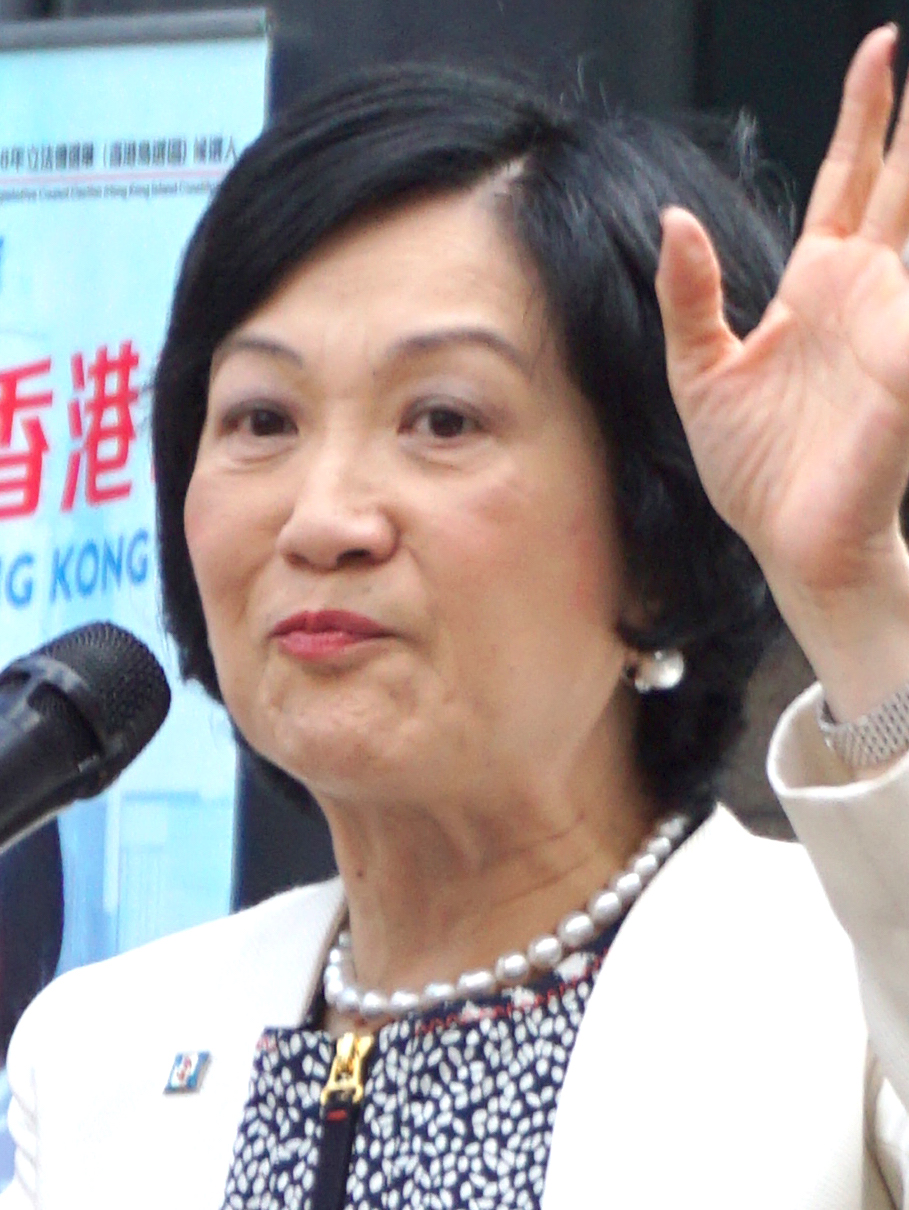

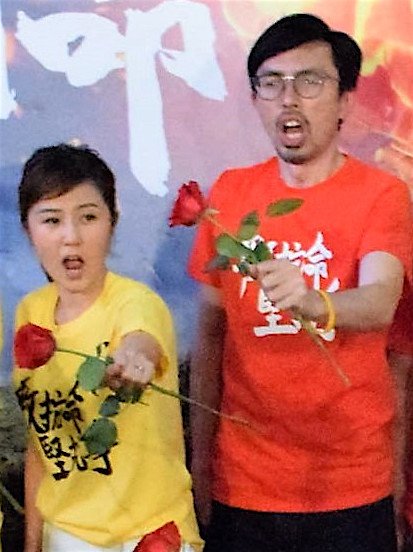

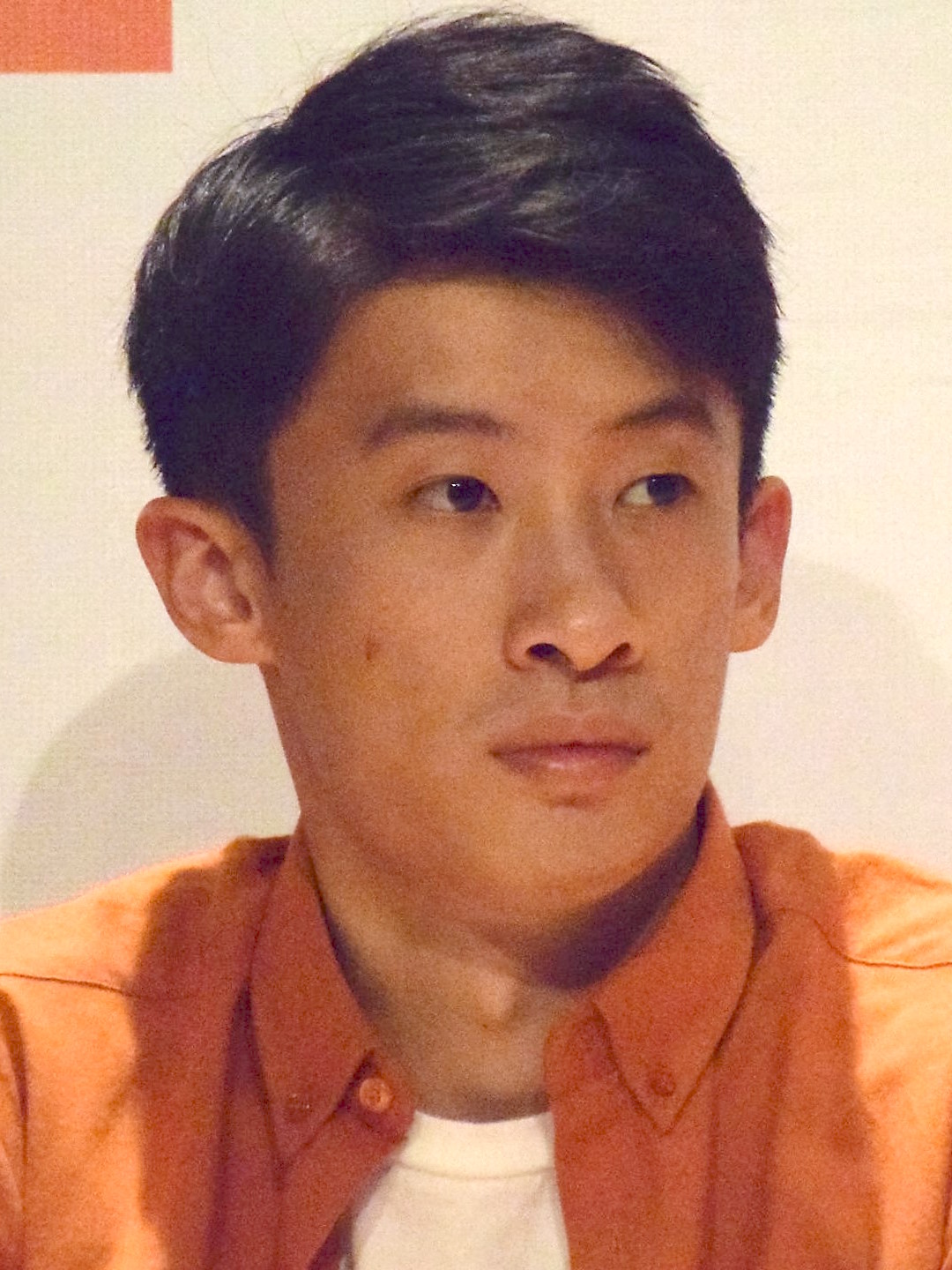
| | First party | Second party | Third party |
|---|---|---|---|
| Leader | Starry Lee | Emily Lau | Andrew Leung |
| Party | DAB | Democratic | BPA |
| Alliance | Pro-Beijing | Pan-democracy | Pro-Beijing |
| Leader's seat | District Council (Second) | New Territories East (lost seat) (Note: The candidate was not elected as he or she stood as a second candidate on the party list.) | Industrial (First) |
| Last election | 13 seats, 20.22% | 6 seats, 13.65% | New party |
| Seats won | 12 | 7 | 7 |
| Seat change | ▼1 | ▲1 | Steady |
| Popular vote | 361,617 | 199,876 | 49,745 |
| Percentage | 16.68% | 9.22% | 2.29% |
| Swing | ▼3.54pp | ▼4.43pp | N/A |
| | Fourth party | Fifth party | Sixth party |
| Leader | Alan Leong | Lam Shuk-yee | Vincent Fang |
| Party | Civic | FTU | Liberal |
| Alliance | Pan-democracy | Pan-Beijing | Pan-Beijing |
| Leader's seat | Kowloon East (lost seat) | Did not stand | Retired from Wholesale & Retail |
| Last election | 6 seats, 14.08% | 6 seats, 7.06% | 5 seats, 2.64% |
| Seats won | 6 | 5 | 4 |
| Seat change | Steady | ▼1 | ▼1 |
| Popular vote | 207,855 | 169,854 | 21,500 |
| Percentage | 9.59% | 7.83% | 0.99% |
| Swing | ▼4.49pp | ▲0.77pp | ▼1.70pp |
| | Seventh party | Eighth party | Ninth party |
| Leader | Regina Ip | Erica Yuen; Avery Ng | Baggio Leung |
| Party | NPP | PP/LSD | Youngspiration |
| Alliance | Pan-Beijing | Pan-democracy | ALLinHK |
| Leader's seat | Hong Kong Island | Ran in Hong Kong Island; Ran in Kowloon West (both defeated) | New Territories East |
| Last election | 2 seats, 3.76% | 4 seats, 14.59% | New party |
| Seats won | 3 | 2 | 2 |
| Seat change | ▲1 | ▼1 | ▲2 |
| Popular vote | 167,589 | 156,019 | 81,422 |
| Percentage | 7.73% | 7.20% | 3.75% |
| Swing | ▲3.97pp | ▼7.39pp (Note: Combined votes of the People Power and League of Social Democrats in 2012.) | N/A |
Party control before election
Pro-Beijing camp
Party control after election
Pro-Beijing camp

The 2016 Hong Kong Legislative Council election was held on 4 September 2016 for the 6th Legislative Council of Hong Kong (LegCo). A total of 70 members, 35 from geographical constituencies (GCs) and 35 from functional constituencies (FCs), were returned. The election came after the rejection of the 2016/2017 constitutional reform proposals which suggested the electoral method for the 2016 Legislative Council remains unchanged.

An unprecedented number of 2.2 million voters, 58 per cent of the registered electorate, turned out in the wake of the 2014 pro-democracy Occupy movement often dubbed as the "Umbrella Revolution" with the localists emerged as a new political force behind the pro-Beijing and pan-democracy camps by winning six seats in the geographical constituencies and gaining nearly 20 per cent of the vote share. Many new faces rose from the post-Occupy political forces got elected which was described as the "youthquake" by the media. Demosisto's Nathan Law, a 23-year-old Occupy student leader became the youngest candidate to be elected in history along with his allies Lau Siu-lai and Eddie Chu.

Baggio Leung and Yau Wai-ching from the radical localist groups Youngspiration, and Cheng Chung-tai of Civic Passion, also won seats after they were allowed to enter the race following the government controversially disqualifying six localists for their advocacy of Hong Kong independence. As a result, four pan-democrats lost their seats, namely, Neo Democrats' Gary Fan, as well as three veterans, Lee Cheuk-yan and Cyd Ho of the Labour Party and Frederick Fung of the Association for Democracy and People's Livelihood.

Many veteran pro-Beijing incumbents, including the LegCo president Jasper Tsang, also Chan Kam-lam and Tam Yiu-chung of the Democratic Alliance for the Betterment and Progress of Hong Kong's (DAB) and Chan Yuen-han of the Hong Kong Federation of Trade Unions (FTU) decided to step down, while pan-democrat heavyweights, including Civic Party leader Alan Leong, Democratic Party chairwoman Emily Lau and veterans Albert Ho and Sin Chung-kai, as well as pro-Beijing Liberal Party honorary chairman James Tien, chose to stand as second candidate to get their party's newcomers elected. Young Democrat Kwong Chun-yu received the most votes by winning nearly 500,000 votes in the District Council (Second) "super seat".

Together with the six post-Occupy radicals and localists, the anti-establishment forces won 29 out of 70 seats; managed to retain the majority in the geographical constituencies to block the pro-establishment camp's attempt to amend the rule of procedures to curb radicals' filibustering, as well as the opposition's crucial one-thirds minority to maintain the veto power on government's constitutional reform proposals.

These were the last fully free legislative elections to be held in Hong Kong prior to the national security law that was implemented in 2020 and the electoral changes in 2021.

== Background ==
=== Electoral reform failure and Umbrella Revolution ===
The election comes after the rejection of constitutional reform proposals of the Leung Chun-ying administration in mid-2015 meant the electoral method for the Legislative Council (LegCo) in 2016 was unchanged. On 31 August 2014, the National People's Congress Standing Committee (NPCSC) set limits for the 2016 Legislative Council and 2017 Chief Executive elections. While reaffirming the electoral method for the 2016 Legislative Council election remained unchanged, the 2014 NPCSC decision allowed the Chief Executive (CE) to be directly elected but "unpatriotic" candidates would have to be screened out by a Beijing-controlled nominating committee. In response to the NPCSC decision, the student activists staged a class boycott which led into a months-long large-scale occupy movement as proposed by the Occupy Central, which was referred as the "Umbrella Revolution".

The government proposals were overwhelmingly rejected in the Legislative Council following a failed walk-out by the pro-Beijing camp on 18 June 2015. In response, Chief Executive Leung Chun-ying urged the voters to "punish" the opposition democratic candidates by voting them out in the upcoming legislative election.

=== Emergence of new political forces ===
The emergence of new political groups led by young activists began to influence the political landscape: Edward Leung of Hong Kong Indigenous, a pro-independence localist group, received a better-than expected result in the New Territories East by-election in February 2016 by taking more than 66,000 votes and gaining about 15 percent of the total votes. After the election, Edward Leung claimed localism had become the third most important power grouping in Hong Kong politics alongside the pan-democracy and pro-Beijing camps. A day after the election, three localist groups, Wong Yuk-man's Proletariat Political Institute, Wong Yeung-tat's Civic Passion and Chin Wan's Hong Kong Resurgence Order, announced to run in the upcoming election.

On 10 April 2016, six localist groups which emerged after the 2014 Umbrella Revolution, Youngspiration, Kowloon East Community, Tin Shui Wai New Force, Cheung Sha Wan Community Establishment Power, Tsz Wan Shan Constructive Power and Tuen Mun Community, formed an electoral alliance under the name "ALLinHK" planned to field candidates in four of the five geographical constituencies with the agenda to put forward a referendum on Hong Kong's self-determination, while Hong Kong Indigenous and another new pro-independence Hong Kong National Party also stated that they would run in the upcoming election.

Also on 10 April 2016, the student leaders in the Umbrella Revolution, Joshua Wong, Oscar Lai and Agnes Chow of Scholarism and Nathan Law of the Hong Kong Federation of Students (HKFS) formed a new party called Demosistō and aimed to field candidates in Hong Kong Island and Kowloon East. The new party calls for referendum on Hong Kong's future after 2047 when the one country, two systems is supposed to expire.

Ronny Tong's Path of Democracy and Tik Chi-yuen's Third Side, the two new political groups which split from the Civic Party and Democratic Party respectively, seek a middle path between the pro-Beijing camp and pan-democracy camp on achieving democracy, with plans to field candidates in the geographical constituency election.

Political scientist Professor Ma Ngok believed the soaring number of political groups and candidates, which was the reflection of the increasing fragmentation of the pro-democracy camp, might split the pro-democracy votes.

=== ThunderGo plan ===
In early 2016, Occupy Central co-founder Benny Tai, who was inspired by the electoral victory the Democratic Progressive Party received in the 2016 Taiwan legislative election, mapped out a "ThunderGo plan" for pan-democrats to grab half of the seats in the Legislative Council election to increase political leverage in future political reform. He suggests the anti-establishment forces to field no more than 23 lists if their goal was to win 23 seats in the geographical constituencies, six tickets for nine-seat New Territories West and New Territories East, four tickets for six-seat Hong Kong Island and Kowloon West, and three for five-seat Kowloon East respectively. For the functional constituencies, Tai suggested that besides retaining the current six trade-based functional constituencies and three territory-wide directly elected District Council (Second) super seats, the camp needs to target three additional seats in Medical, Engineering and Architectural, Surveying, Planning and Landscape. The plan met with reservations from the very diverse interests within pro-democracy political parties, who could not agree on a united front. Tai's plan hit its setback when the Neo Democrats decided not to support the proposed coordinating mechanism for the District Council (Second) super seats in May.

Tai also worked on a "smart voters" system involving 25,000 voters who would indicate their preferences on an interactive poll via Telegram and would be informed of the popularity of candidates according to polls the day before the official vote and which would be updated through exit polling two and a half hours before polls closed. Such "smart voters" would delay voting until 8 pm and then be signalled to support candidates whose numbers were weaker instead wasting votes on stronger candidates who were already through.

== Pre-election issues ==
=== Leung Chun-ying's re-election ===
The pan-democracy camp campaigned to block Chief Executive Leung Chun-ying, whose popularity dropped to a new low, from serving a second term. Technology and media entrepreneur Ricky Wong Wai-kay, whose Hong Kong Television Network (HKTV) free-to-air television licence was denied by Leung's Executive Council in October 2013 and sparked public uproar and protests, also started his "ABC campaign" (Anyone but CY) by announcing Leung's exit as his key campaign platform. Wong was backed by the Liberal Party, a pro-Beijing party representing the business sector which had been at odds with the Chief Executive since the 2012 Chief Executive election when the Liberals openly opposed Leung.

On 28 July, President of the Legislative Council Jasper Tsang and Financial Secretary John Tsang both expressed interest in running for the Chief Executive in 2017 on different occasions. Political analysts said that the duo's moves would take some pressure off pro-Beijing camp preparing for the Legislative Council election as pro-Beijing candidates had struggled when asked in public if they supported Leung's re-election.

=== Causeway Bay bookseller disappearances ===
Lam Wing-kee, one of the five Causeway Bay booksellers who went missing from October 2015 returned to Hong Kong and revealed at a press conference in June 2016 that he was kidnapped at the China–Hong Kong border in October and put through eight months of mental torture. The controversy ignited fears that mainland law enforcement officers might have acted within the territory of Hong Kong and shook Hong Kong's confidence in the one country, two systems. Professor Lau Siu-kai, former head of the Hong Kong government's think tank, the Central Policy Unit, worried that more people might vote for pan-democracy camp in September's election.

=== Resignations of ICAC heads controversy ===
In July, acting head of the Independent Commission Against Corruption (ICAC) Rebecca Li Bo-lan resigned after she was removed from her position by ICAC commissioner Simon Peh Yun-lu, less than a year after he appointed her. The rare move amid speculation that Li was removed over an investigation into Chief Executive Leung Chun-ying's receipt of HK$50 million from Australian firm UGL. Less than a week later, long-serving ICAC principal investigator Dale Ko also resigned without any meaningful official explanation. The controversy sparked calls for a special Legislative Council investigation and raised fears about the reputation of the anti-corruption body.

=== Ban on pro-independence candidates controversy ===
On 14 July 2016 the Electoral Affairs Commission (EAC) announced its plan to require all candidates to sign an additional "confirmation form" in the nomination to declare their understanding of Hong Kong being an inalienable part of China as stipulated in the Basic Law, in response to many potential localist candidates advocating or promoting Hong Kong independence. The EAC states that anyone making a false declaration in the nomination form was liable to criminal sanction.

EAC returning officers also sent emails to several applicants who had not been confirmed as official candidates, including Hong Kong Indigenous' Edward Leung, Civic Passion's Alvin Cheng, Hong Kong National Party's Chan Ho-tin, to ask whether they would still advocate independence after submitting the nomination form. Those questions were claimed to be a factor to determine the validity of their nominations.

After the end of the nomination period, six localist candidates received emails from the EAC which said their nominations were "invalidated", which included Chan Ho-tin, Democratic Progressive Party's Yeung Ke-cheong, Nationalist Hong Kong's Nakade Hitsujiko, Conservative Party's Alice Lai Yee-man, Hong Kong Indigenous' Edward Leung and independent Chan Kwok-keung, although many of them had signed the additional confirmation form; all except Yeung had signed the declaration statement in the nomination form saying they would "uphold the Basic Law and pledge allegiance to the Hong Kong SAR" as required by the Legislative Council Ordinance. New Territories East constituency returning officer Cora Ho Lai-sheung rejected Edward Leung's nomination on the basis that she did not trust Leung "genuinely changed his previous stance for independence."

== Contesting parties and candidates ==
An unprecedented number of 289 validly nominated candidates contested in the election, two more than the previous election, after seven candidates were disqualified, six of whom due to their pro-independence stance, and two withdrew their candidatures. 84 lists with a total of 213 candidates contested the 35 geographical constituencies, while 55 candidates contested in the traditional functional constituencies, 43 of them ran for 18 seats in the functional constituencies. A total of 21 candidates belonging to 9 lists contested the five "super seats" in the District Council (Second) functional constituency.

=== Pro-Beijing camp ===
- Democratic Alliance for the Betterment and Progress of Hong Kong (DAB): The flagship Beijing-loyalist party fielded nine candidate lists in the geographical constituencies and District Council (Second) direct elections, two fewer than the 2012 election. Four veterans including the Legislative Council President Jasper Tsang and former party chairman Tam Yiu-chung stepped down from the office, while new faces Cheung Kwok-kwan and Wilson Or took up the candidacies in Hong Kong Island and Kowloon East. North District Councillor Lau Kwok-fan won a four-way intra-party primary to take up Ip Kwok-him's District Council (First) functional constituency. Incumbent Hong Kong Island legislator Christopher Chung who initially led a candidate list but was withdrawn by the party later protested against the party's decision, but later on accepted to be placed second on Cheung's list.
- Business and Professionals Alliance for Hong Kong (BPA): Six of the seven legislators from the pro-business party sought for re-election. The party honorary chairman Lau Wong-fat retired from the Heung Yee Kuk and was succeeded by his son Kenneth Lau uncontestedly, while party chairman Andrew Leung and Abraham Shek were also re-elected uncontestedly in their trade-based constituencies. The party's sole geographical constituency legislator Priscilla Leung sought for her third term in Kowloon West.
- Hong Kong Federation of Trade Unions (FTU): The pro-labour federation rose as the third largest party in the last election in 2012. The FTU remained its five tickets in four geographical constituencies and District Council (Second) "super seat", as well as two candidates in the three-seat Labour functional constituency. Veteran Chan Yuen-han stepped down from the "super seat" and was taken up by Wong Kwok-hing, while Wong's Hong Kong Island seat was taken up by Kwok Wai-keung from the Labour functional constituency.
- Liberal Party: The pro-business party had been vocal for its criticism against the Leung Chun-ying administration and positioned itself as the anti-Leung voice within the pro-establishment camp. The party honorary chairman James Tien initially planned to stand in Hong Kong Island but later stood in New Territories East as the second place with the party's rising star Dominic Lee. The party finalised its target of winning seven seats, two geographical constituencies and five functional constituencies. Incumbents Felix Chung, Tommy Cheung and Frankie Yick sought for re-election in their sectors while vice-chairman Peter Shiu to take up retiring leader Vincent Fang's place in Wholesale and Retail constituency and Joseph Chan Ho-lim to run in Commercial (First) functional constituency against BPA's Jeffrey Lam.
- New People's Party (NPP): Regina Ip's party planned to field candidates with herself and Michael Tien seeking re-election in Hong Kong Island and New Territories West and young barrister Eunice Yung running in New Territories East with the help of its local ally, district-based Civil Force.

=== Pan-democracy camp ===
- Civic Party: The Civic Party became the largest pro-democracy party along with the Democratic Party from the last election. The party received 17 nominations for the intra-party primary in January. Four incumbents, Claudia Mo, Kwok Ka-ki, Alvin Yeung and Dennis Kwok would seek re-election while party leader Alan Leong and Kenneth Chan decided to step down. The party decided to field Jeremy Tam in Kowloon East where Leong would stand in Tam's list in the second place and Tanya Chan would contest Hong Kong Island. Tsuen Wan District Councillor Sumly Chan also won the party's nomination to run in District Council (Second). Ken Tsang, who failed to get the party's nomination for running in Social Welfare left the party and ran as an independent.
- Democratic Party: The Democratic Party decided to drastically reduce their candidate lists from ten tickets to only seven in the election by conducting intra-party pre-election primaries for the candidacies. A total number of 14 nominations were received with veterans Emily Lau, Albert Ho and Sin Chung-kai not standing for re-election. The three retirees later decided to run as second candidates in the tickets led by new faces Lam Cheuk-ting, Andrew Wan and Hui Chi-fung who won the primaries. The three other incumbents, James To, Helena Wong and Wu Chi-wai would also seek re-election, while young Yuen Long District Councillor Kwong Chun-yu led a ticket in District Council (Second) "super seat".
- Labour Party: All three of the directly elected Labour incumbents, Lee Cheuk-yan, Cyd Ho and Fernando Cheung sought re-election in New Territories West, Hong Kong Island and New Territories East respectively, while the Social Welfare legislator Cheung Kwok-che announced his retirement. The newly elected chairwoman Suzanne Wu and vice-chairman Chiu Shi-shun also stood in Kowloon East.
- People Power–League of Social Democrats (PP–LSD): Facing challenges from the emerging radical post-Occupy groups, the League of Social Democrats (LSD) and the People Power formed an electoral alliance in the name of "progressive democrats". The alliance fielded nine candidates aiming to win at least six seats, New Territories East incumbents Leung Kwok-hung and Raymond Chan sought re-election with two separate tickets, while League chairman Avery Ng and People Power former chairman Christopher Lau and chairwoman Erica Yuen ran in Kowloon West and Hong Kong Island respectively. People Power's Tam Tak-chi ran in Kowloon East, while League vice-chairman Raphael Wong formed a join ticket with People Power's Albert Chan in New Territories West.
- Hong Kong Association for Democracy and People's Livelihood (ADPL): Although being barred from running in the District Council (Second) constituency after he lost his District Council seat in the 2015 District Council election, incumbent legislator Frederick Fung changed to run in the New Territories West geographical constituency. 2012 Kowloon West candidate and vice-chairman Tam Kwok-kiu narrowly defeated chairwoman Rosanda Mok in a primary to stand in the same constituency, while Sham Shui Po District Councillor Ho Kai-ming took up Fung's place in District Council (Second).
- Neighbourhood and Worker's Service Centre (NWSC): The veteran NWSC legislator Leung Yiu-chung left his longtime base of New Territories West to contest in District Council (Second) constituency, while his place in New Territories West was succeeded by his long-time protege Wong Yun-tat.
- Neo Democrats: Once vowed not to participate in the District Council (Second) constituency created under the Democratic Party's modified reform proposals in 2010 which the Neo Democrats broke away from the party to oppose, the Neo Democrats fielded Kwan Wing-yip in District Council (Second), besides its current seat held by Gary Fan in New Territories East.

=== Localist groups ===
- ALLinHK and Hong Kong Indigenous: An electoral alliance formed by six post-Occupy groups emerged from the 2014 protests, consisting of Youngspiration, Kowloon East Community, Tin Shui Wai New Force, Cheung Sha Wan Community Establishment Power, Tsz Wan Shan Constructive Power and Tuen Mun Community, field candidates in four of the five constituencies while supporting Hong Kong Indigenous' Edward Leung who received a better-than-expected result in the February by-election to run again. Youngspiration's convenor Baggio Leung who initially intended to run in Hong Kong Island and stood in New Territories West finally submitted his nomination to stand in New Territories East in the wake of the EAC's measure, which he claimed to be a "substitute candidate" in case Edward Leung was disqualified in the constituency. Although nominations of all candidates from the alliance's were accepted, Edward Leung's nomination was invalidated on 2 August.
- Civic Passion–Proletariat Political Institute–Hong Kong Resurgence Order (CP–PPI–HKRO): Wong Yeung-tat's Civic Passion, Wong Yuk-man's Proletariat Political Institute and Chin Wan's Hong Kong Resurgence Order announced their plan in running in all five geographical constituencies in February 2016. The alliance fielded Wong Yuk-man and Wong Yeung-tat for the two Kowloon constituencies, Chin Wan for New Territories East, Cheng Chung-tai for New Territories West and Alvin Cheng for Hong Kong Island. Despite their localist stance, all five tickets were validated under the EAC's new election measure.
- Demosistō: The new party emerged from the 2014 Umbrella Revolution led by the movement leaders planned to field two tickets in Hong Kong Island led by chairman Nathan Law and Kowloon East by vice-chairman Oscar Lai, but Lai later dropped out due to lack of funding. Its allies in the election were Democracy Groundwork's Lau Siu-lai in Kowloon West and Land Justice League's Eddie Chu in the New Territories West who ran as a nonpartisan.
- Hong Kong National Party (HKNP): Convenor Chan Ho-tin of the first party who officially advocated for Hong Kong independence planned to run in New Territories West but was disqualified, as the EAC claimed that Chan's platform violated the Basic Law.

=== Moderate groups ===
- Path of Democracy: The new moderate group led by former Civic Party legislator Ronny Tong fielded two candidates, governors Gary Wong Chi-him and Raymond Mak Ka-chun in Hong Kong Island and New Territories East.
- Third Side: The new moderate party led by former Democratic Party vice-chairman Tik Chi-yuen planned to field candidates in Kowloon West and two New Territories constituencies, but later dropped out of the New Territories East contest and triggered the departure of ten party member including two vice-chairmen Marcus Liu Tin-shing and Ben Kuen Ping-yiu. Liu and Kuen later led an independent ticket in New Territories East; another party member Wong Sing-chi decided to run in Social Welfare as an independent.

== Retiring incumbents ==
| Constituency | Departing incumbents | Party |
|---|---|---|
| Hong Kong Island | Kenneth Chan | Civic |
| Hong Kong Island | Jasper Tsang | DAB |
| Kowloon East | Chan Kam-lam | DAB |
| New Territories West | Tam Yiu-chung | DAB |
| Heung Yee Kuk | Lau Wong-fat | BPA |
| Medical | Leung Ka-lau | Nonpartisan |
| Social Welfare | Cheung Kwok-che | Labour/SWGU |
| Industrial (Second) | Lam Tai-fai | Nonpartisan |
| Finance | Ng Leung-sing | Nonpartisan |
| Wholesale and Retail | Vincent Fang | Liberal |
| District Council (First) | Ip Kwok-him | DAB |
| District Council (Second) | Chan Yuen-han | FTU |

== Campaign ==
=== Election strategies ===
Many political parties and groups and individuals formed strategic alliances in the campaign. Alvin Yeung of the Civic Party who led in the opinion polls in the New Territories East cooperated with Labour Party's Fernando Cheung who traced behind in the polls. Leung Yiu-chung of the Neighbourhood and Worker's Service Centre (NWSC) who ran in the territory-wide District Council (Second) "super seat" also had joint-promotional leaflets with Lau Siu-lai of Democracy Groundwork in Kowloon West. Liberal Party honorary chairman James Tien who was running in the New Territories East and "middle-of-the-road" politician Ricky Wong Wai-kay who aimed at the last seat in Hong Kong Island also went out of their constituencies and campaigned for each other. James Tien also campaigned for the "middle-of-the-road" party Third Side's Tik Chi-yuen who aimed at the last seat in Kowloon West against Yau Wai-ching of the localist group Youngspiration. On 15 August, it was reported that volunteers and staff from Kowloon West New Dynamic chaired by pro-Beijing politician Priscilla Leung helped Tik arrange a meet-the-public event in Sham Shui Po.

In the District Council (Second) constituency, the Democratic Party also asked the supporters of veteran James To who led in the polls to vote for another Democrat candidate Kwong Chun-yu who was fighting for the last seat against Democratic Alliance for the Betterment and Progress of Hong Kong (DAB) candidate Holden Chow. The Democratic Party invited former Chief Secretary Anson Chan to back Kwong, who also endorsed Civic Party's Sumly Chan who ran in the same constituency.

In late August, the pro-Beijing parties also began to campaign for each other. DAB District Council (Second) candidate Holden Chow campaigned for New People's Party (NPP) New Territories East candidate Eunice Yung who was behind in the opinion polls, in exchange for the 24 NPP New Territories district councillors to campaign for Chow. Hong Kong Federation of Trade Unions (FTU) District Council (Second) candidate Wong Kwok-hing also campaigned with Business and Professionals Alliance for Hong Kong (BPA) Kowloon West candidate Priscilla Leung, the only constituency where the FTU did not field their candidate.

=== Issues and election forums ===
Issues including Hong Kong independence, filibustering, universal retirement protection scheme, standard working hours and Chief Executive Leung Chun-ying's administration and re-election took central stage at the election forums. Pro-Beijing candidates questioned pan-democrat parties' stance on Hong Kong independence, while localist Kowloon East Community's Chan Chak-to declared his support for independence at the TVB Kowloon East electoral forum despite six pro-independence candidates had been disqualified. Localist candidates exchanged criticisms with the pan-democrats as the pan-democrat candidates dismissed localists' pro-independence call as empty talk.

The pro-Beijing candidates also accused the pan-democrats of their filibustering and obstructionism in the Legislative Council, while pan-democrat candidates attacked the pro-Beijing candidates did not push for a more progressive universal retirement protection scheme and standard working hours policies. The pan-democrats also criticised the pro-Beijing camp being allies of the Leung Chun-ying government and opposed to use Powers and Privileges Ordinance to investigate into Leung's receipt of HK$50 million from UGL Limited and resignations of ICAC heads.

=== Ken Chow's dropout ===
On 25 August, Liberal Party's Ken Chow Wing-kan who ran for New Territories West announced he would stop his electioneering at the Cable TV election forum for fear of "people close to him paying a heavy price". He earlier revealed that he was approached by a middleman to quit the race for a hefty sum of money. Chow passed a voice clip to the media before the election forum, in which a man claimed he would bring 20 to 30 Ho supporters to "pursue" Chow before and after the forum so that he would "lose mood" for the debate. The man in the clip also said the supporters should wear another candidate Lawyer Junius Ho’s vests during the forum. Ho denied having any plans to intimidate Chow and claimed he had rejected one of his supporters' proposal to "pursue" Chow.

=== Pan-democrat candidates' dropouts ===
On 2 September less than 48 hours before the election day and after the release of the large-scale opinion poll conducted by University of Hong Kong Public Opinion Programme (HKUPOP) and sponsored by pro-democracy group Power for Democracy, five pro-democrat candidates, independents Paul Zimmerman and Chui Chi-kin in Hong Kong Island, Labour Party's Suzanne Wu in Kowloon East and Civic Party's Sumly Chan and Association for Democracy and People's Livelihood's (ADPL) Kalvin Ho in District Council (Second), suspended their campaigns in the hope of deflecting support to fellow pan-democrats who were seen as standing a better chance. Clarice Cheung Wai-ching, a non-aligned independent also abandoned her campaign in New Territories West and called her supporters to vote for pan-democrat candidates. On 3 September, the third pro-democratic District Council (Second) candidate Kwan Wing-yip also aborted his campaign but marked it as "a dark day for democracy".

== Opinion polling ==
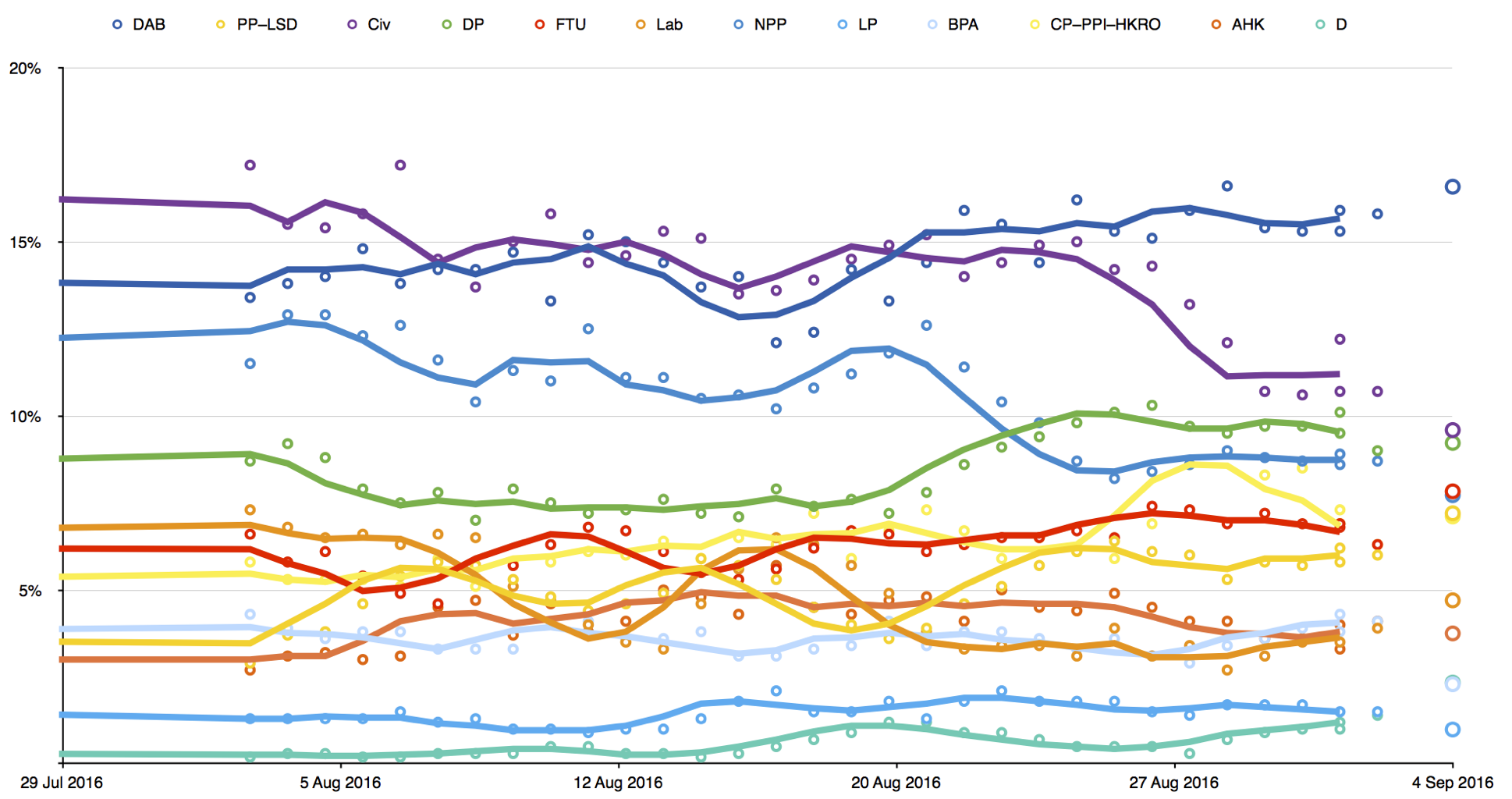
DAB PP–LSD Civic Democratic FTU Labour NPP Liberal BPA CP–PPI–HKRO ALLinHK Demosistō

The reliability of the rolling poll conducted by the University of Hong Kong Public Opinion Programme (HKUPOP) was widely questioned. The sample size of the poll, fewer than 300 respondents in each of the five geographical constituencies each day, was criticised as being too small. Additionally, pollsters only mentioned the first candidate on the list during interviews which could have made a difference in the results, as many veterans, including Democrats Sin Chung-kai, Albert Ho and Emily Lau, Liberal James Tien, Civic Party's Alan Leong, and People Power Albert Chan, stood in the second place behind the new faces on their party lists while their lists continued to trail behind in the polls. After the complaints, the HKUPOP decided to mention two candidates on the candidate list to respondents from 22 August night onwards.

== Results ==
Result by parties and camps

Before election:

↓
| 27 | 1 | 42 |
| Anti-establishment (pro-democrats & localists) | | Pro-establishment |

Change in composition:

↓
| 29 | 1 | 40 |
| Anti-establishment (pro-democrats & localists) | | Pro-establishment |

Summary of the 4 September 2016 Legislative Council of Hong Kong election results
| Political affiliation | Geographical Constituencies | | | | Traditional Functional Constituencies | | | | District Council (Second) FC | | | | Total seats | ± |
| Political affiliation | Votes | % | ±pp | Seats | Votes | % | ±pp | Seats | Votes | % | ±pp | Seats | Total seats | ± |
|---|---|---|---|---|---|---|---|---|---|---|---|---|---|---|
| DAB | 361,617 | 16.68 | ▼3.54 | 7 | 98 | 0.06 | ▼0.01 | 3 | 568,561 | 29.77 | ▼0.19 | 2 | 12 | ▼1 |
| BPA | 49,745 | 2.29 | N/A | 1 | 4,622 | 2.76 | N/A | 6 | - | - | - | - | 7 | 0 |
| FTU | 169,854 | 7.83 | ▲0.77 | 3 | - | - | - | 2 | 233,236 | 12.11 | ▼3.36 | 0 | 5 | ▼1 |
| Liberal | 21,500 | 0.99 | ▼1.70 | 0 | 6,381 | 3.82 | ▲3.06 | 4 | - | - | - | - | 4 | ▼1 |
| NPP | 167,589 | 7.73 | ▲3.97 | 3 | - | - | - | - | - | - | - | - | 3 | ▲1 |
| FLU | - | - | - | - | - | - | - | 1 | - | - | - | - | 1 | 0 |
| New Forum | - | - | - | - | 1,389 | 0.83 | - | 1 | - | - | - | - | 1 | 0 |
| Pro-Beijing others | 100,711 | 4.64 | N/A | 2 | 40,255 | 24.07 | N/A | 5 | - | - | - | - | 7 | ▼1 |
| Total for pro-Beijing camp | 871,016 | 40.17 | ▼2.49 | 16 | 52,745 | 31.54 | ▼4.62 | 22 | 801,797 | 41.98 | ▼3.45 | 2 | 40 | ▼3 |
| Democratic | 199,876 | 9.22 | ▼4.43 | 5 | 1,231 | 0.74 | ▼0.29 | 0 | 735,597 | 38.51 | ▲4.25 | 2 | 7 | ▲1 |
| Civic | 207,885 | 9.59 | ▼4.49 | 5 | 3,405 | 2.04 | ▼1.11 | 1 | 28,311 | 1.48 | N/A | 0 | 6 | 0 |
| PP–LSD | 156,019 | 7.20 | ▼7.39 | 2 | - | - | - | - | - | - | - | - | 2 | ▼1 |
| Professional Commons | - | - | - | - | 18,384 | 10.99 | N/A | 2 | - | - | - | - | 2 | 0 |
| Labour | 101,860 | 4.70 | ▼1.49 | 1 | - | - | - | - | - | - | - | - | 1 | ▼3 |
| NWSC | 20,974 | 0.97 | ▼1.45 | 0 | - | - | - | - | 303,457 | 15.89 | N/A | 1 | 1 | 0 |
| PTU | - | - | - | - | 45,984 | 27.49 | ▼5.28 | 1 | - | - | - | - | 1 | 0 |
| ADPL | 33,255 | 1.53 | ▼0.16 | 0 | - | - | - | - | 17,175 | 0.90 | ▼15.57 | 0 | 0 | ▼1 |
| Neo Democrats | 31,595 | 1.46 | ▼0.12 | 0 | - | - | - | - | 23,631 | 1.24 | N/A | 0 | 0 | ▼1 |
| Other democrats | 29,704 | 1.37 | N/A | 0 | 29,895 | 17.87 | N/A | 3 | - | - | - | - | 3 | ▲2 |
| Total for pan-democrats | 781,168 | 36.02 | ▼20.14 | 13 | 98,899 | 59.13 | ▼3.15 | 7 | 1,108,171 | 58.02 | ▲7.29 | 3 | 23 | ▼3 |
| ALLinHK | 81,422 | 3.75 | New | 2 | - | - | - | - | - | - | - | - | 2 | ▲2 |
| CP–PPI–HKRO | 154,176 | 7.11 | N/A | 1 | - | - | - | - | - | - | - | - | 1 | 0 |
| Demosistō | 50,818 | 2.34 | New | 1 | - | - | - | - | - | - | - | - | 1 | ▲1 |
| Democracy Groundwork | 38,183 | 1.76 | New | 1 | - | - | - | - | - | - | - | - | 1 | ▲1 |
| Other localists | 87,294 | 4.03 | N/A | 1 | - | - | - | - | - | - | - | - | 1 | ▲1 |
| Total for localists | 411,893 | 19.00 | - | 6 | - | - | - | - | - | - | - | - | 6 | ▲5 |
| Path of Democracy | 18,112 | 0.84 | New | 0 | - | - | - | - | - | - | - | - | 0 | 0 |
| Third Side | 13,461 | 0.62 | New | 0 | - | - | - | - | - | - | - | - | 0 | 0 |
| Non-aligned independents | 72,761 | 3.36 | N/A | 0 | 15,613 | 9.33 | N/A | 1 | - | - | - | - | 1 | ▲1 |
| Total for non-aligned others | 104,334 | 4.81 | ▲3.71 | 0 | 15,613 | 9.33 | ▲7.78 | 1 | - | - | - | - | 1 | ▲1 |
| Total | 2,168,411 | 100.00 | | 35 | 167,257 | 100.00 | | 30 | 1,909,968 | 100.00 | | 5 | 70 | - |
| Valid votes | 2,167,411 | 98.42 | ▼0.04 | | 167,257 | 96.78 | ▲2.81 | | 1,909,968 | 96.31 | ▲1.15 | | | |
| Invalid votes | 34,872 | 1.58 | ▲0.04 | | 5,563 | 3.22 | ▼2.81 | | 73,081 | 3.72 | ▼1.15 | | | |
| Votes cast / turnout | 2,202,283 | 58.28 | ▲4.97 | | 172,820 | 74.33 | ▲4.68 | | 1,983,049 | 57.09 | ▲5.14 | | | |
| Registered voters | 3,779,085 | 100.00 | ▲9.03 | | 232,498 | 100.00 | ▲7.15 | | 3,473,792 | 100.00 | ▲7.89 | | | |

=== Votes summary ===
Votes, of total, by camp
1. Pro-Beijing (40.2%)
2. Pan-democrats (36.0%)
3. Localists (19.0%)
4. Other (4.81%)
Seats, of total, by camp
1. Pro-Beijing (57.1%)
2. Pan-democrats (32.9%)
3. Localists (8.57%)
4. Other (1.43%)

Popular vote
| DAB | 16.58% |
| Civic | 9.59% |
| Democratic | 9.22% |
| FTU | 7.83% |
| NPP | 7.72% |
| PP–LSD | 7.20% |
| CP–PPI–HKRO | 7.11% |
| Labour | 4.70% |
| ALLinHK | 3.75% |
| Demosisto | 2.34% |
| BPA | 2.29% |
| DG | 1.76% |
| ADPL | 1.53% |
| Neo Democrats | 1.46% |
| Liberal | 0.99% |
| NWSC | 0.97% |
| PD | 0.84% |
| Third Side | 0.62% |
| Independent | 13.40% |

=== Seats summary ===
Seat
| DAB | 17.14% |
| Democratic | 10.00% |
| BPA | 10.00% |
| Civic | 8.57% |
| FTU | 7.14% |
| Liberal | 5.71% |
| NPP | 4.29% |
| PP–LSD | 2.86% |
| ALLinHK | 2.86% |
| PC | 2.86% |
| CP–PPI–HKRO | 1.43% |
| Labour | 1.43% |
| Demosisto | 1.43% |
| DG | 1.43% |
| NWSC | 1.43% |
| FLU | 1.43% |
| New Forum | 1.43% |
| PTU | 1.43% |
| Independent | 17.14% |

=== Results by district ===
| District | DAB | FTU | NPP | Pro-est. Total | Civ | DP | PP LSD | Lab | CP PPI RO | AHK | D+ allies | Anti-est. Total |
|---|---|---|---|---|---|---|---|---|---|---|---|---|
| Central & Western | 15.01 | 8.65 | 15.28 | 39.77 | 9.15 | 14.21 | 1.46 | 4.29 | 4.65 | - | 13.85 | 48.55 |
| Wan Chai | 11.17 | 8.09 | 21.33 | 41.47 | 10.02 | 10.78 | 1.49 | 4.65 | 4.46 | - | 12.99 | 45.35 |
| Eastern | 9.65 | 14.70 | 15.12 | 41.47 | 9.49 | 9.74 | 2.11 | 5.87 | 6.52 | - | 13.29 | 47.75 |
| Southern | 10.55 | 11.30 | 16.47 | 38.95 | 9.08 | 12.80 | 2.13 | 4.41 | 6.59 | - | 13.94 | 49.97 |
| Hong Kong Island | 10.93 | 12.20 | 16.13 | 39.95 | 9.40 | 11.29 | 1.93 | 5.15 | 5.99 | - | 13.49 | 48.10 |
| Yau Tsim Mong | 21.26 | - | - | 37.35 | 12.70 | 10.67 | 2.34 | - | 7.35 | 7.41 | 14.07 | 57.46 |
| Sham Shui Po | 17.66 | - | - | 35.34 | 10.80 | 7.67 | 2.61 | - | 7.49 | 7.00 | 13.50 | 60.22 |
| Kowloon City | 18.49 | - | - | 38.43 | 11.67 | 10.13 | 2.34 | - | 6.96 | 7.79 | 13.64 | 56.60 |
| Kowloon West | 18.84 | - | - | 37.01 | 11.59 | 9.34 | 2.44 | - | 7.25 | 7.40 | 13.69 | 58.16 |
| Wong Tai Sin | 12.34 | 16.85 | - | 42.66 | 13.34 | 17.50 | 9.85 | 0.82 | 10.60 | 3.61 | - | 57.34 |
| Kwun Tong | 17.98 | 12.65 | - | 47.03 | 14.12 | 13.75 | 9.55 | 0.73 | 9.78 | 4.12 | - | 52.97 |
| Kowloon East | 15.66 | 14.38 | - | 45.23 | 13.80 | 15.29 | 9.67 | 0.77 | 10.11 | 3.91 | - | 54.77 |
| Tsuen Wan | 20.03 | 5.80 | 14.30 | 45.04 | 10.63 | 5.79 | 5.06 | 4.72 | 7.66 | 1.29 | 13.07 | 54.71 |
| Tuen Mun | 13.32 | 8.68 | 12.95 | 42.45 | 6.29 | 7.92 | 4.72 | 5.22 | 10.60 | 1.47 | 14.97 | 57.31 |
| Yuen Long | 19.34 | 7.03 | 11.77 | 46.69 | 5.60 | 4.88 | 4.71 | 5.74 | 9.56 | 1.97 | 16.10 | 53.08 |
| Kwai Tsing | 19.08 | 9.90 | 9.40 | 42.68 | 6.65 | 9.06 | 4.49 | 4.48 | 8.04 | 1.74 | 10.99 | 56.50 |
| Islands | 21.37 | 11.08 | 9.58 | 47.21 | 8.34 | 5.61 | 5.00 | 3.75 | 8.32 | 1.39 | 15.28 | 52.50 |
| New Territories West | 18.04 | 8.23 | 11.71 | 44.37 | 7.02 | 6.91 | 4.73 | 5.00 | 9.03 | 1.65 | 13.94 | 55.24 |
| North | 23.79 | 5.34 | 3.17 | 39.61 | 7.89 | 8.59 | 13.33 | 7.32 | 4.11 | 8.26 | - | 55.73 |
| Tai Po | 21.66 | 4.09 | 4.09 | 34.63 | 9.05 | 5.99 | 14.52 | 8.53 | 4.44 | 6.81 | - | 60.19 |
| Sai Kung | 16.53 | 4.79 | 5.44 | 31.01 | 9.07 | 5.00 | 13.61 | 7.13 | 4.02 | 6.12 | - | 55.04 |
| Sha Tin | 16.20 | 4.49 | 8.98 | 34.77 | 9.48 | 7.49 | 14.44 | 10.06 | 3.92 | 5.98 | - | 59.68 |
| New Territories East | 18.53 | 4.64 | 6.23 | 34.60 | 9.03 | 6.77 | 14.05 | 8.58 | 4.07 | 6.55 | - | 57.92 |
| Total | 16.68 | 7.83 | 7.73 | 40.17 | 9.59 | 9.22 | 7.20 | 4.70 | 7.11 | 3.75 | 7.17 | 55.02 |

=== Incumbents defeated ===
Fifteen incumbents lost re-election.

| Party | Name | Constituency | Remarks |
|---|---|---|---|
| ADPL (1) | Frederick Fung | District Council (Second) | Ran in New Territories West. |
| Civic (1) | Alan Leong | Kowloon East | Stood as second candidate. |
| DAB (1) | Christopher Chung | Hong Kong Island | Stood as second candidate. |
| Democratic (3) | Albert Ho | District Council (Second) | Ran in New Territories West; stood as second candidate. |
| Democratic (3) | Emily Lau | New Territories East | Stood as second candidate. |
| Democratic (3) | Sin Chung-kai | Hong Kong Island | Stood as second candidate. |
| FTU (2) | Tang Ka-piu | Labour | Ran in New Territories East. |
| FTU (2) | Wong Kwok-hing | Hong Kong Island | Ran in District Council (Second). |
| Labour (2) | Cyd Ho | Hong Kong Island | |
| Labour (2) | Lee Cheuk-yan | New Territories West | |
| Liberal (1) | James Tien | New Territories East | Stood as second candidate. |
| Neo Democrats (1) | Gary Fan | New Territories East | |
| People Power (1) | Albert Chan | New Territories West | Stood as second candidate. |
| PPI (1) | Wong Yuk-man | Kowloon West | |
| Independent (1) | Tony Tse | Architectural, Surveying, Planning and Landscape | |

=== Outcome ===
Pro-democrats' results in 18 districts.

Pro-Beijing camp's results in 18 districts.

A unprecedented number of 2.2 million voters cast their votes, which composed of 58 per cent of the total electorate. Many voters queued outside the polling stations even after polling stations were due to close at 10:30 pm and a polling station in Taikoo Shing, the last vote was cast at almost 2:30am. the anti-establishment forces, including the pan-democrats and the localists, won 29 out of 70 seats; managed to retain the majority in the geographical constituencies to block the pro-Beijing camp's attempt to amend the rule of procedures to curb radicals' filibustering and the opposition's crucial one-thirds minority to maintain the veto power on government's constitutional reform proposal.

The localists, six backers of self-determination for Hong Kong, including Yau Wai-ching and Baggio Leung from the post-Occupy group Youngspiration, Occupy student leader Nathan Law of the Demosisto, who became the youngest ever candidate to be elected, Polytechnic University lecturer Lau Siu-lai, Eddie Chu, were returned in the geographical constituencies, securing of nearly 20 per cent of the vote share. Eddie Chu, a social activist and environmentalist, bagged more than 84,000 votes, the highest votes received in the geographical constituencies, without any party backing in New Territories West, leading the first runner-up, New People's Party's Michael Tien by about 13,000 votes. His allies, Nathan Law and Lau Siu-lai also became the pro-democrats which received the highest votes in Hong Kong Island and Kowloon West. The three took a total of 173,122 votes. For the ardently localist faction, Baggio Leung, leader of Youngspiration won in New Territories East after his ally, Hong Kong Indigenous' Edward Leung was barred from poll while Yau Wai-ching won last seat in Kowloon West by about 400 votes at the expense of veteran Wong Yuk-man of the Proletariat Political Institute. Wong's ally, Civic Passion leader Wong Yeung-tat also lost in his second bid in Kowloon East. Only Cheng Chung-tai from the electoral alliance won a seat in the New Territories West.

The pan-democrats saw their big names losing, including Labour Party's Lee Cheuk-yan and Cyd Ho and Association for Democracy and People's Livelihood's (ADPL) Frederick Fung. As a result, ADPL and Neo Democrats were ousted from the legislature while Labour retained only one seat. Benny Tai's ThunderGo plan was blamed as he released on the election day a list of recommended pro-democratic candidates based on pre-polling. It drew the voters to vote for the candidates who were on the brink of losing as shown in the polls from other candidates, which resulted in highest votes received by Eddie Chu, Lau Siu-lai and Nathan Law at other veteran democrats' expenses. Kwong Chun-yu, a Democratic Party young candidate in the District Council (Second) "super seat" who was also tracing behind in the polls received the highest votes of nearly 500,000 votes as a result, while the former "King of Votes", veteran Democrat James To who had led in the polls for weeks faced a tough battle with pro-Beijing Hong Kong Federation of Trade Unions's (FTU) Wong Kwok-hing for the last of the five "super seats". To secure the third seat for the pan-democrats with a thin margin of 10,694 votes. By putting themselves on the second place in their candidate lists, the veteran Democrats also managed to help their young colleagues to be elected, which made the Democratic Party the largest pro-democratic party again, overtaking the Civic Party. The pro-democrats retained their six out of nine seats in New Territories East, with both radical democrats, Leung Kwok-hung of the League of Social Democrats (LSD) and Chan Chi-chuen of the People Power retained their seats despite the overcrowding of the pro-democratic tickets. Leung, who took the last seat in the New Territories East by the margin of only 1,051 votes.

The pan-democrats also boost their functional constituency seats to 10. Besides retaining the pan-democrats' traditional strongholds including Legal and Education, as well as Kenneth Leung's Accountancy and Charles Mok's Information Technology, pan-democrat Edward Yiu made a surprise victory in Architectural, Surveying, Planning and Landscape, defeating incumbent pro-Beijing Tony Tse who became the only incumbent who lost in the functional constituencies. The pro-Beijing camp remained dominant in the functional constituencies. The pro-business Business and Professionals Alliance for Hong Kong (BPA) dominated in the functional constituencies by retaining six seats as well as Priscilla Leung's seat in Kowloon West. The Liberal Party came second by retaining the four functional constituency despite Joseph Chan's unsuccessful challenge against BPA's Jeffrey Lam in Commercial (First) and Dominic Lee's failed bid in New Territories East. The Democratic Alliance for the Betterment and Progress of Hong Kong (DAB) maintained its status as the largest party by winning 12 seats in total, one seat fewer than the previous election, while Regina Ip's New People's Party took one extra seat in New Territories East with a young barrister Eunice Yung who was supported by the Liaison Office. Another pro-Beijing candidate supported by the Liaison Office, independent lawyer Junius Ho, also won the last seat in New Territories West against Lee Cheuk-yan.

== Candidate lists and results ==
The nominations received and validated by the Electoral Affairs Commission listed as following:

=== Geographical Constituencies (35 seats) ===
Voting system: Party-list proportional representation with largest remainder method and Hare quota.

Results of the Geographical Constituencies
Hong Kong Island

| List № | Align. | Party/Allegiance | Candidate(s) won | Not elected | Votes | Votes % | Seat(s) won |
|---|---|---|---|---|---|---|---|
| 1 | N | PoD | | Gary Wong Chi-him | 10,028 | 2.66 | |
| 2 | D | People Power | | Christopher Lau Gar-hung, Erica Yuen Mi-ming | 7,276 | 1.93 | |
| 3 | B | NPP | Regina Ip Lau Suk-yee | Judy Chan Ka-pui, Joey Lee Man-lung, Tse Tsz-kei, Hung Lung-chuen, Gigi Wong Ching-chi | 60,760 | 16.13 | 1 |
| 4 | D | Labour | | Cyd Ho Sau-lan, Mak Tak-ching, Cheng Sze-lut | 19,376 | 5.15 | |
| 5 | B | DAB | Cheung Kwok-kwan | Christopher Chung Shu-kun, Jacqueline Chung Ka-man, Ada Mak Tse How-ling, Eddie Ting Kong-ho, Dominic Wong Chi-chung | 41,152 | 10.93 | 1 |
| 6 | B | Nonpartisan | | Chim Pui-chung | 2,587 | 0.69 | |
| 7 | L | Civic Passion | | Cheng Kam-mun, Bonix Chung Yuen-wun | 22,555 | 5.99 | |
| 8 | L | Demosistō | Nathan Law Kwun-chung | | 50,818 | 13.49 | 1 |
| 9 | N | Nonpartisan | | Shum Chee-chiu | 1,654 | 0.44 | |
| 10 | N | Nonpartisan | | Ricky Wong Wai-kay | 33,323 | 8.85 | |
| 11 | D | Nonpartisan | | Chui Chi-kin | 670 | 0.18 | |
| 12 | D | Independent democrat | | Paulus Johannes Zimmerman | 2,550 | 0.68 | |
| 13 | D | Democratic | Hui Chi-fung | Sin Chung-kai | 42,499 | 11.29 | 1 |
| 14 | D | Civic | Tanya Chan | Cheng Tat-hung | 35,404 | 9.40 | 1 |
| 15 | B | FTU | Kwok Wai-keung | Ng Chau-pei, Stanley Ho Ngai-kam, Lui Hung-pan, Chan Wing-yan | 45,925 | 12.20 | 1 |
| TOTAL (Quota: 16.67%) | | | | | 376,577 | 100.00 | 6 |

Kowloon West

| List № | Align. | Party/Allegiance | Candidate(s) won | Not elected | Votes | Votes % | Seat(s) won |
|---|---|---|---|---|---|---|---|
| 1 | D | LSD | | Avery Ng Man-yuen | 6,811 | 2.44 | |
| 2 | L | HKLP | | Jonathan Ho Chi-kwong | 399 | 0.14 | |
| 3 | D | Civic | Claudia Mo Man-ching | Joshua Li Chun-hei | 32,323 | 11.59 | 1 |
| 4 | B | BPA/KWND | Leung Mei-fun | Leung Man-kwong, Cho Wui-hung, Kacee Ting Wong, Leung Yuen-ting, Chan Kwok-wai | 49,745 | 17.84 | 1 |
| 5 | D | ADPL | | Tam Kwok-kiu, Yeung Yuk, Wong Wing-kit | 15,383 | 5.52 | |
| 6 | D | Pioneer of Victoria Park | | Chu Siu-hung | 680 | 0.24 | |
| 7 | L | PPI | | Wong Yuk-man, Ma Yu-sang | 20,219 | 7.25 | |
| 8 | D | Democratic | Wong Pik-wan | Ramon Yuen Hoi-man, Joshua Fung Man-tao, Chau Man-fong | 26,037 | 9.34 | 1 |
| 9 | D | Independent | | Lam Yi-lai, Au Wing-ho | 634 | 0.23 | |
| 10 | B | DAB | Ann Chiang Lai-wan | Chris Ip Ngo-tung, Chan Wai-ming, Siu Tin-hung, Cheung Tak-wai | 52,541 | 18.84 | 1 |
| 11 | B | Politihk SS | | Kwan San-wai, Ko Chi-keung | 938 | 0.34 | |
| 12 | L | DG | Lau Siu-lai | | 38,183 | 13.69 | 1 |
| 13 | L | Youngspiration | Yau Wai-ching | | 20,643 | 7.40 | 1 |
| 14 | D | Nonpartisan | | Augustine Lee Wing-hon, Foo Wai-kok | 874 | 0.31 | |
| 15 | N | Third Side | | Tik Chi-yuen, Wong Chun-long, Pang Yi-ting, Chen Lihong | 13,461 | 4.83 | |
| TOTAL (Quota: 16.67%) | | | | | 278,871 | 100.00 | 6 |

Kowloon East

| List № | Align. | Party/Allegiance | Candidate(s) won | Not elected | Votes | Votes % | Seat(s) won |
|---|---|---|---|---|---|---|---|
| 1 | B | FTU | Wong Kwok-kin | Chow Luen-kiu, Kan Ming-tung, Kwok Wang-hing | 47,318 | 14.38 | 1 |
| 2 | D | Labour | | Wu Sui-shan, Chiu Shi-shun | 2,535 | 0.77 | |
| 3 | B | VLHK | | Patrick Ko Tat-pun | 2,444 | 0.74 | |
| 4 | D | Frontier | | Tam Heung-man | 2,603 | 0.79 | |
| 5 | B | Nonpartisan | Paul Tse Wai-chun | | 47,527 | 14.45 | 1 |
| 6 | B | DAB | Wilson Or Chong-shing | Joe Lai Wing-ho, Cheung Ki-tang | 51,516 | 15.66 | 1 |
| 7 | D | Nonpartisan | | Lui Wing-kei | 1,393 | 0.42 | |
| 8 | D | Democratic | Wu Chi-wai | Mok Kin-shing, Cheng Keng-ieong, Wu Chi-kin | 50,309 | 15.29 | 1 |
| 9 | D | Civic | Jeremy Jansen Tam Man-ho | Alan Leong Kah-kit | 45,408 | 13.80 | 1 |
| 10 | L | Civic Passion | | Wong Yeung-tat | 33,271 | 10.11 | |
| 11 | L | KEC | | Chan Chak-to | 12,854 | 3.91 | |
| 12 | D | People Power | | Tam Tak-chi | 31,815 | 9.67 | |
| TOTAL (Quota: 20.00%) | | | | | 328,993 | 100.00 | 5 |

New Territories West

| List № | Align. | Party/Allegiance | Candidate(s) won | Not elected | Votes | Votes % | Seat(s) won |
|---|---|---|---|---|---|---|---|
| 1 | D | NWSC | | Wong Yun-tat, Leung Ching-shan, Rayman Chow Wai-hung | 20,974 | 3.48 | |
| 2 | D | Democratic | Andrew Wan Siu-kin | Ho Chun-yan, Lee Wing-tat, Catherine Wong Lai-sheung, Lam Siu-fai | 41,704 | 6.91 | 1 |
| 3 | B | Politihk SS | | Ko Chi-fai, Innes Tang Tak-shing | 604 | 0.10 | |
| 4 | B | Liberal | | Chow Wing-kan | 1,469 | 0.24 | |
| 5 | L | Civic Passion | Cheng Chung-tai | Cheung Yiu-sum | 54,496 | 9.03 | 1 |
| 6 | B | Nonpartisan | | Kwong Koon-wan | 810 | 0.13 | |
| 7 | B | NPP | Michael Tien Puk-sun | Wilson Wong Wai-shun, So Ka-man, Tsui Hiu-kit, Kam Man-fung, Cheng Chit-pun, Sammi Fu Hiu-lam | 70,646 | 11.71 | 1 |
| 8 | B | Independent | Ho Kwan-yiu | | 35,657 | 5.91 | 1 |
| 9 | B | DAB/NTAS | Leung Che-cheung | Lui Kin, Ken Wong Hon-kuen, Yip Man-pan, Chiu Kwan-siu, Lai Ka-man | 50,190 | 8.32 | 1 |
| 10 | D | Civic | Kwok Ka-ki | Sin Ho-fai | 42,334 | 7.02 | 1 |
| 11 | D | LSD/PP | | Wong Ho-ming, Albert Chan Wai-yip | 28,529 | 4.73 | |
| 12 | D | Labour | | Lee Cheuk-yan, Chiu Yan-loy | 30,149 | 5.00 | |
| 13 | L | Youngspiration/TSWNF | | Wong Chun-kit, Wong Pak-yu | 9,928 | 1.65 | |
| 14 | B | FTU | Alice Mak Mei-kuen | Yiu Kwok-wai, Kot Siu-yuen, Fung Pui-yin, Lau Chin-pang | 49,680 | 8.23 | 1 |
| 15 | D | ADPL | | Frederick Fung Kin-kee | 17,872 | 2.96 | |
| 16 | B | DAB | Chan Han-pan | Kwok Fu-yung, Li Sai-lung, Leung Kar-ming, Chan Chun-chung, Lui Dik-ming, Pau Ming-hong | 58,673 | 9.72 | 1 |
| 17 | N | Nonpartisan | | Clarice Cheung Wai-ching | 2,390 | 0.40 | |
| 18 | L | Christians to the World | | Hendrick Lui Chi-hang | 812 | 0.13 | |
| 19 | D | Nonpartisan | | Tong Wing-chi | 2,408 | 0.40 | |
| 20 | L | Nonpartisan | Eddie Chu Hoi-dick | | 84,121 | 13.94 | 1 |
| TOTAL (Quota: 11.11%) | | | | | 603,446 | 100.00 | 9 |

New Territories East

| List № | Align. | Party/Allegiance | Candidate(s) won | Not elected | Votes | Votes % | Seat(s) won |
|---|---|---|---|---|---|---|---|
| 1 | N | Independent | | Christine Fong Kwok-shan | 34,544 | 5.95 | |
| 2 | D | Democratic | Lam Cheuk-ting | Emily Lau Wai-hing, Ting Tsz-yuen, Ng Kam-hung, Lo Ying-cheung | 39,327 | 6.77 | 1 |
| 3 | N | Nonpartisan | | Liu Tin-shing, Kuen Ping-yiu, Li Wai | 850 | 0.15 | |
| 4 | L | HKRO/CP | | Chin Wan-kan, Marco Lee Kwok-hei | 23,635 | 4.07 | |
| 5 | D | LSD | Leung Kwok-hung | | 35,595 | 6.13 | 1 |
| 6 | D | Labour | Cheung Chiu-hung | Kwok Wing-kin | 49,800 | 8.58 | 1 |
| 7 | D | Civic | Alvin Yeung Ngok-kiu | | 52,416 | 9.03 | 1 |
| 8 | N | PoD | | Raymond Mak Ka-chun | 8,084 | 1.39 | |
| 9 | D | Independent | | Andrew Cheng Kar-foo | 17,892 | 3.08 | |
| 10 | B | DAB | Elizabeth Quat | Chong Yuen-tung, Tung Kin-lei, Chan Pok-chi, Alvin Chiu Man-leong, Philip Li Ka-leung, Wan Kai-ming, Ada Lo Tai-suen, Alf Wong Chi-yung | 58,825 | 10.13 | 1 |
| 11 | B | Nonpartisan | | Hau Chi-keung, Wong Shui-sang, Pang Wang-kin, Yip Wah-ching | 6,720 | 1.16 | |
| 12 | B | Liberal | | Dominic Lee Tsz-king, James Tien Pei-chun | 20,031 | 3.45 | |
| 13 | B | FTU | | Tang Ka-piu, Tam Kam-lin, Kent Tsang King-chung | 26,931 | 4.64 | |
| 14 | D | Neo Democrats | | Gary Fan Kwok-wai, Yam Kai-bong, Leung Li, Chung Kam-lun, Chan Wai-tat, Li Sai-hung, Chow Yuen-wai, Lui Man-kwong | 31,595 | 5.44 | |
| 15 | B | Nonpartisan | | Estella Chan Yuk-ngor | 486 | 0.08 | |
| 16 | L | Independent | | Wong Sum-yu | 1,657 | 0.29 | |
| 17 | B | Justice Alliance | | Leticia Lee See-yin | 2,938 | 0.51 | |
| 18 | D | People Power | Raymond Chan Chi-chuen | | 45,993 | 7.92 | 1 |
| 19 | L | Youngspiration /Nonpartisan | Sixtus Leung Chung-hang | Li Tung-sing | 37,997 | 6.55 | 1 |
| 20 | L | Independent | | Clarence Ronald Leung Kam-shing, Yau Man-king | 305 | 0.05 | |
| 21 | B | NPP/CF | Yung Hoi-yan | Stanley Lanny Tam, Victor Leung Ka-fai, Chan Man-kuen, Tong Hok-leung, James Yip Chi-ho, Michael Liu Tsz-chung | 36,183 | 6.23 | 1 |
| 22 | B | DAB/NTAS | Chan Hak-kan | Clement Woo Kin-man, Yiu Ming, Wong Pik-kiu, Larm Wai-leung, Tsang Hing-lung, Mui Siu-fung, Hau Hon-shek | 48,720 | 8.39 | 1 |
| TOTAL (Quota: 11.11%) | | | | | 580,524 | 100.00 | 9 |

=== District Council (Second) Functional Constituency (5 seats) ===
Voting system: Party-list proportional representation with largest remainder method and Hare quota.

District Council (Second) Functional Constituency

| List № | Align. | Party/Allegiance | Candidate(s) won | Not elected | Votes | Votes % | Seat(s) won |
|---|---|---|---|---|---|---|---|
| 801 | D | Democratic | James To Kun-sun | | 243,930 | 12.77 | 1 |
| 802 | B | DAB | Starry Lee Wai-king | Hung Lin-cham, Chu Lap-wai, Ngan Man-yu, Siu Ka-yi | 304,222 | 15.93 | 1 |
| 803 | D | Democratic | Kwong Chun-yu | | 491,667 | 25.74 | 1 |
| 804 | D | ADPL | | Kalvin Ho Kai-ming | 17,175 | 0.90 | |
| 805 | D | Civic | | Sumly Chan Yuen-sum | 28,311 | 1.48 | |
| 806 | B | FTU | | Wong Kwok-hing, Mok Kin-wing, Wong Wang-to, Lau Kwai-yung | 233,236 | 12.21 | |
| 807 | D | Neo Democrats | | Kwan Wing-yip, Hui Yui-yu, Lai Ming-chak | 23,631 | 1.24 | |
| 808 | D | NWSC | Leung Yiu-chung | | 303,457 | 15.89 | 1 |
| 809 | B | DAB | Holden Chow Ho-ding | Li Sai-wing, Nixie Lam Lam, Mo Shing-fung | 264,339 | 13.84 | 1 |
| TOTAL (Quota: 20.00%) | | | | | 1,909,968 | 100.00 | 5 |

=== Other Functional Constituencies (30 seats) ===
Voting systems: Different voting systems apply to different functional constituencies, namely for the Heung Yee Kuk, Agriculture and Fisheries, Insurance and Transport, the preferential elimination system of voting was used; and for the remaining 24 FCs the first-past-the-post voting system.

Results of the Functional Constituencies (excluding District Council (Second) constituency)
| Constituency | Incumbent | Result | Candidate(s) | Votes | Votes % |
|---|---|---|---|---|---|
| Heung Yee Kuk | Lau Wong-fat (BPA) | Incumbent retired BPA hold | Kenneth Lau Ip-keung (BPA) | uncontested | |
| Agriculture and Fisheries | Steven Ho Chun-yin (DAB) | Incumbent hold | Steven Ho Chun-yin (DAB) | 98 | 73.68 |
| Agriculture and Fisheries | Steven Ho Chun-yin (DAB) | Incumbent hold | Wong Yung-kan (Nonpartisan) | 35 | 26.32 |
| Insurance | Chan Kin-por (Independent) | Incumbent hold | Chan Kin-por (Independent) | uncontested | |
| Transport | Frankie Yick Chi-ming (Liberal) | Incumbent hold | Frankie Yick Chi-ming (Liberal) | 127 | 75.15 |
| Transport | Frankie Yick Chi-ming (Liberal) | Incumbent hold | Yau Ying-wah (Nonpartisan) | 42 | 24.84 |
| Education | Ip Kin-yuen (PTU) | Incumbent hold | Ip Kin-yuen (PTU) | 45,984 | 71.69 |
| Education | Ip Kin-yuen (PTU) | Incumbent hold | Choi Yuk-lin (Nonpartisan) | 18,158 | 28.31 |
| Legal | Dennis Kwok Wing-hang (Civic) | Incumbent hold | Dennis Kwok Wing-hang (Civic) | 3,405 | 69.48 |
| Legal | Dennis Kwok Wing-hang (Civic) | Incumbent hold | Catherine Mun Lee-ming (Nonpartisan) | 1,496 | 30.52 |
| Accountancy | Kenneth Leung Kai-cheong (PC) | Incumbent hold | Kenneth Leung Kai-cheong (PC) | 12,131 | 63.96 |
| Accountancy | Kenneth Leung Kai-cheong (PC) | Incumbent hold | Kenneth Chen Yung-ngai (Independent) | 6,836 | 36.04 |
| Medical | Leung Ka-lau (Nonpartisan) | Incumbent retired Nonpartisan gain | Pierre Chan (Nonpartisan) | 5,626 | 71.44 |
| Medical | Leung Ka-lau (Nonpartisan) | Incumbent retired Nonpartisan gain | Wong Yee-him (Nonpartisan) | 2,249 | 28.56 |
| Health Services | Joseph Lee Kok-long (Nonpartisan) | Incumbent hold | Joseph Lee Kok-long (Nonpartisan) | 15,221 | 61.75 |
| Health Services | Joseph Lee Kok-long (Nonpartisan) | Incumbent hold | Philip Choi Pui-wah (Nonpartisan) | 9,430 | 38.25 |
| Engineering | Lo Wai-kwok (BPA) | Incumbent hold | Lo Wai-kwok (BPA) | 3,906 | 55.47 |
| Engineering | Lo Wai-kwok (BPA) | Incumbent hold | Louis Ching Ming-tat (Independent) | 2,097 | 29.78 |
| Engineering | Lo Wai-kwok (BPA) | Incumbent hold | John Luk Wang-kwong (Nonpartisan) | 1,039 | 14.75 |
| Architectural, Surveying, Planning and Landscape | Tony Tse Wai-chuen (Independent) | Incumbent lost re-election Nonpartisan gain | Yiu Chung-yim (Nonpartisan) | 2,491 | 43.44 |
| Architectural, Surveying, Planning and Landscape | Tony Tse Wai-chuen (Independent) | Incumbent lost re-election Nonpartisan gain | Tony Tse Wai-chuen (Independent) | 2,009 | 35.03 |
| Architectural, Surveying, Planning and Landscape | Tony Tse Wai-chuen (Independent) | Incumbent lost re-election Nonpartisan gain | Bernard Vincent Lim Wan-fung (Nonpartisan) | 1,235 | 21.53 |
| Labour (3 seats) | Poon Siu-ping (FLU) | Incumbent hold | Poon Siu-ping (FLU) | uncontested | |
| Labour (3 seats) | Kwok Wai-keung (FTU) | Incumbent running for HKI GC; FTU hold | Ho Kai-ming (FTU) | uncontested | |
| Labour (3 seats) | Tang Ka-piu (FTU) | Incumbent running for NTE GC; FTU hold | Luk Chung-hung (FTU) | uncontested | |
| Social Welfare | Cheung Kwok-che (SWGU/Labour) | Incumbent retired Independent gain | Shiu Ka-chun (Independent) | 4,603 | 40.79 |
| Social Welfare | Cheung Kwok-che (SWGU/Labour) | Incumbent retired Independent gain | Yip Kin-chung (Nonpartisan) | 3,858 | 34.19 |
| Social Welfare | Cheung Kwok-che (SWGU/Labour) | Incumbent retired Independent gain | Kwan Yui-huen (Nonpartisan) | 1,255 | 11.12 |
| Social Welfare | Cheung Kwok-che (SWGU/Labour) | Incumbent retired Independent gain | Tsang Kin-chiu (Nonpartisan) | 1,011 | 8.96 |
| Social Welfare | Cheung Kwok-che (SWGU/Labour) | Incumbent retired Independent gain | Wong Sing-chi (Nonpartisan) | 557 | 4.94 |
| Real Estate and Construction | Abraham Shek Lai-him (BPA) | Incumbent hold | Abraham Shek Lai-him (BPA) | uncontested | |
| Tourism | Yiu Si-wing (Nonpartisan) | Incumbent hold | Yiu Si-wing (Nonpartisan) | 625 | 60.86 |
| Tourism | Yiu Si-wing (Nonpartisan) | Incumbent hold | Freddy Yip Hing-ning (Nonpartisan) | 288 | 28.04 |
| Tourism | Yiu Si-wing (Nonpartisan) | Incumbent hold | Lam Siu-lun (Nonpartisan) | 114 | 11.10 |
| Commercial (First) | Jeffrey Lam Kin-fung (BPA) | Incumbent hold | Jeffrey Lam Kin-fung (BPA) | 455 | 53.97 |
| Commercial (First) | Jeffrey Lam Kin-fung (BPA) | Incumbent hold | Joseph Chan Ho-lim (Liberal) | 388 | 46.03 |
| Commercial (Second) | Martin Liao Cheung-kong (Nonpartisan) | Incumbent hold | Martin Liao Cheung-kong (Nonpartisan) | uncontested | |
| Industrial (First) | Andrew Leung Kwan-yuen (BPA) | Incumbent hold | Andrew Leung Kwan-yuen (BPA) | uncontested | |
| Industrial (Second) | Lam Tai-fai (Nonpartisan) | Incumbent retired Nonpartisan gain | Ng Wing-ka (Nonpartisan) | uncontested | |
| Finance | Ng Leung-sing (Nonpartisan) | Incumbent retired Nonpartisan gain | Chan Chun-ying (Nonpartisan) | uncontested | |
| Financial Services | Christopher Cheung Wah-fung (BPA) | Incumbent hold | Christopher Cheung Wah-fung (BPA) | 261 | 51.48 |
| Financial Services | Christopher Cheung Wah-fung (BPA) | Incumbent hold | Ricky Chim Kim-lun (Nonpartisan) | 150 | 29.59 |
| Financial Services | Christopher Cheung Wah-fung (BPA) | Incumbent hold | Tsui Luen-on (Nonpartisan) | 96 | 18.93 |
| Sports, Performing Arts, Culture and Publication | Ma Fung-kwok (New Forum) | Incumbent hold | Ma Fung-kwok (New Forum) | 1,389 | 63.19 |
| Sports, Performing Arts, Culture and Publication | Ma Fung-kwok (New Forum) | Incumbent hold | Chow Pok-yin (Nonpartisan) | 809 | 36.02 |
| Import and Export | Wong Ting-kwong (DAB) | Incumbent hold | Wong Ting-kwong (DAB) | uncontested | |
| Textiles and Garment | Chung Kwok-pan (Liberal) | Incumbent hold | Chung Kwok-pan (Liberal) | 1,138 | 75.92 |
| Textiles and Garment | Chung Kwok-pan (Liberal) | Incumbent hold | Kenny Yang Si-kit (Nonpartisan) | 361 | 24.08 |
| Wholesale and Retail | Vincent Fang Kang (Liberal) | Incumbent retired Liberal hold | Shiu Ka-fai (Liberal) | 2,290 | 65.04 |
| Wholesale and Retail | Vincent Fang Kang (Liberal) | Incumbent retired Liberal hold | Au Nok-hin (Democratic) | 1,231 | 34.96 |
| Information Technology | Charles Peter Mok (PC) | Incumbent hold | Charles Peter Mok (PC) | 6,253 | 64.61 |
| Information Technology | Charles Peter Mok (PC) | Incumbent hold | Eric Yeung Chuen-sing (Nonpartisan) | 3,425 | 35.39 |
| Catering | Tommy Cheung Yu-yan (Liberal) | Incumbent hold | Tommy Cheung Yu-yan (Liberal) | 2,438 | 79.03 |
| Catering | Tommy Cheung Yu-yan (Liberal) | Incumbent hold | Ng Wing-tak (Nonpartisan) | 647 | 20.97 |
| District Council (First) | Ip Kwok-him (DAB) | Incumbent retired DAB hold | Lau Kwok-fan (DAB) | uncontested | |

== Aftermath ==
New People's Party chairwoman Regina Ip's car was caught driving out from the Liaison Office few hours after the election. Ip initially told Ming Pao her car was at the Liaison Office because she was sending some books she wrote to her friends there. She later admitted she lied about it as she "was requested by the other party to keep the meeting confidential". She also denied that she went there to thank Beijing for its support in the election. She was criticised as the Liaison Office had been accused for meddling in local politics and elections.

Rosanda Mok of the Association for Democracy and People's Livelihood and Erica Yuen of the People Power resigned as chairwoman after the parties' election defeats. Gary Fan who lost Neo Democrats' only seat in the legislature also resigned from the party's executive committee. Three Neo Democrats' Sha Tin District Councillors, Yau Man-chun, Billy Chan Shiu-yeung and Sunny Chiu Chu-pong, who campaigned for another pro-democrat Andrew Cheng without the party's consent were expelled from the party after the election. Fan criticised Cheng, Fan's mentor, for splitting the votes and causing his defeat.

Benny Tai's tactical voting plan ThunderGo was also blamed for causing the losses of the veteran pan-democrats, including Labour Party's Lee Cheuk-yan, as well as Civic Passion's Wong Yeung-tat, in whom the plan advise to drop to make way for League of Social Democrats' Wong Ho-ming and People Power's Tam Tak-chi in New Territories West and Kowloon East respectively. The seats were eventually won by pro-Beijing independents Junius Ho and Paul Tse in those constituencies. Benny Tai said the root of the matter was the fragmenting of the opposition camp, leading to many candidate lists which led to the need for tactical voting.

After the election, nonpartisan Eddie Chu, who was widely known for taking on the Heung Yee Kuk over its land rights, complained of "imminent" death threats against him and his family. Chu's campaign drew public attention to the long-time allegations of collusion between the government, business, landlords and triads behind the Wang Chau housing project, which made the government to scale down the housing project from 17,000 flats to only 4,000 due to the pressure from the powerful rural leader Tsang Shu-wo who owned the brownfield land in Wang Chau. He was placed under round-the-clock protection by the police days after the election. The incident escalated into the a major political crisis in the following weeks as the government was questioned over the alleged collusion.

On 8 September, Chan Ho-tin of the Hong Kong National Party (HKNP) who was disqualified from standing in the election challenged the government through an election petition. Edward Leung of Hong Kong Indigenous also filed his legal petition over his disqualification on 7 October. On 13 February 2018, the High Court ruled against Chan Ho-tin on his petition.

== See also ==
- 6th Legislative Council of Hong Kong
- 2016 President of the Hong Kong Legislative Council election
- 2018 Hong Kong by-election
- Hong Kong legislative elections
- Hong Kong LegCo members' oath-taking controversy
- 2014 NPCSC Decision on Hong Kong, which affected this election
