= Tam Tak-chi =

Hong Kong broadcaster and politician

- 譚得志
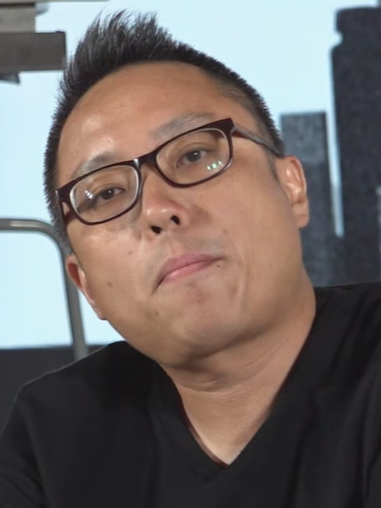

Vice Chairman of the People Power
- In office May 2016 – December 2021
- Preceded by: Yan Sun-kong

Personal details
- Born: 2 February 1973 (age 53) British Hong Kong
- Party: People Power
- Education: Chinese University of Hong Kong
- Occupation: Presenter; Radio commentator Politician

Tam Tak-chi (Chinese: 譚得志; Jyutping: taam4 dak1 zi3; born 2 February 1973), also called "Fast Beat" (Chinese: 快必) in his radio career, is a former Hong Kong radio presenter, actor and currently a social activist. He was the vice chairman of the pro-democracy political party People Power.

== Early career ==
Tam graduated from the University of Hong Kong with a bachelor's degree in Chinese Language. In the early 1990s, under the stage name "Fast Beat", he teamed up with Ray Chan (aka Slow Beat) hosting a radio show on Commercial Radio Hong Kong known as Fast Slow Beats with help from Winnie Yu. The duo gained popularity when they hosted Challengers of Fire on Asia Television in 1997, but left the show one year later. They remained partners after joining Metro Showbiz in 2000 until Tam quit his career as radio host in 2007 and worked at Asia Television until 2011.

== Political career ==
Tam has been active in the social activism since then. Tam joined the Citizens' Radio in 2009 and became an online radio show host. In 2011, he founded the Narrow Church to promote the social justice among Christian community. He also joined the Hong Kong People Reporter, an online radio platform founded by Stephen Shiu. He also joined the Power Voters, a group of activists who were disenfranchised by the Democratic Party compromise with the Beijing authorities over the constitutional reform package and ran against the Democratic Party in the 2011 District Council election.

Tam joined the People Power in 2013 after Wong Yuk-man quit the party. Tam Tak-chi took a leading supporting role in the Occupy Central with Love and Peace movement initiated by legal scholar Benny Tai. He stayed in the occupation zone in Mong Kok throughout the protests in 2014. In October, Tam refused Stephen Shiu's demand of ending the Mong Kok occupation which led to Tam's departure of Shiu's online radio platform Memehk in 2016.

On 29 May 2015, Tam was arrested for "incited others to commit illegal acts" by suggesting online that the hearse carrying the body of recently died Hong Kong Federation of Trade Unions (FTU) leader Yeung Kwong of the 1967 Hong Kong Leftist riots would be welcomed by "home-made pineapples" – a code that referred to bombs during the turmoil.

Tam ran in the elections in several levels on many occasions. In the 2015 District Council election, he ran against incumbent legislator Wong Kwok-hing of FTU in Siu Sai Wan but lost by a wide margin. In the 2016 Legislative Council election, Tam ran in Kowloon East but finished in seventh place in a five-member constituency.

In the 2019 District Council election, he ran against incumbent legislator Wilson Or of the Democratic Alliance for the Betterment and Progress of Hong Kong (DAB) in Kwong Tak but lost only by a narrow margin of 187 votes.

On 24 May 2020, Tam was arrested opposite Sogo Hong Kong in Causeway Bay for participating in illegal assembly to protest against the national security law. He ran in the 2020 pro-democracy primaries for the 2020 Legislative Council election in Kowloon East and received 10,980 votes, ranking the fourth place and thus secured the nomination to run in the general election.

On 17 July 2020, Tam was again arrested, this time on charges of incitement to participate in unlawful assembly in relation to a protest in January, seditious intention, and disorder in public places. While police did not provide the grounds for the latter two charges, Tam said that they were for swearing at the police and for shouting, "Liberate Hong Kong, revolution of our times". His subsequent trial was delayed due to a High Court ruling in another case, which determined that the foregoing slogan carried secessionist notions.

On 6 September 2020, Tam was arrested again, for "uttering seditious words". Senior Superintendent Li Kwai-wah said that in speeches made across Hong Kong in the preceding summer months, Tam had been "inciting hatred and contempt against the government". Li also said that the arrest had been carried out by national security police due to initial suspicion that Tam had violated the Hong Kong national security law, but that the sedition laws from the Crimes Ordinance under which Tam was arrested had been determined to be "more suitable" to the case.

On 21 October 2020, Tam asked the court to dismiss the sedition charges against him alleging that the colonial-era charges violate the Basic Law. Tam also said the indictment also breached international human rights covenants adopted by the United Nations.

On 6 January 2021, Tam was among 55 pan-democrats arrested for allegedly violating the national security law over their participation in the pro-democracy primaries of 2020. He was accused of "subverting state power", and was already in prison on sedition charges. On 28 February, he was charged, along with 46 others, with subversion. He sent the letter of quitting the People Power in jail on 6 December 2021 over intra-party rift.

On 2 March 2022, Tam was found guilty under 11 charges including "uttering seditious words", and acquitted of three charges. The date for the sentencing was set as 31 March. On 20 April, he was sentenced to 40 months in prison. An appeal against the sentence that Tam launched in July 2023 was rejected on 7 March 2024. On 6 March 2025, the Court of Final Appeal rejected Tam's appeal which he had launched in January. The ruling had a bearing on cases tried under the Safeguarding National Security Ordinance enacted 2024, which also covered sedition; several such cases had been put on hold to await the ruling.

Party political offices
Preceded by Yan Sun-kong	Vice Chairman of People Power; 2016–2021	Succeeded by Vacant
