= The Frontier (Hong Kong, 2010) =

The Frontier 前綫
- Convenor: Yan Sun-kong
- Founded: 9 September 2010; 16 years ago
- Preceded by: The Frontier (dissolved in 2008)
- Headquarters: 2/F, 163 Ma Yau Tong; Village, Sai Kung District, New; Territories, Hong Kong
- Ideology: Direct democracy Liberalism (Hong Kong); Radical democracy
- Political position: Centre-left to left-wing
- Regional affiliation: Pro-democracy camp
- Colours: Yellow
- Legislative Council: 0 / 90
- District Councils: 0 / 470

Website
- thefrontier.hk/tf/

The Frontier
- Traditional Chinese: 前綫
Transcriptions
Yue: Cantonese
- Yale Romanization: Chìhn sin
- Jyutping: Cin^{4} sin^{3}

The Frontier is a pro-democracy political group in the Hong Kong. It was established on 9 September 2010. The group is headed by convenor Yan Sun-kong since its establishment as a loose group of individual pro-democracy activists and was part of the People Power from 2011 to 2016. A party bearing the same name existed between 1996 and 2008.

On 23 November 2008, The Frontier declared that it would merge with the Democratic Party, also in the pro-democracy camp, but the motion to have it disbanded failed to meet the required support level of 80%. The party was reestablished on 9 September 2010 by former members who opposed joining the Democratic Party. Yang Sun-kong has been convenor since the reestablishment. From 2011 to 2016, the party was part of the People Power. The group held one seat in the Legislative Council of Hong Kong, Raymond Chan Chi-chuen who also represents for People Power.

The Frontier left the People Power in April 2016. It lost its only seat in the Legislative Council after legislator Raymond Chan left the party in May 2016.

== Performance in elections ==
=== Legislative Council elections ===
Election	Number of popular votes	% of popular votes	GC seats	FC seats	Total seats	+/−	Position
2012	People Power ticket		1	0	1 / 70	1▲	N/A

=== District Council elections ===
Election	Number of popular votes	% of popular votes	Total elected seats	+/−
2011	People Power ticket		0 / 412	0
2015	6,342	0.44	1 / 431	0
