= Erica Yuen =

Hong Kong politician and actress (born 1980)

Erica Yuen Mi Ming 袁彌明
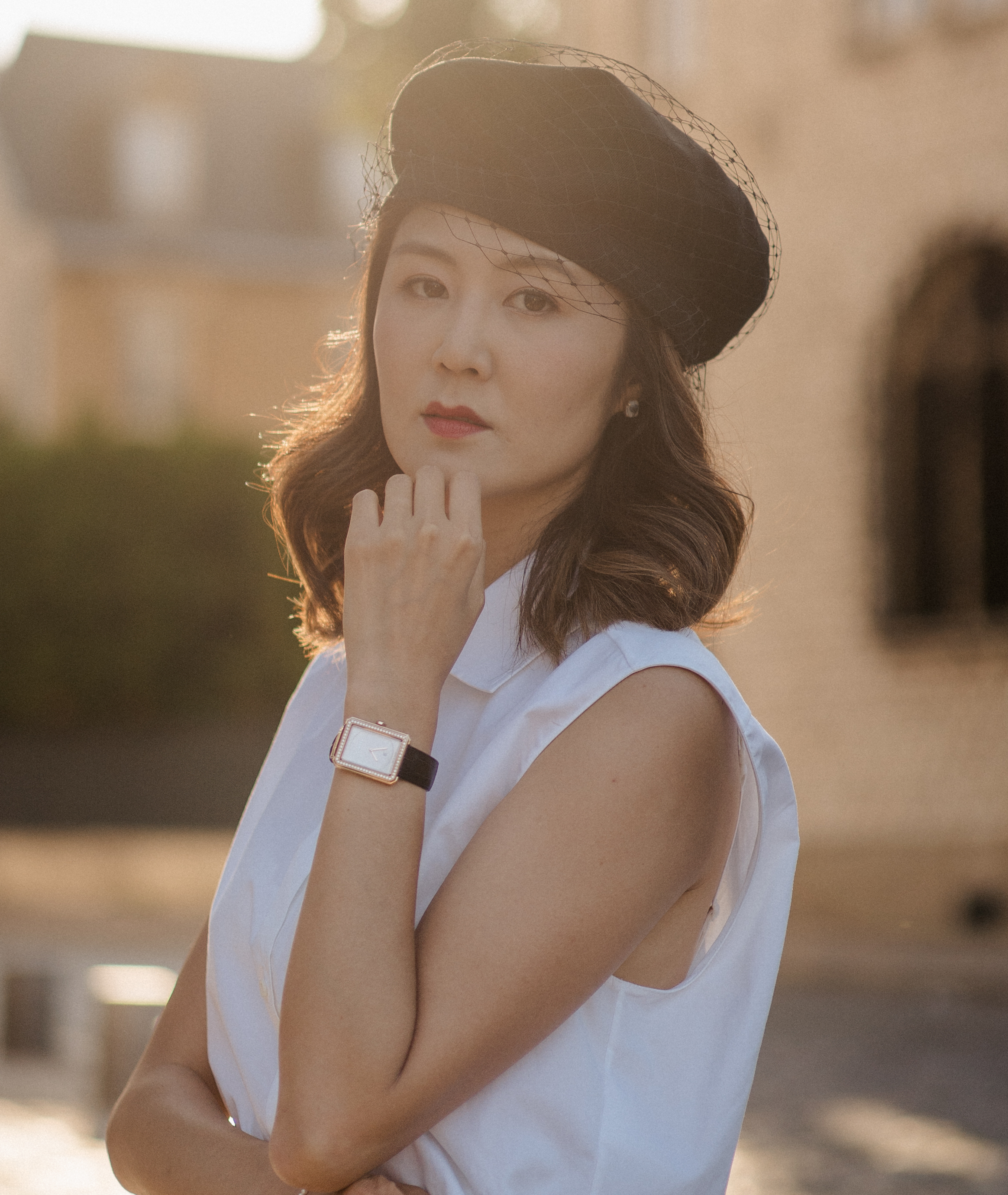
- Erica Yuen in 2022
- Born: Yuen Mi-ming; 28 September 1980 (age 45); British-Hong Kong
- Education: Tufts University
- Occupations: Actress, writer, presenter, politician
- Years active: 2005–present
- Political party: People Power
- Spouse: Anthony Lam
- Website: ericayuen.com

Erica Yuen Mi-ming (Chinese: 袁彌明, born 28 September 1980) is a Hong Kong politician, actress, and presenter. A former Miss Hong Kong pageant participant, she was the chairperson of the People Power political party between 2013 and 2016.

== Early life ==
Erica Yuen graduated from St. Stephen's College in 1997, continued her education at Northfield Mount Hermon School, later at Tufts University in Massachusetts, and graduated summa cum laude.

== Pageantry ==
In 2005, Yuen participated in the Miss Hong Kong pageant where she was awarded the title of Tourism Ambassador and was named one of the top five finalists on the final night.

== In politics ==
Yuen entered Hong Kong politics in 2011, when she co-founded Power Voters, which would later become a coalition member of People Power, with the aim of punishing the Democratic Party for its stance in the 2010 Hong Kong electoral reform. In 2012, Yuen announced that she would enter the Hong Kong Legislative Council election in September that year as a People Power candidate for New Territories East constituency with Raymond Chan Chi-chuen. In preparation for this, she renounced her US citizenship as required by Hong Kong election law. She was placed second in her party list under the Party-list proportional representation; Ray Chan, who was first on that list, was elected, but Yuen herself, like all other candidates ranked second or below in their party lists, was not.

Yuen was elected the chairwoman of People Power, succeeding Christopher Lau in July 2013. In March 2014, Yuen stood in a by-election for the South Horizons West seat on the Southern District Council, following the resignation of Fung Wai-kwong. She secured second place with 1,083 votes, behind Judy Chan Ka-pui of the New People's Party (2,023 votes) and ahead of Sin Chung-kai of the Democratic Party (920 votes). She failed again to challenge Chan in the general election in 2015. She stood as the second candidate in Christopher Lau's list in Hong Kong Island in the 2016 legislative election but the list was not elected. She resigned from the chairwomanship of People Power after the Legco election.

== Personal life ==
Yuen started a multi-brand skincare and health product store MI MING MART in 2009. The business went public in 2017 at Hong Kong Stock Exchange, stock code:8473. In December 2014, Yuen married political fellow-traveller and Power Voters chairman Anthony Lam Yue-yeung. Lam runs the media platform memehk.com until 2016, and – like Yuen – has stood unsuccessfully for Southern District Council.

Party political offices
Preceded by Christopher Lau	Chairman of People Power; 2013–2016	Succeeded by Ray Chan
