= Power Voters =

Power Voters 選民力量
- Chairman: Anthony Lam
- Founded: 20 September 2010
- Headquarters: M/F, Nos. 12–16 Lok; Ku Road, Sheung Wan, Hong Kong
- Ideology: Direct democracy Liberalism; Radical democracy
- Regional affiliation: People Power
- Colours: Magenta
- Legislative Council: 0 / 90
- District Councils: 0 / 470

Website
- https://powervoters.blogspot.hk

The Power Voters was a pro-democratic political group in Hong Kong. The core members formed the radical party People Power in early 2011 and became one of its branches.

Its major aims were to punish the largest pro-democratic party Democratic Party which did not participate in the resignation as referendum campaign launched by Civic Party and League of Social Democrats to press Beijing for universal suffrage in Hong Kong, and negotiated with the Central Government for the reformed constitutional reform package in mid-2010.

11 Power Voters members who were also affiliated themselves with People Power participated in the 2011 District Council elections, most of them chose to contest with the Democratic Party candidates. They failed to get any seat in the election.

== Leadership ==
- Chairman: Anthony Lam
- Spokesman: Jeff Au Yeung
- Deputy Spokesman: Raymond Chan Chi-chuen
- Treasury: Christopher Lau
- Public Relations: Erica Yuen
