= People Power (Hong Kong) =

Political party in Hong Kong

People Power 人民力量
- Founded: 3 April 2011
- Dissolved: November 2025
- Split from: League of Social; Democrats
- Ideology: Localism (HK); Direct democracy Radical democracy Populism
- Regional affiliation: Pro-democracy camp
- Colours: Yellow and black

Website
- peoplepower.hk

People Power
- Chinese: 人民力量
Transcriptions
Standard Mandarin
- Hanyu Pinyin: Rénmín lìliàng
Yue: Cantonese
- Yale Romanization: Yàhn màhn Lihk leuhng
- Jyutping: Jan^{4} man^{4} Lik^{6} loeng^{6}

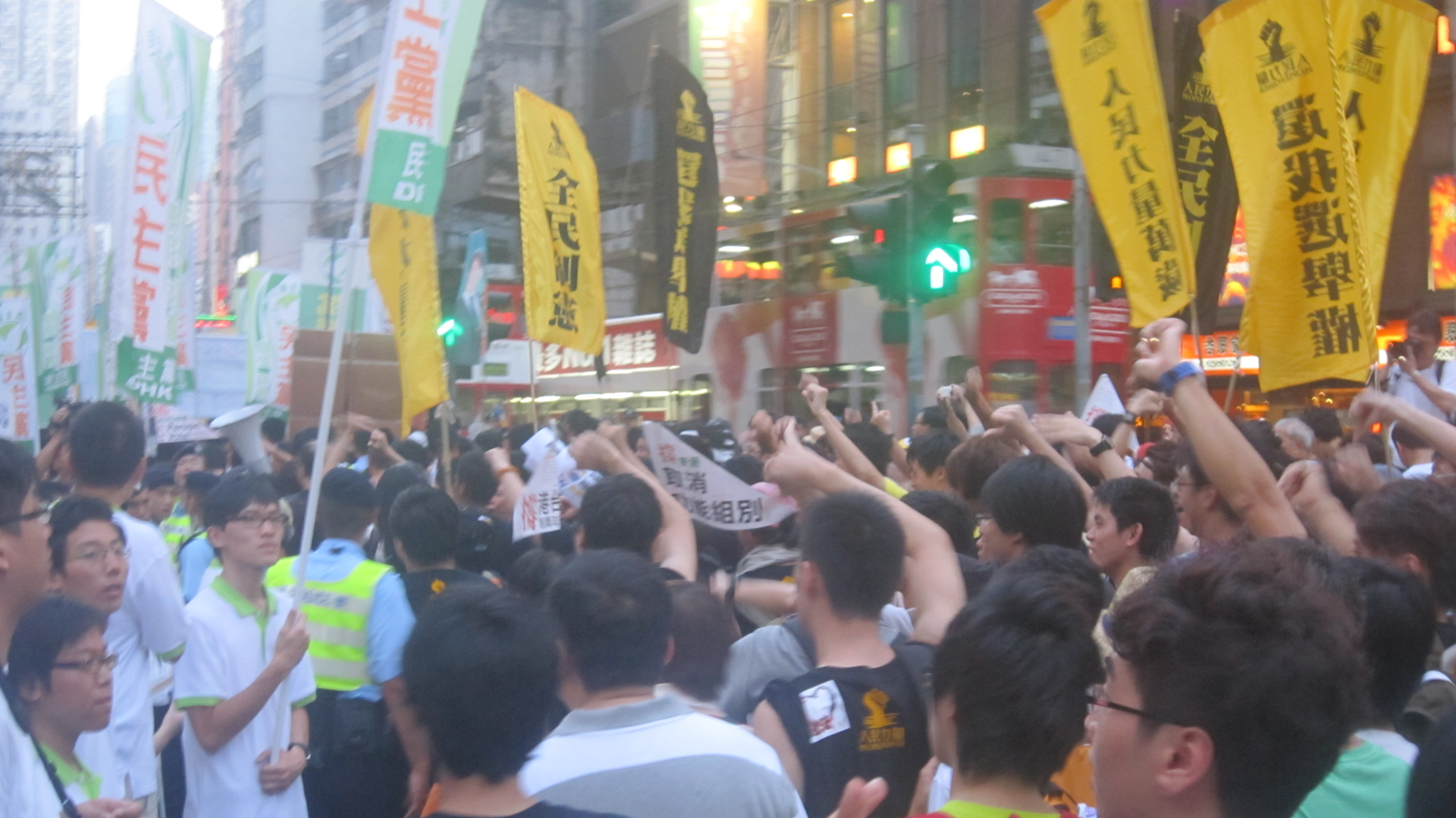
In 2011, members and supporters of People Power denounce the Democratic Party during the 1 July march

People Power (PP) was a populist and radical democratic political party in Hong Kong. Formerly chaired by Raymond Chan, it belonged to the radical wing of the pro-democracy camp.

People Power was founded in 2011 as a political coalition consisting of the defected League of Social Democrats (LSD) legislators Wong Yuk-man and Albert Chan and activists from the Power Voters, Democratic Alliance and The Frontier who aimed to "punish" the Democratic Party for its compromise with the Beijing authorities over the constitutional reform proposal in 2010. It filled 62 candidates in the 2011 District Council election, in which many of them stood against the Democrats, but only got one candidate elected. The party however ran a successful 2012 Legislative Council election by winning 10 per cent of the vote and gaining three seats in the Legislative Council.

After Wong Yuk-man's faction left the party in 2013, People Power developed a warmer relationship with the mainstream pan-democrats and cooperated with the LSD over parliamentary tactics such as filibustering. In the 2016 Legislative Council election, the party formed an electoral coalition with the LSD in which they received about seven percent of the votes, seeing Raymond Chan being re-elected. Chan resigned from the Legislative Council in September 2020 in protest to the government's decision to postpone the 2020 Legislative Council election, which left the party with no representation in the legislature. After Chan quit the party following his arrest, dozens left as well and the rump party is de-registered by the authorities in November 2025.

== History ==
=== Founding and 2011 elections ===
The People Power was established in early 2011 after two legislators Raymond Wong Yuk-man and Albert Chan Wai-yip quit the League of Social Democrats (LSD), citing disagreement with leader Andrew To and his faction. About two hundred of their supporters joined them, leaving the LSD in disarray. Besides the defected LSD members, the party was formed by political groups including the Wong Yuk-man's Proletariat Political Institute, Power Voters supported by Stephen Shiu Yeuk-yuen, the owner of the Hong Kong Reporter, the re-grouped Frontier and the two pro-ROC organisations China Youth Organization and Democratic Alliance.

Although considered part of the pan-democracy camp, the party was formed as the coalition to spite the pro-democratic Democratic Party who supported the 2010 constitutional reform package in the 2011 District Council elections,. The People Power claimed that the Democratic Party had already defected to the Chinese Communist Party and "sold out" the voters. The party filled in 62 candidates, many of them ran in the constituencies against both the Democratic Party and pro-Beijing candidates. Albert Chan gave up his seat in the Lai Hing constituency in Tsuen Wan District to back the Democratic Party chairman Albert Ho Chun-yan in Lok Tsui in Tuen Mun District. The People Power failed in winning any seat but a seat in Fung Cheung where its candidate Johnny Mak Ip-sing did not back the pan-democracy party. After winning just one seat of 62 contested, Albert Chan admitted that the strategy had failed. Nevertheless, he insisted that the party would 'stay the course'.

=== 2012 election ===
In May 2012, Albert Chan and Wong Yuk-man staged a weeks-long filibuster by submitting 1306 amendments altogether to the Legislative Council (Amendment) Bill 2012, by which the government attempted to forbid resigning lawmakers from participating in by-elections as the government's response to the "Five Constituency Referendum movement" launched by the LSD in 2010. On the morning of 17 May 2012, Jasper Tsang Yok-sing, President of the Legislative Council adopt Article 92 of the Standing Order, which allows the president follow foreign parliament rules for unregulated behaviours to terminate the debate. In the end, all amendments were defeated and the Bill was passed.

Shortly before 2012 LegCo elections, Johnny Mak, the party's sole District Councillor, and his group Democratic Alliance broke apart from the People Power, as Johnny Mak wanted to lead a candidate list in the New Territories West. The party gained more than ten percent of the vote in the geographical constituency and won three seats. Wong Yuk-man and Albert Chan were re-elected to the Legislative Council, with Ray Chan newly elected in the New Territories East as the first openly gay legislator in Hong Kong history. Chairman Christopher Lau Gar-hung failed to win a seat with Stephen Shiu in Hong Kong Island. Wong Yuk-man's protege Wong Yeung-tat also failed to win a seat where he contested against the LSD chairman Andrew To, who Wong Yuk-man split with a year ago. The People Power fiercely attacked the Democratic Party candidates during the campaign and called for blank vote in the District Council (Second) constituency created under the 2010 constitutional reform package and not voting for the Democratic Party and the Association for Democracy and People's Livelihood (ADPL). Wong Yeung-tat left and formed the Civic Passion.

In May 2013, the People Power once again staged a month-long filibuster by moving a total of 710 amendments on the Budget Appropriation Bill debate, to press for a universal pension scheme and a HK$10,000 cash handout to be included in John Tsang's budget. The government warned that the service would shut down if the budget bill do not pass. Jasper Tsang ordered to end the filibuster on 13 May after 55 hours spent to debate 17 of the 148 amendments. The Appropriation Bill was passed on 21 May 2013 with 684 amendments negatived.

=== Wong Yuk-man's departure and 2016 election ===
On 20 May 2013, Wong Yuk-man announced his resignation from People Power along with Proletariat Political Institute. It was believed to be related to his earlier split with Stephen Shiu Yeuk-yuen, the owner of the Hong Kong Reporter and People Power's financial supporters over the Occupy Central plan.

In March 2014, in a by-election for the South Horizons West seat on the Southern District Council, the group's chairman Erica Yuen secured second place with 1,083 votes, behind Judy Chan Ka-pui of the New People's Party (2,023 votes) and ahead of veteran Democrat Sin Chung-kai (920 votes).

In the 2015 District Council election, People Power failed to win a seat while chairwoman Erica Yuen who ran in South Horizons West again did not win a seat.

The Frontier left the People Power coalition in April 2016 after five years of alliance.

In the 2016 LegCo elections, the People Power formed an electoral alliance with another radical democrat party League of Social Democrats. The alliance won two seats in total with two incumbents Leung Kwok-hung and Ray Chan re-elected in the New Territories East. Retiring incumbent Albert Chan failed to help Wong Ho-ming to be elected despite him standing as a second candidate in the New Territories West. After the election, People Power chairwoman Erica Yuen resigned from the office for the election defeat.

=== 2020 election and national security law ===
Raymond Chan and Tam Tak-chi represented People Power and joined the 2020 legislative election, after winning the pro-democracy primaries earlier. Both said they would not sign the confirmation form to declaring upholding the Basic Law. The election was then delayed by the Hong Kong Government citing the pandemic, while the legislative session was extended by the Chinese Government for a year. Chan resigned as MP on 30 September 2020, the original end date for the session, arguing the extension was unconstitutional.

People Power was under pressure after the imposition of the national security law and the arrest of democrats, including Chan and Tam. After Chan resigned as the party chairman and quitted the party in May 2021, Leung Ka-shing became the acting chairman. However, in December 2021, Leung was accused of attempting nominating a non-member as an executive of the party, reportedly filling up the vacancy by former vice-chairlady Chin Po-fun. 38 members left the party to protest the move, including Tam Tak-chi and So Ho, the two vice-chairmen, and former chairman Christopher Lau. As a result, the party membership shrunk to around 10.

On 22 August 2025, the Hong Kong government gazetted notices to strike off close to 300 groups including various defunct pro-democracy groups from the societies registry, unless they could provide proof of their existence within three months. People Power was among the groups and is believed to be no longer operating. The group is believed to have been removed from the list of societies after the three months notification period ended in November.

== Coalition members ==
- Power Voters
- Progressive Democratic Alliance

=== Former coalition members ===
- Democratic Alliance (2011–12)
- The Frontier (2011–16)
- Proletariat Political Institute (2011–13)

== Leadership ==
=== List of chairmen ===
- Christopher Lau Gar-hung, 2011–13
- Erica Yuen Mi-ming, 2013–16
- Raymond Chan Chi-chuen, 2016–21
- Leung Ka-shing, 2021–25

== Performance in elections ==
=== Legislative Council elections ===
Election	Number of popular votes	% of popular votes	GC seats	FC seats	EC seats	Total seats	+/−	Position
2012	176,250	9.73	3	0		3 / 70	1▲	7th
2016	91,166▼	5.87▼	1	0		1 / 70	1▼	10th▼
2021	did not contest		0	0	0	0 / 90	1▼	N/A

=== District Council elections ===
Election	Number of popular votes	% of popular votes	Total elected seats	+/−
2011	23,465	1.99	1 / 412	1▼
2015	11,503▼	0.80▼	0 / 431	0
2019	8,149▼	0.28▼	1 / 452	1▲
