= Raymond Chan Chi-chuen =

Hong Kong politician (born 1972)

- 陳志全
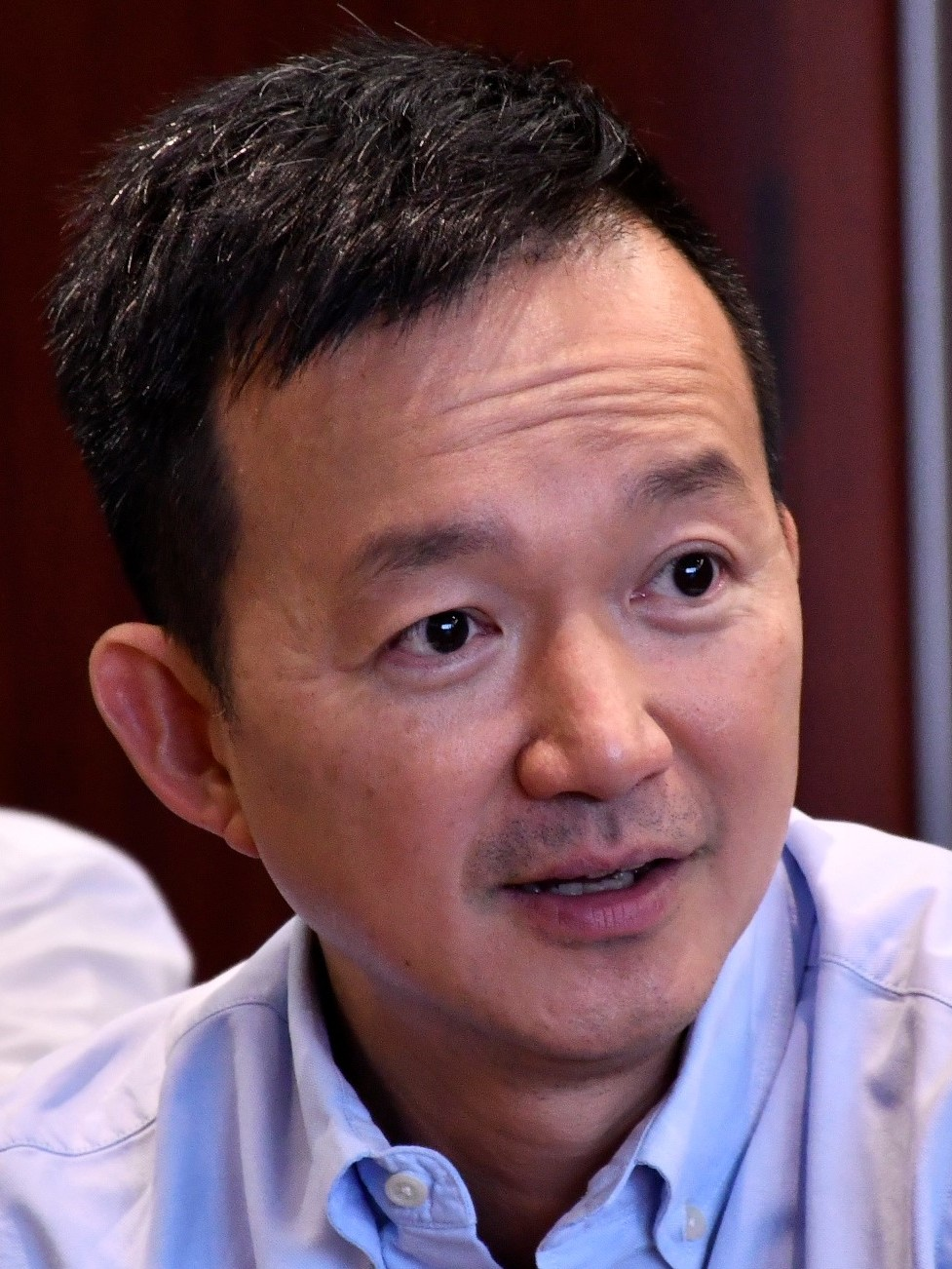
- Chan Chi-chuen in 2018

Chairman of People Power
- In office 10 September 2016 – 2 May 2021
- Preceded by: Erica Yuen
- Succeeded by: Leung Ka-shing

Member of the Legislative Council
- In office 1 October 2012 – 30 September 2020
- Preceded by: Wong Sing-chi
- Succeeded by: Constituency abolished
- Constituency: New Territories East

Personal details
- Born: 16 April 1972 (age 54) Hong Kong
- Party: People Power (2011–2021)
- Spouse: Francis (m. 2021)
- Education: Chinese University of Hong Kong (BSocSc in Sociology)
- Occupation: Presenter; Radio commentator Politician

Raymond Chan Chi-chuen
- Traditional Chinese: 陳志全
Transcriptions
Standard Mandarin
- Hanyu Pinyin: Chén Zhìquán
Yue: Cantonese
- Yale Romanization: Chàhn Ji chyùhn
- Jyutping: Can^{4} Zi^{3} cyun^{4}

Raymond Chan Chi-chuen (born 16 April 1972 in Hong Kong, Chinese: 陳志全), also called Slow Beat (慢必) in his radio career, is a former member of the Legislative Council of Hong Kong (representing the New Territories East constituency), presenter and former chief executive officer of Hong Kong Reporter.

Chan is the first openly gay legislator in Hong Kong and East Asia. He resigned from the Legislative Council on 28 September 2020, citing that he would not serve in an "appointed legislature" after Beijing had extended the legislators' terms by a year. Chan, along with most other pro-democracy politicians in Hong Kong, is currently imprisoned.

== Education ==
Chan graduated from the Chinese University of Hong Kong in 1994 with a Bachelor of Social Science degree in Sociology.

== Career ==
In the early 1990s, under the stage name Slow Beat, he teamed up with Tam Tak-chi (aka Fast Beat) to host a radio show on Commercial Radio Hong Kong, known as Fast Slow Beats, with help from Winnie Yu. The duo gained popularity when they hosted Challengers of Fire on Asia Television in 1997, but left the show one year later. They remained partners after joining Metro Showbiz in 2000 until Chan quit his career as radio host in 2007. He then spent one year practicing Buddhism in Japan. He returned as radio host at Internet radio station Hong Kong Reporter in 2010 and was named its chief executive officer in 2011.

Ray Chan is a Buddhist. In early 2009, he was a Buddhist monk in a Japanese temple, and he can read some fundamental Sanskrit.

In September 2010, along with several fellow hosts of Hong Kong Reporter, Chan became a co-founder and deputy spokesperson of political group Power Voters (later part of People Power), whose objective was to oppose the Democratic Party in the 2011 district council elections. Chan failed to challenge Democrat Lee Wing-tat in Lai Wah of Kwai Tsing District Council.

In 2012, he teamed up with Erica Yuen in running for the Legislative Council election and was ultimately elected. After the election, he came out as a gay man and voiced his support for LGBT rights in Hong Kong, including the legislation of the Sexual Orientation Discrimination Ordinance.

With the successful strategic voting among the pro-democracy voters, Chan was one of the five non-establishment candidates to be re-elected in the 2016 election with 45,993 votes. In the 2017 Chief Executive election, he supported radical legislator Leung Kwok-hung of the League of Social Democrats (LSD) to run for the Chief Executive through an unofficial civil petition, despite the mainstream pro-democrats backing former Financial Secretary John Tsang.

On 4 June, in an attempt to disrupt the third reading of the National Anthem Bill at the Legislative Council, Chan and fellow lawmaker Eddie Chu attempted to disperse pungent liquid towards the President of the Legislative Council, Andrew Leung. They were stopped before they could reach the rostrum; Chan dropped the liquid and a lantern on the floor. On 16 June, Legislative Council president Leung announced that Chan and Chu would be fined roughly HK$100,000 each for their actions. Chu declared the same day that he and Chan would examine and possibly challenge the decision.

Chan resigned from the Legislative Council on 28 September 2020, citing that he would not serve in an "appointed legislature". Prior to his resignation, the Legislative Council term had been extended, upon authorization by the central government on request of the Hong Kong government, by a year in order to resolve the limbo that had been created by the postponement of the 2020 legislative election.

In a brief statement issued through his sister on 2 May 2021, Chan, who was in jail at that time, announced that he was quitting People Power and withdrawing from politics.

== Arrests ==
Chan was arrested on 1 November 2020, along with six other democrats, in connection with a melee that had broken out in the LegCo on 8 May 2020.

On 6 January 2021, Chan was among 53 members of the pro-democratic camp who were arrested under the national security law, specifically its provision regarding alleged subversion. The group stood accused of the organisation of and participation in unofficial primary elections held by the camp in July 2020. Chan was briefly released on bail on 7 January, but returned to custody on 28 February along with most others charged.

On 16 September 2021, Chan was released on bail after his application was granted by High Court judge Esther Toh. On 2 November, High Court judge Esther Toh upheld her decision to grant bail to Chan because he had a history of cooperating with the government during his time in the legislature, he had been named by LegCo president Andrew Leung as the most diligent lawmaker, and he had previously supported some government bills.

On 30 May 2024, Chan was found guilty of subversion in the primaries case, along with 13 other defendants.

Legislative Council of Hong Kong
Preceded by Wong Sing-chi	Member of Legislative Council; Representative for New Territories East; 2012–2020	Constituency abolished
Party political offices
Preceded by Erica Yuen	Chairman of People Power; 2016–2021	Succeeded by Leung Ka-shing
