= Christopher Lau =

Hong Kong politician (born 1976)

Christopher Lau Gar-hung
- 劉嘉鴻
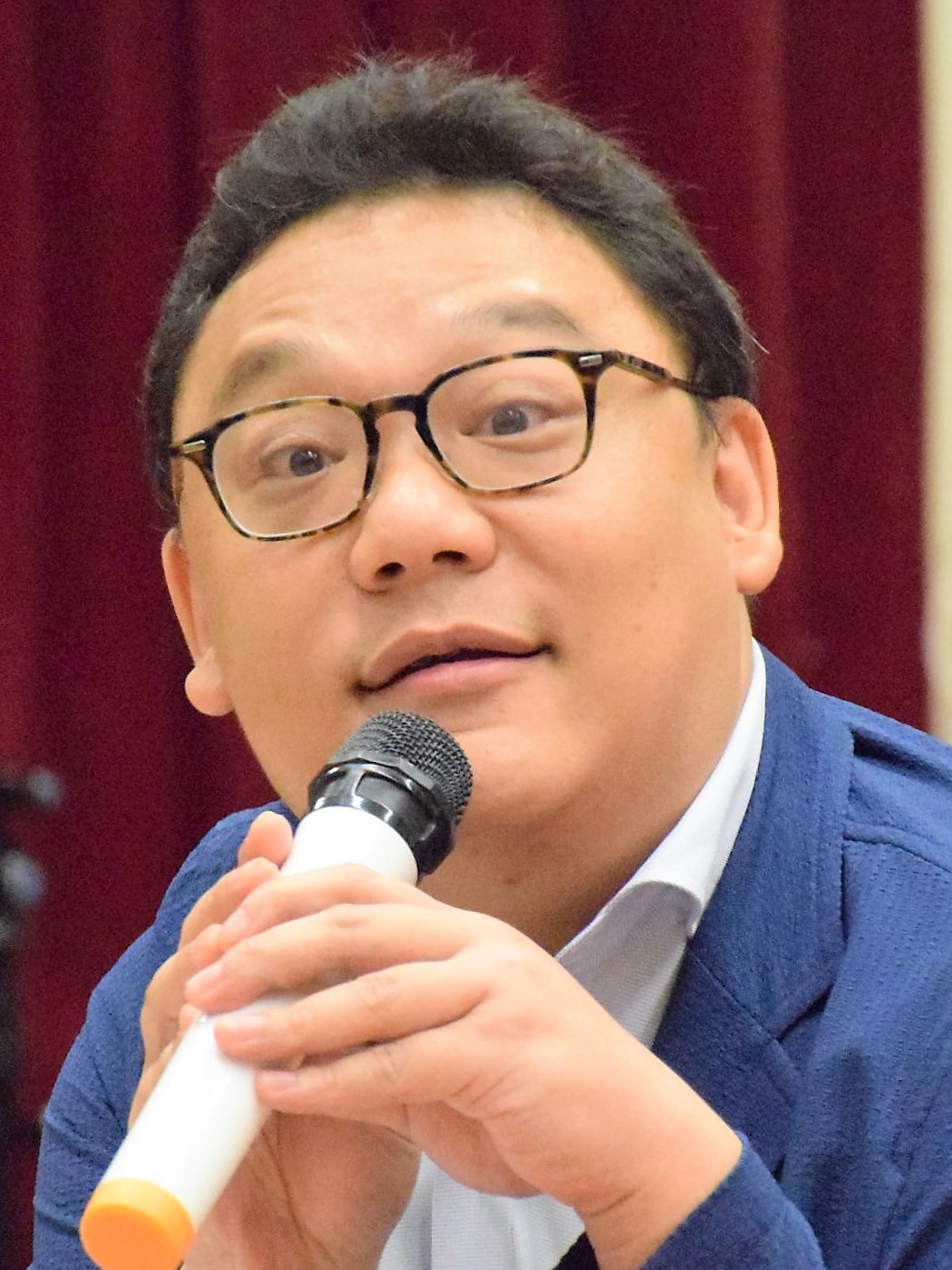

Chairman of People Power
- In office 10 July 2011 – 20 June 2013

Personal details
- Born: 8 February 1976 (age 50) Hong Kong
- Party: People Power
- Education: Chinese University of Hong Kong
- Profession: Presenter, financial consultant

Christopher Lau Gar-hung (born 8 February 1976 in Hong Kong; Chinese: 劉嘉鴻; Cantonese Yale: Làuh Gā Hùhng) is the former chairman of People Power political party in Hong Kong. He is a presenter for Hong Kong People Reporter and MyRadio. He ran for office in the 2012 Hong Kong legislative election.

== Background ==
Lau studied in Diocesan Boys' School for secondary school and graduated from Chinese University of Hong Kong with a degree in Mathematics. He worked as a retirement benefits consultant in multiple companies. In 2012, he teamed up Stephen Shiu and Jeff Au-yeung to run in the Hong Kong legislative election.

== WWE & Company ==
WWE & Company is a fashion, beauty and lifestyle technology company specialising in the development of mobile, cloud-based, O2O commerce enterprise technologies, targeting the mainland Chinese consumers. WWE & Company was founded and led by Lau and Thomson Cheng, President of Walton Brown. WWE is a joint venture between The Wharf (Holdings) Limited (SEHK: 4), Walton Brown Group (a company of The Lane Crawford Joyce Group), and eCargo Holdings Limited (ASX:ECG), initially capitalised at RMB 300 million.

Walton Brown and ECG jointly invested RMB 150 million for an initial 50% equity interest and The Wharf (Holdings) Limited, which operates Harbour City and Times Square in Hong Kong, will co-invest another RMB 150 million for a 50% equity interest through Novel Colour, a wholly owned subsidiary.

WWE is headquartered in Hong Kong and has an office in Shanghai.

== Chairman Resignation ==
On 20 June 2013, Lau resigned from the People Power chairman, but he denied this related to internal disputes with former party member, Wong Yuk-man.

Party political offices
New political party	Chairman of People Power; 2011–2013	Succeeded by Erica Yuen
