= Hong Kong Reporter =

Internet radio station in Hong Kong

Hong Kong Reporter (Chinese: 香港人網; formerly known as Hong Kong People Reporter) was an Internet radio station and forum based in Hong Kong. Established in 2008, the station mainly focused on live talk radio broadcasting although it later expanded into other types of programming. On 22 March 2013, owner Stephen Shiu announced that broadcasting would cease at the end of that month.

The online broadcaster had begun as People's Station in 2004 after two outspoken pro-democratic talk-show hosts Wong Yuk-man and Albert Cheng were fired by Commercial Radio Hong Kong. It changed its name to Hong Kong Reporter in 2005 and merged with the then chairman of the League of Social Democrats, Wong Yuk-man's internet radio station MyRadio in 2008. In 2010, the two groups parted ways.

Hong Kong Reporter was closely affiliated with the democratic party League of Social Democrats before Wong Yuk-man quit to form People Power. It was seen as a key platform for young progressive voices and helped to mobilise the supporters of People Power. The station's founder, Stephen Shiu, had threatened to take the station offline if at least three People Power candidates were not elected in the 2012 Legco elections. Among the People Power candidates elected was the station's CEO, Raymond Chan Chi-chuen. The station has also been used to direct protesters in the 1 July marches.

On 22 March 2013, Stephen Shiu said during his ShiuShiu Podcast that the station would not broadcast any new shows from March 31. It would also stop funding political groups, including People Power and its affiliate, the Proletariat Political Institute.
