= Fung Ting Court =

Public housing estate in Yuen Long, Hong Kong

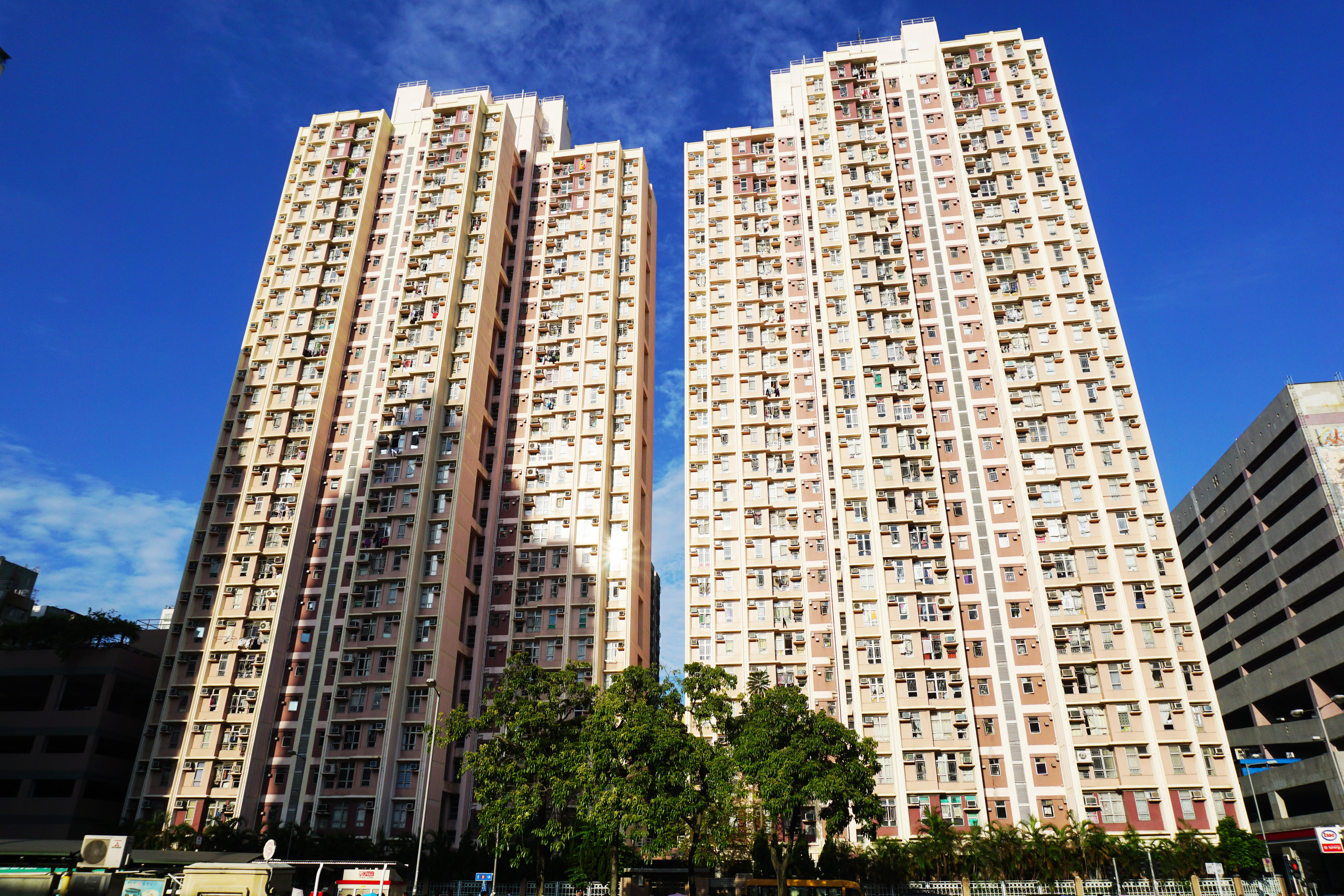
- Fung Ting Court
- Interactive map of Fung Ting Court

General information
- Location: 8 Fung Cheung Road, Yuen Long; New Territories, Hong Kong
- Coordinates: 22.442938°N 114.03199°E
- Status: Completed
- Category: Home Ownership Scheme
- No. of blocks: 2
- No. of units: 312

Construction
- Constructed: 2001; 25 years ago
- Authority: Hong Kong Housing Authority

Fung Ting Court (Chinese: 鳳庭苑) is a Home Ownership Scheme court developed by the Hong Kong Housing Authority in Yuen Long Town, New Territories, Hong Kong near Fung Kam Street Sports Centre. Formerly the site of Yuen Long Factory Estate (Chinese: 元朗工廠大廈), the factory estate was built by the Resettlement Department in 1966, in order to relocate squatter factories and cottage workshops. In 1973, the management of the estate was taken over by the Hong Kong Housing Authority. In 1997, the clearance of the estate was completed. In 2001, two small blocks were built in the site.

== Houses ==
Name	Chinese name	Building type	Completed
Yan Ting House	茵庭閣	Concord 2	2001
Wa Ting House	華庭閣	Concord 2	2001

== Politics ==
Fung Ting Court is located in Fung Cheung constituency of the Yuen Long District Council. It was formerly represented by Johnny Mak Ip-sing, who was elected in the 2019 elections until July 2021.

== See also ==
- Public housing estates in Yuen Long
