= 2019 Yuen Long District Council election =

Hong Kong local election

- 24 November 2019

39 (of the 45) seats to Yuen Long District Council 23 seats needed for a majority
- Turnout: 69.9% ▲26.5%
	First party	Second party	Third party
Party	Democratic	TSW Connection	Team Chu
Last election	2 seats, 7.5%	New party	New party
Seats before	2	0	0
Seats won	7	4	4
Seat change	▲5	▲4	▲4
Popular vote	26,809	15,998	15,757
Percentage	11.0%	6.6%	6.5%
Swing	▲3.5%	N/A	N/A
	Fourth party	Fifth party	Sixth party
Party	Action 18	Democratic Alliance	Civic Passion
Last election	New party	1 seat, 3.6%	Did not contest
Seats before	0	1	0
Seats won	2	2	1
Seat change	▲2	▲1	▲1
Popular vote	9,006	6,369	4,454
Percentage	3.7%	2.7%	1.8%
Swing	N/A	▼1.9%	N/A
	Seventh party	Eighth party	Ninth party
Party	NWSC	DAB	FTU
Last election	Did not contest	6 seats, 20.4%	4 seats, 8.3%
Seats before	0	5	4
Seats won	1	0	0
Seat change	▲1	▼5	▼4
Popular vote	3,513	28,087	13,291
Percentage	1.4%	11.5%	5.5%
Swing	N/A	▼8.9%	▼2.8%
- Colours on map indicate winning party for each constituency.

The 2019 Yuen Long District Council election was held on 24 November 2019 to elect all 39 elected members to the 45-member Yuen Long District Council.

The pro-Beijing and rural domination was turned over in the historic landslide victory where the pro-democrats took over all the urban constituencies and a few rural constituencies amid the massive pro-democracy protests. As a results, the pro-democrats took 33 of the 39 elected seats and seized control of the 45-member council for the first time.

== Overall election results ==
Before election:

↓
5	36
Pro-dem	Pro-Beijing

Change in composition:

↓
33	12
Pro-democracy	Pro-Beijing

Yuen Long District Council election result 2019
Party	Seats	Gains	Losses	Net gain/loss	Seats %	Votes %	Votes	+/−
Independent	17	13	15	−2	37.8	43.8	106,481	
DAB	0	0	5	−5	0.0	11.5	28,087	−8.9
Democratic	7	2	0	+5	17.9	11.0	26,809	+3.5
TSW Connection	4	4	0	+4	10.3	6.6	15,998	
Team Chu	4	4	0	+4	10.3	6.5	15,757	
FTU	0	0	4	−4	0.0	5.5	13,291	−2.8
Action 18	2	2	0	+2	5.1	3.7	9,006	
Democratic Alliance	2	1	0	+1	5.1	2.7	6,469	–1.9
BPA	0	0	1	−1	0.0	2.3	5,492	
Civic Passion	1	1	0	+1	2.6	1.8	4,454	
Roundtable	0	0	1	−1	0.0	1.7	4,025	
PfD	1	1	0	+1	2.6	1.6	3,929	
NWSC	1	1	0	+1	2.6	1.4	3,513	
BPA	0	0	0	0	0	0.4	362	
