= Wang Fu Court =

Public housing estate in Yuen Long, Hong Kong

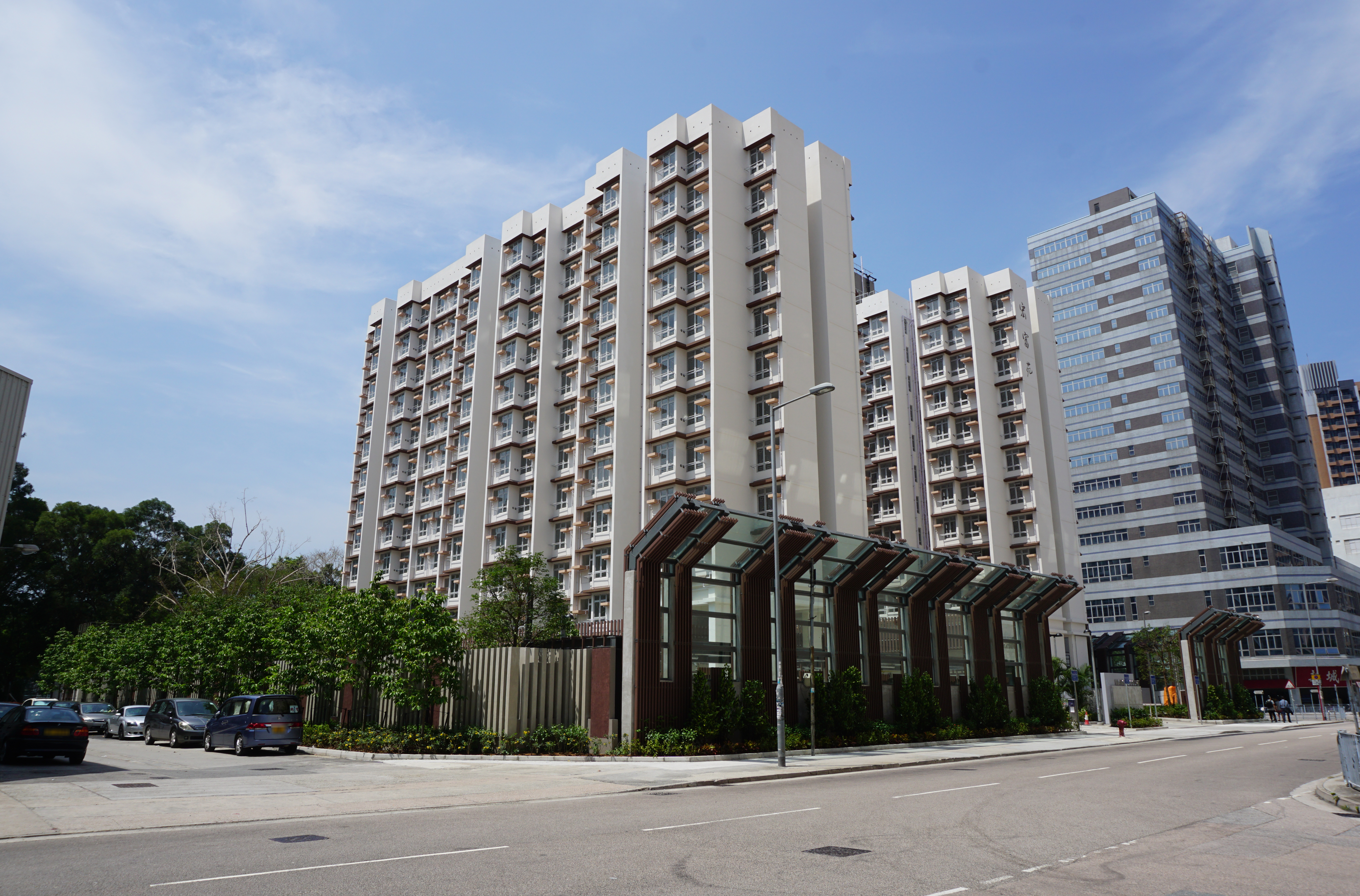
- Wang Fu Court
- Interactive map of Wang Fu Court

General information
- Location: 29 Wang Yip Street West, Yuen Long; New Territories, Hong Kong
- Coordinates: 22.4507226°N 114.0279981°E
- Status: Completed
- Category: Home Ownership Scheme
- No. of blocks: 1
- No. of units: 229

Construction
- Constructed: 2017; 9 years ago
- Authority: Hong Kong Housing Authority

Wang Fu Court (Chinese: 宏富苑) is a Home Ownership Scheme court developed by the Hong Kong Housing Authority in Yuen Long, New Territories, Hong Kong next to Yuen Long Nullah. It comprises a single residential block in the Tung Tau Industrial Area completed in 2017.

== Houses ==
Name	Chinese name	Building type	Completed
Wang Fu Court	宏富苑	Non-standard	2017

== Politics ==
Wang Fu Court is located in Yuen Long Tung Tau constituency of the Yuen Long District Council. It was formerly represented by Lam Ting-wai, who was elected in the 2019 elections until July 2021.

== See also ==
- Public housing estates in Yuen Long
