= 2015 Yuen Long District Council election =

Hong Kong local election

- 22 November 2015

35 (of the 41) seats to Yuen Long District Council 22 seats needed for a majority
- Turnout: 43.4%
	First party	Second party	Third party
Party	DAB	FTU	NPP
Last election	7 seats, 15.7%	2 seats, 4.9%	1 seat, 1.4%
Seats before	5	4	2
Seats won	6	4	3
Seat change	▲1	Steady	▲1
Popular vote	19,668	7,991	8,431
Percentage	20.4%	8.3%	8.8%
Swing	▲4.7%	▲3.4%	▲7.4%
	Fourth party	Fifth party	Sixth party
Party	Democratic	Democratic Alliance	Liberal
Last election	2 seats, 11.2%	1 seat, 6.0%	2 seats, 5.2%
Seats before	2	1	1
Seats won	2	1	1
Seat change	Steady	Steady	Steady
Popular vote	7,212	4,449	1,941
Percentage	7.5%	4.6%	2.0%
Swing	▼3.7%	▼1.2%	▼3.2%
	Seventh party
Party	NTAS
Last election	1 seat, 2.9%
Seats before	1
Seats won	1
Seat change	Steady
Popular vote	Uncontested
Percentage	N/A
Swing	N/A
- Colours on map indicate winning party for each constituency.

The 2015 Yuen Long District Council election was held on 22 November 2015 to elect all 35 elected members to the 41-member Yuen Long District Council.

== Overall election results ==
Before election:

↓
4	27
PD	Pro-Beijing

Change in composition:

↓
5	30
PD	Pro-Beijing

Yuen Long District Council election result 2015
Party	Seats	Gains	Losses	Net gain/loss	Seats %	Votes %	Votes	+/−
Independent	18	4	3	+1	48.6	43.7	42,145	
DAB	6	1	0	+1	17.1	20.4	19,668	+4.7
NPP	3	1	0	+1	8.6	8.8	8,431	+7.4
FTU	4	4	0	0	11.4	8.3	7,991	+3.4
Democratic	2	0	0	0	5.7	7.5	7,212	–3.7
Democratic Alliance	1	0	0	0	2.9	4.6	4,449	–1.4
NTAS	1	1	0	+1	3.2	2.9	2,187	
Liberal	1	0	0	0	5.7	2.0	1,941	−3.2
Land Justice League	0	0	0	0	0	1.5	1,482	–0.9
Labour	0	0	0	0	0	1.4	1,339	
TSWNF	0	0	0	0	0	1.4	1,317	
BPA	0	0	0	0	0	0.4	362	
