= China Youth Service & Recreation Center =

China Youth Service & Recreation Center 神州青年服務社
- Founded: 1977
- Headquarters: Room 101, 1/F, Wilson House, 75-75A Tai Po Road, Sham Shui Po, Hong Kong
- Ideology: Anti-communism (HK); Social conservatism; Three Principles of the People
- Political position: Right-wing
- Regional affiliation: Pro-ROC camp Pro-democracy camp

Party flag
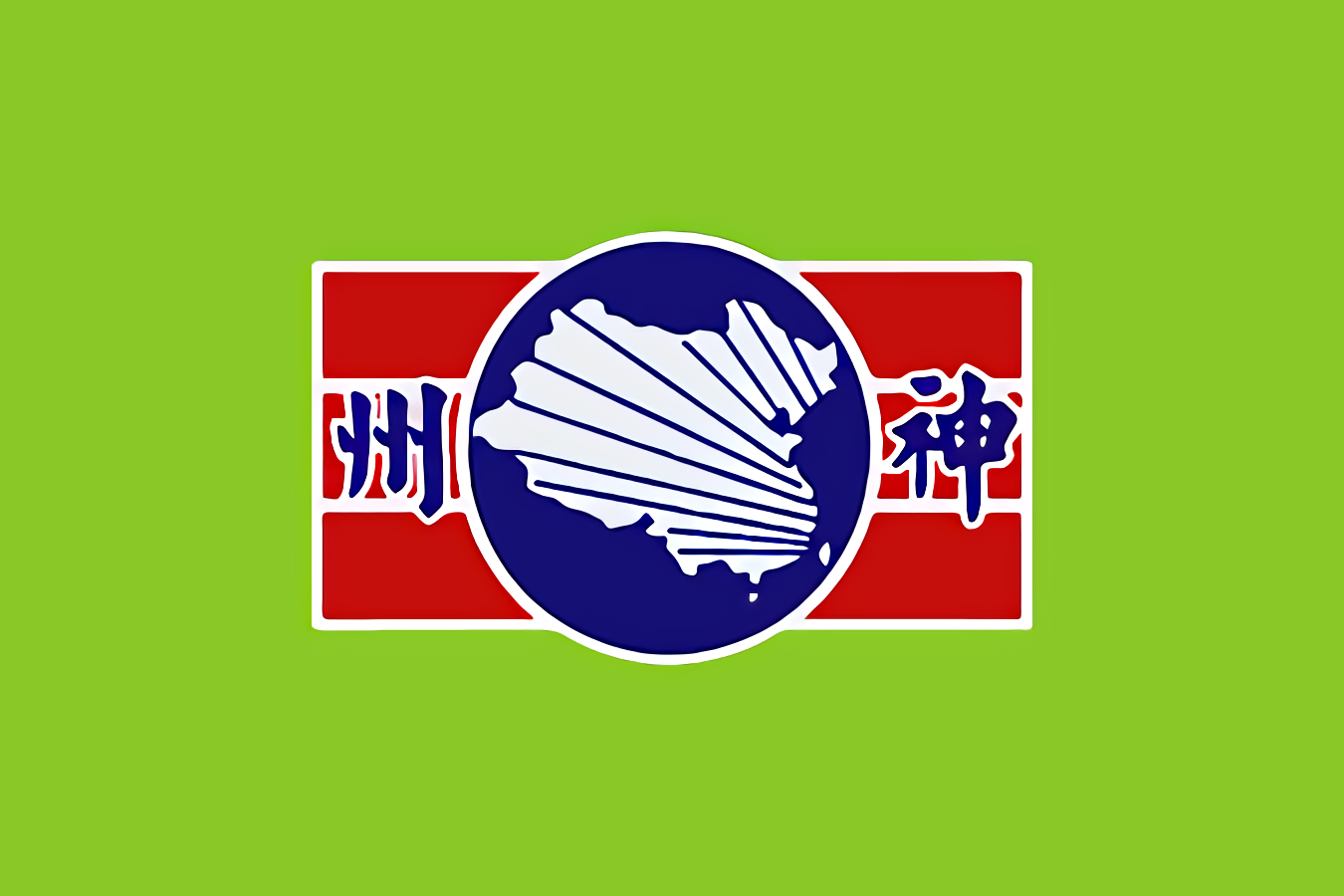

China Youth Service & Recreation Center (CYSRC; Chinese: 神州青年服務社) is a Hong Kong political group that supported the Republic of China (Taiwan). Founded in 1977, CYSRC supported the democratic unification of China under the Three Principles of the People and democratization in China and Hong Kong. It is one of the remaining pro-democracy associations in Hong Kong following the dissolution of many allies in the aftermath of the 2020 national security law.

== Visions ==
On the national level, CYSRC advocates the democratic unification of China under Three Principles of the People and more interactions between Taiwan and China, as well as supporting patriotic education to remember the War of Resistance and to demand war reparations from Japan. It calls for vindicating the 1989 Tiananmen protests and agrees with democratizating China. The group supported educational volunteering in northern Thailand.

In Hong Kong, the association supports the democracy movement and instilling popular sovereignty through universal suffrage and education for civil rights. They aim to serve the grassroots in the community, especially the residents in Nam Cheong Estate of the Sham Shui Po District, and protect the rights of the citizens, while providing community and volunteer services such as recreational activities for the youths.

== Members ==
Most of the members of the group are Hongkongers, who joined after coming across the flag of the Republic of China at protests and showed interests in understanding more.

== Leadership ==
- Leung Hon-wa (1999–2007), Sham Shui Po District councillor from 1999 to 2007
- Lam Wai-tong (2008–16)
- 陳穎志 (2016–17)
- 陳志宏 (2017–18)
- Cheng Chung-man (2018–20), Sai Kung District councillor from 2019 to 2021
