= Shap Pat Heung East (constituency) =

Hong Kong constituency

- Elected constituency for the Yuen Long District Council
- Boundary of Shap Pat Heung East in Yuen Long District
- District: Yuen Long
- Legislative Council constituency: New Territories North West
- Population: 13,766 (2019)
- Electorate: 5,718 (2019)

Current constituency
- Created: 2015
- Number of members: One
- Member: Vacant
- Created from: Shap Pat Heung North, Shap Pat Heung South, San Tin

Shap Pat Heung East (Chinese: 十八鄉東) is one of the 31 constituencies in the Yuen Long District of Hong Kong.

The constituency returns one district councillor to the Yuen Long District Council, with an election every four years. Shap Pat Heung East constituency is loosely based on eastern part of Shap Pat Heung including Long Shin Estate with estimated population of 13,766.

== Councillors represented ==
Election	Member	Party
2015	Shum Ho-kit	Nonpartisan
2019	Lee Chun-wai→Vacant	Action 18

== Election results ==
=== 2010s ===
Yuen Long District Council Election, 2019: Shap Pat Heung East
Party	Candidate	Votes	%	±%
PfD	Lee Chun-wai	1,838	48.04	
Nonpartisan	Lam Tim-fook	1,500	39.21	
Nonpartisan	Wong Pak-yan	488	12.75	
Majority		338	8.83	
Turnout		3,835	67.13	
PfD gain from Nonpartisan		Swing		

Yuen Long District Council Election, 2015: Shap Pat Heung East
Party	Candidate	Votes	%	±%
Nonpartisan	Shum Ho-kit	Uncontested		
Nonpartisan win (new seat)				
