= 2007 Yuen Long District Council election =

Hong Kong local election

- 18 November 2007

29 (of the 42) seats to Yuen Long District Council 22 seats needed for a majority
- Turnout: 39.9%
	First party	Second party
Party	DAB	Liberal
Last election	4 seats, 15.2%	1 seat, 3.6%
Seats before	4	2
Seats won	7	3
Seat change	▲3	▲1
Popular vote	19,645	11,363
Percentage	21.9%	12.6%
Swing	▲6.7%	▼7.4%
	Third party	Fourth party
Party	Democratic	Democratic Alliance
Last election	2 seats, 4.3%	4 seats, 10.7%
Seats before	2	4
Seats won	2	1
Seat change	Steady	▼3
Popular vote	7,260	8,906
Percentage	8.1%	9.9%
Swing	▲3.8%	▼0.8%
- Colours on map indicate winning party for each constituency.

The 2007 Yuen Long District Council election was held on 18 November 2007 to elect all 29 elected members to the 42-member District Council.

== Overall election results ==
Before election:

↓
7	22
Pro-dem	Pro-Beijing

Change in composition:

↓
4	25
PD	Pro-Beijing

Yuen Long District Council election result 2007
Party	Seats	Gains	Losses	Net gain/loss	Seats %	Votes %	Votes	+/−
Independent	16	0	1	−1	55.2	45.2	40.631	
DAB	7	4	1	+3	22.6	21.9	19,645	+6.7
Liberal	3	1	0	+1	6.9	12.6	11,363	
Democratic	2	1	1	0	6.9	8.1	7,260	+3.8
Democratic Alliance	1	0	3	−3	3.4	9.9	8,906	−0.8
LSD	0	0	0	0	0	1.4	1,220	
CTU	0	0	0	0	0	0.9	847	
