= Public housing estates in Yuen Long =

Public housing in Yuen Long, Hong Kong

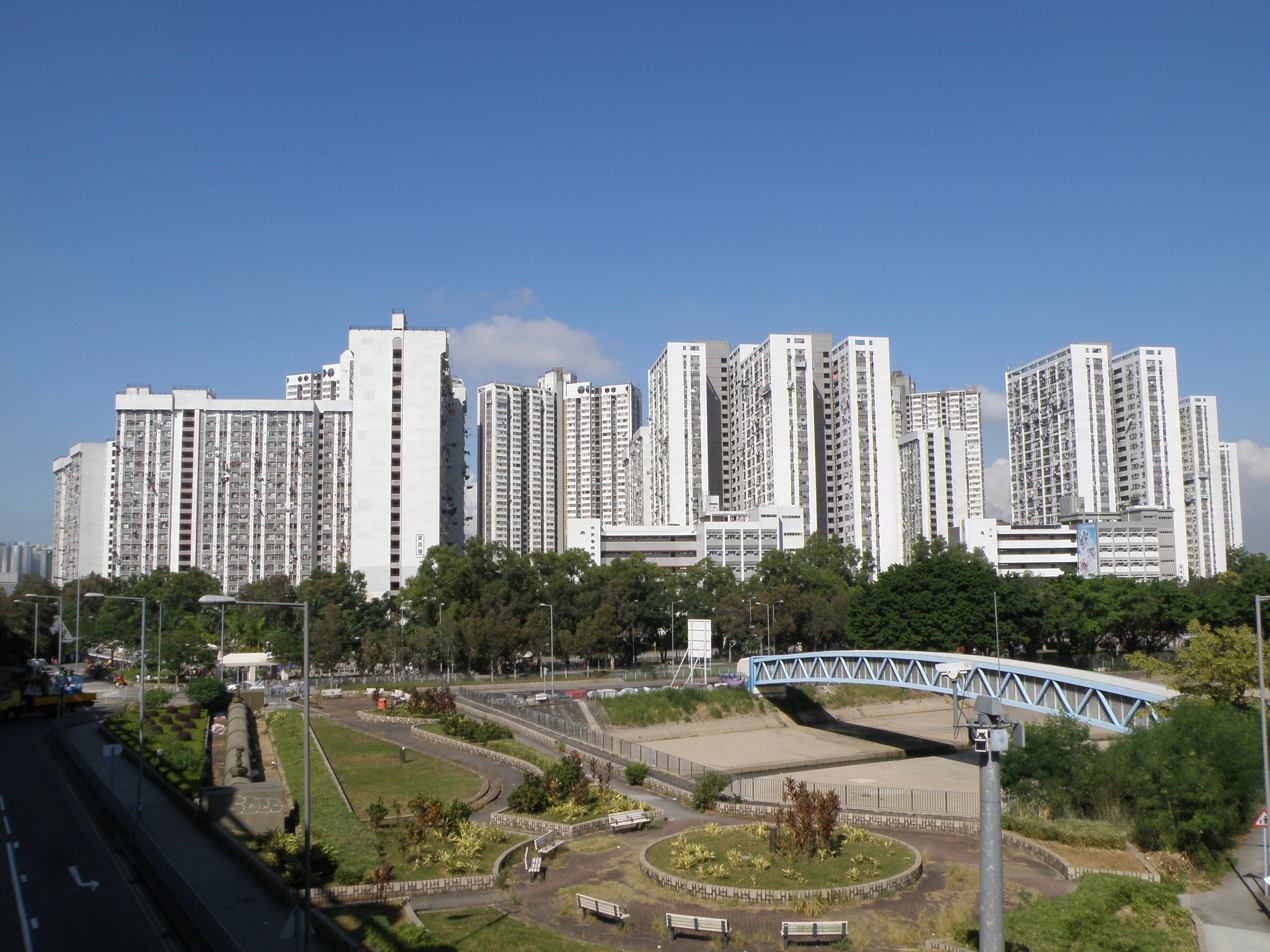
Long Ping Estate, the largest public housing estate in Yuen Long New Town

The following is a list of public housing estates in Yuen Long New Town, Hong Kong, including Home Ownership Scheme (HOS), Private Sector Participation Scheme (PSPS), Sandwich Class Housing Scheme (SCHS), Flat-for-Sale Scheme (FFSS), and Tenants Purchase Scheme (TPS) estates.

== Overview ==
Name		Type	Inaug.	No Blocks	No Units	Notes
Fung Ting Court	鳳庭苑	HOS	2001	2	312	
Long Ching Estate	朗晴邨	Public	2016	2	438	
Long Ping Estate	朗屏邨	TPS	1986	15	7,563	
Long Shin Estate	朗善邨	Public	2017	3	1,203	
Shui Pin Wai Estate	水邊圍邨	Public	1981	7	2,394	
Wang Fu Court	宏富苑	HOS	2017	1	229	

== Fung Ting Court ==
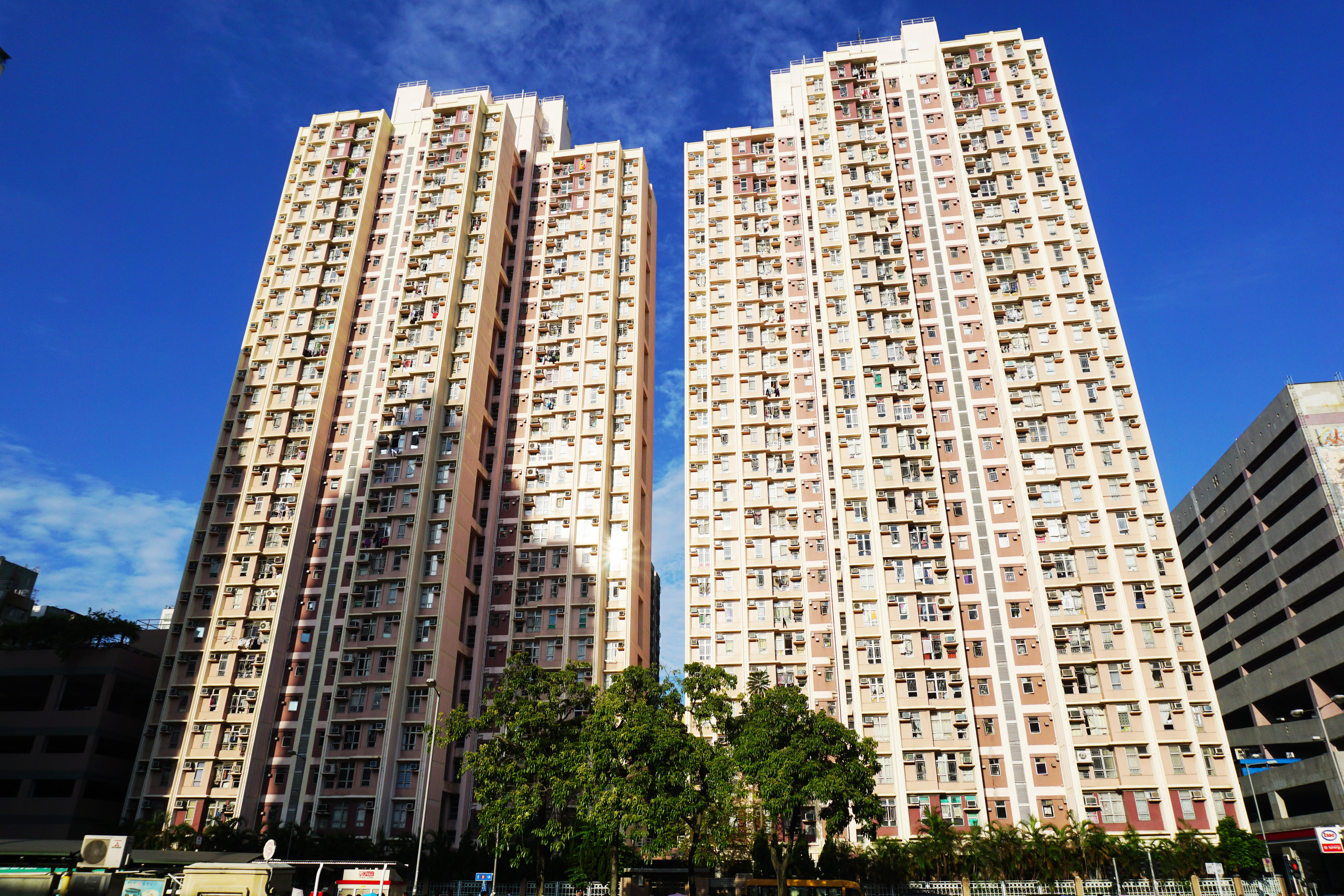
Fung Ting Court

Fung Ting Court (Chinese: 鳳庭苑) is a Home Ownership Scheme in Yuen Long Town. It has 2 blocks built in 2001. It was formerly the site of Yuen Long Factory Estate (Chinese: 元朗工廠大廈). The factory estate was built by the Resettlement Department in 1966, in order to relocate squatter factories and cottage workshops. In 1973, the management of the estate was taken over by the Hong Kong Housing Authority. In 1997, the clearance of the estate was completed. In 2001, two small blocks were built in the site.

Name	Type	Completion
Yan Ting House	Concord 2	2001
Wa Ting House	Concord 2	2001

== Shui Pin Wai Estate ==
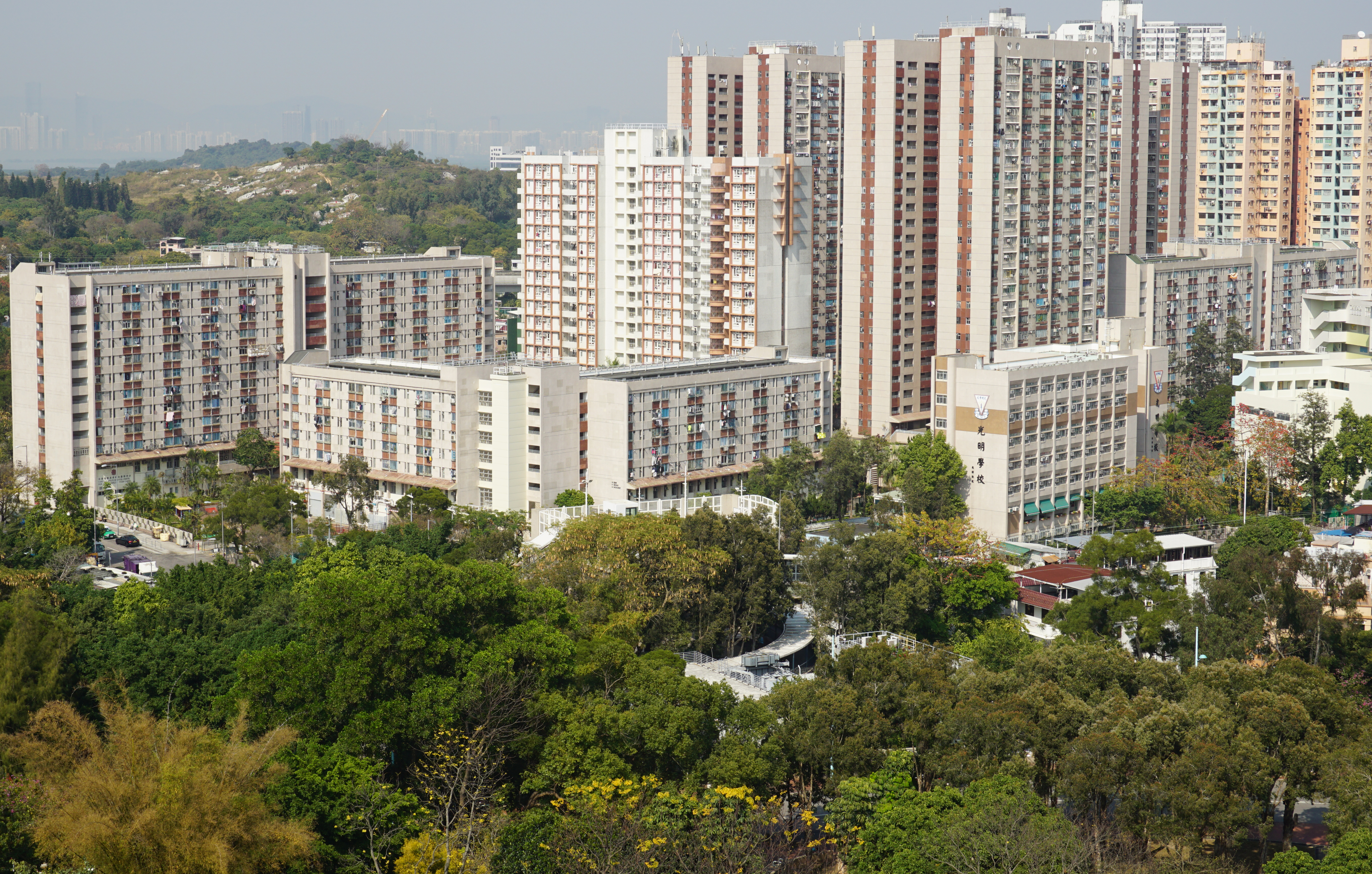
Shui Pin Wai Estate

Shui Pin Wai Estate (Chinese: 水邊圍邨) is the second public housing estate in Yuen Long Town. It has 7 residential blocks mainly built in 1981, but one of the blocks, Dip Shui House, was later built in 1998.

Name	Type	Completion
Bik Shui House	Old Slab	1981
Ying Shui House	Old Slab	1981
Woo Shui House	Old Slab	1981
San Shui House	Single H	1981
Chuen Shui House	Single H	1981
Hong Shui House	Single H	1981
Dip Shui House	Small Household Block	1998

== Long Ching Estate ==
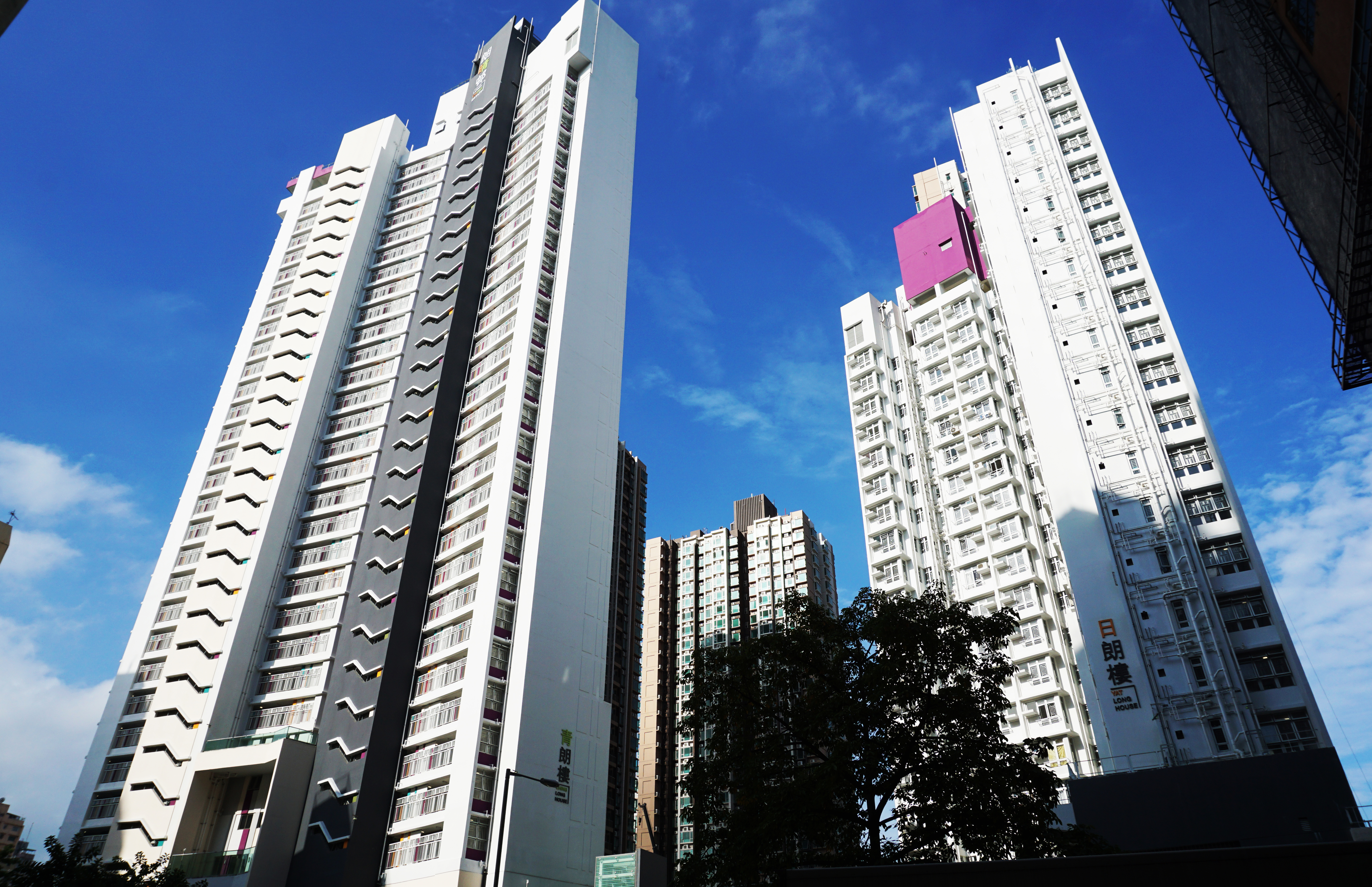
Long Ching Estate

Long Ching Estate (Chinese: 朗晴邨) is the site of the former Yuen Long Estate. The former estate had five buildings and was demolished in 2001. Originally the Housing Authority planned to build three 32-storey blocks on the land. However, the District Council believed the land should be privately developed to boost the local economy. The government eventually divided the land in two, offering part of the site for private development of Yuccie Square.

The new estate comprises two blocks of non-standard design offering 483 flats. It is designed to accommodate about 1400 residents.

English name	Chinese name	Type	Completion
Yat Long House (Block 1)	日朗樓（第1座）	Non-standard	2016
Ching Long House (Block 2)	青朗樓（第2座）	Non-standard	2016

== Long Ping Estate ==
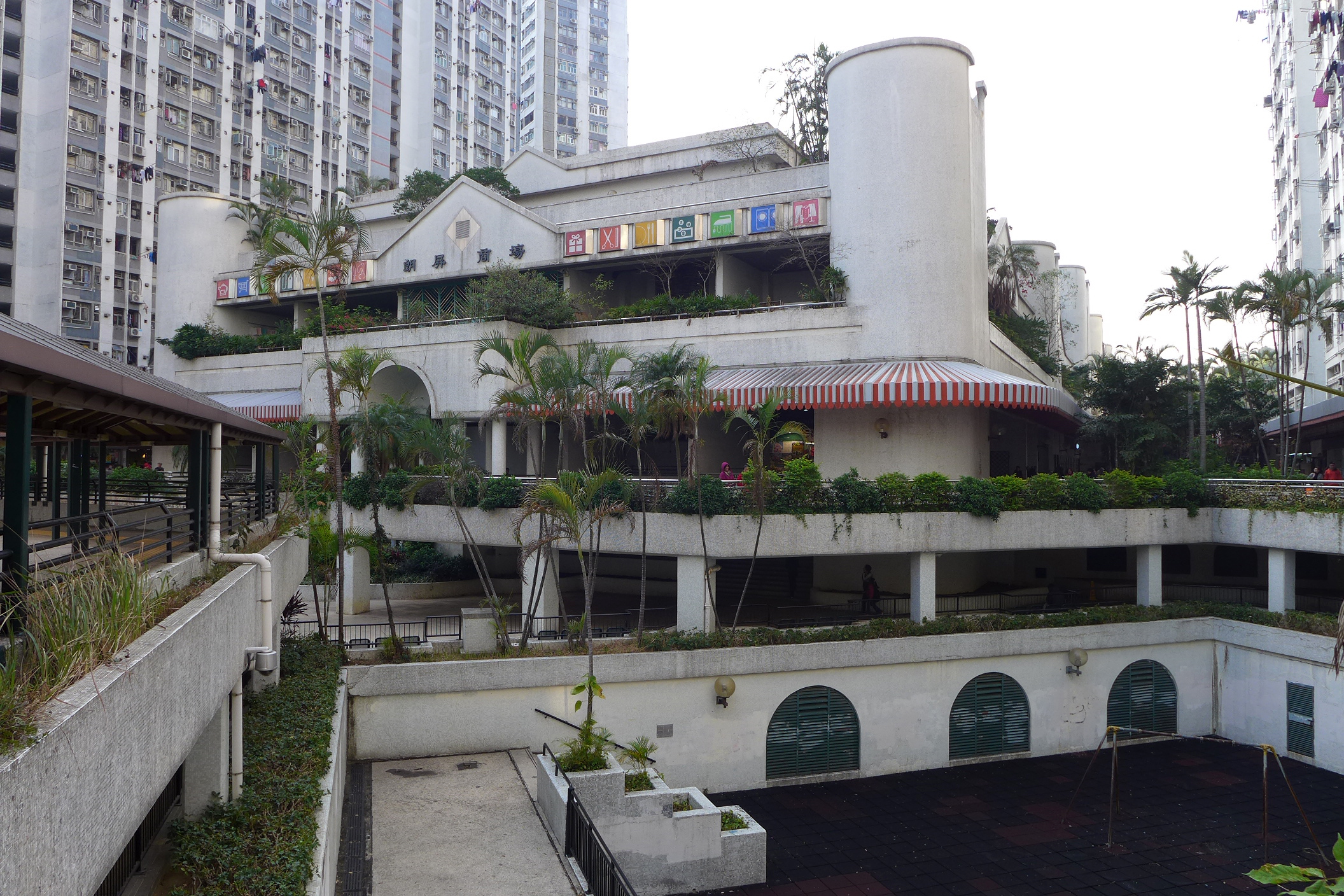
Long Ping Commercial Centre

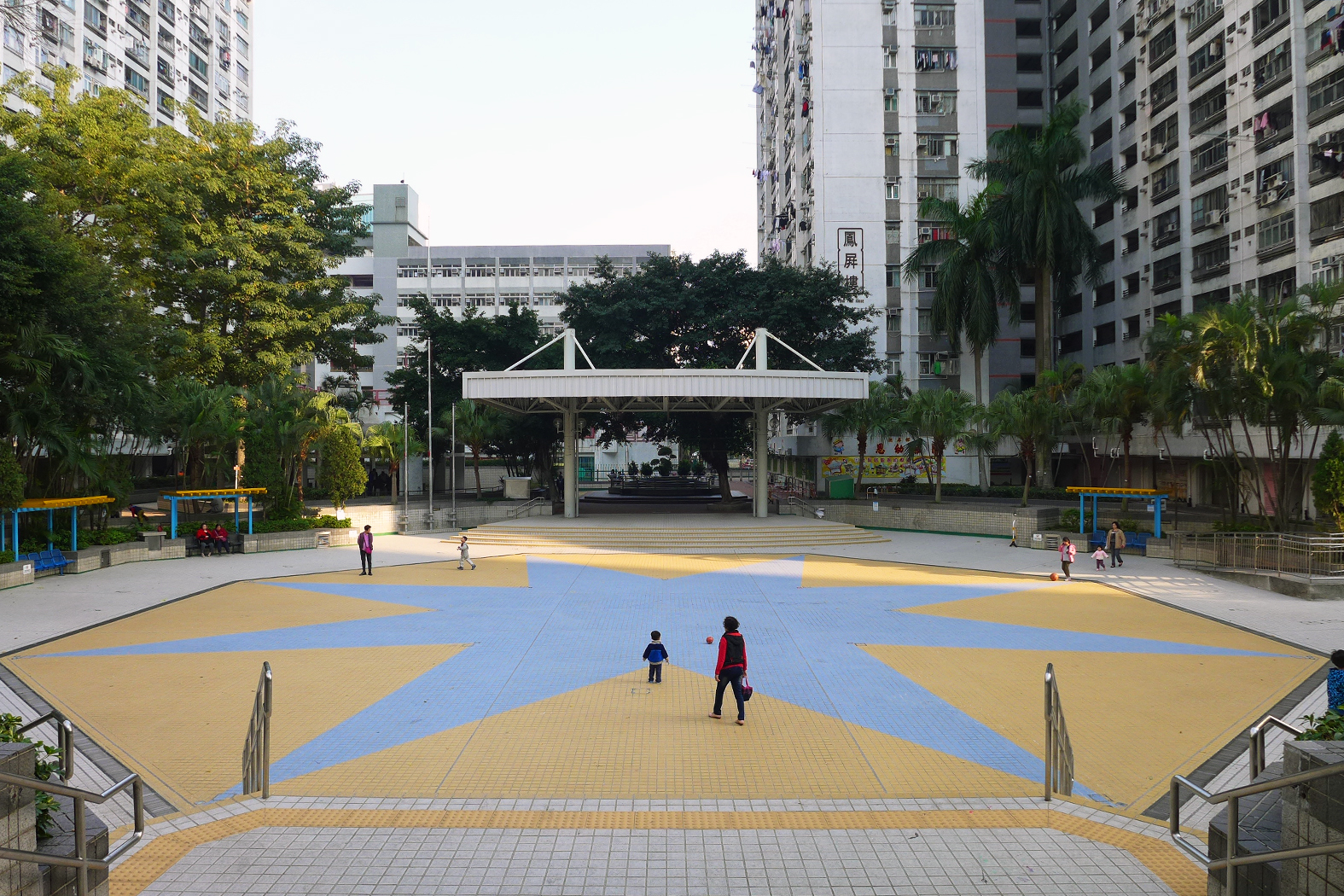
Estate Plaza of Long Ping Estate

Long Ping Estate (Chinese: 朗屏邨) is a mixed public/TPS estate in Wang Chau near MTR Long Ping station. It is the third public housing estate in Yuen Long Town. It has a total of 15 residential blocks completed between 1986 and 1989. In 2005, some of the flats were sold to tenants through Tenants Purchase Scheme Phase 6B.

Name	Type	Completion
Yuet Ping House	New slab	1987
Hor Ping House	New slab	1987
Shek Ping House	New slab	1986
Kang Ping House	New slab	1986
Kam Ping House	Double H	1986
Sau Ping House	Double H	1986
Chu Ping House	Double H	1986
Po Ping House	Double H	1986
Ngan Ping House	Double H	1989
Yin Ping House	Double H	1989
Fung Ping House	Double H	1989
Cheuk Ping House	Double H	1989
Yuk Ping House	Trident 2	1986
Wah Ping House	Trident 2	1989
Hay Ping House	Trident 2	1989

== Long Bin Interim Housing ==
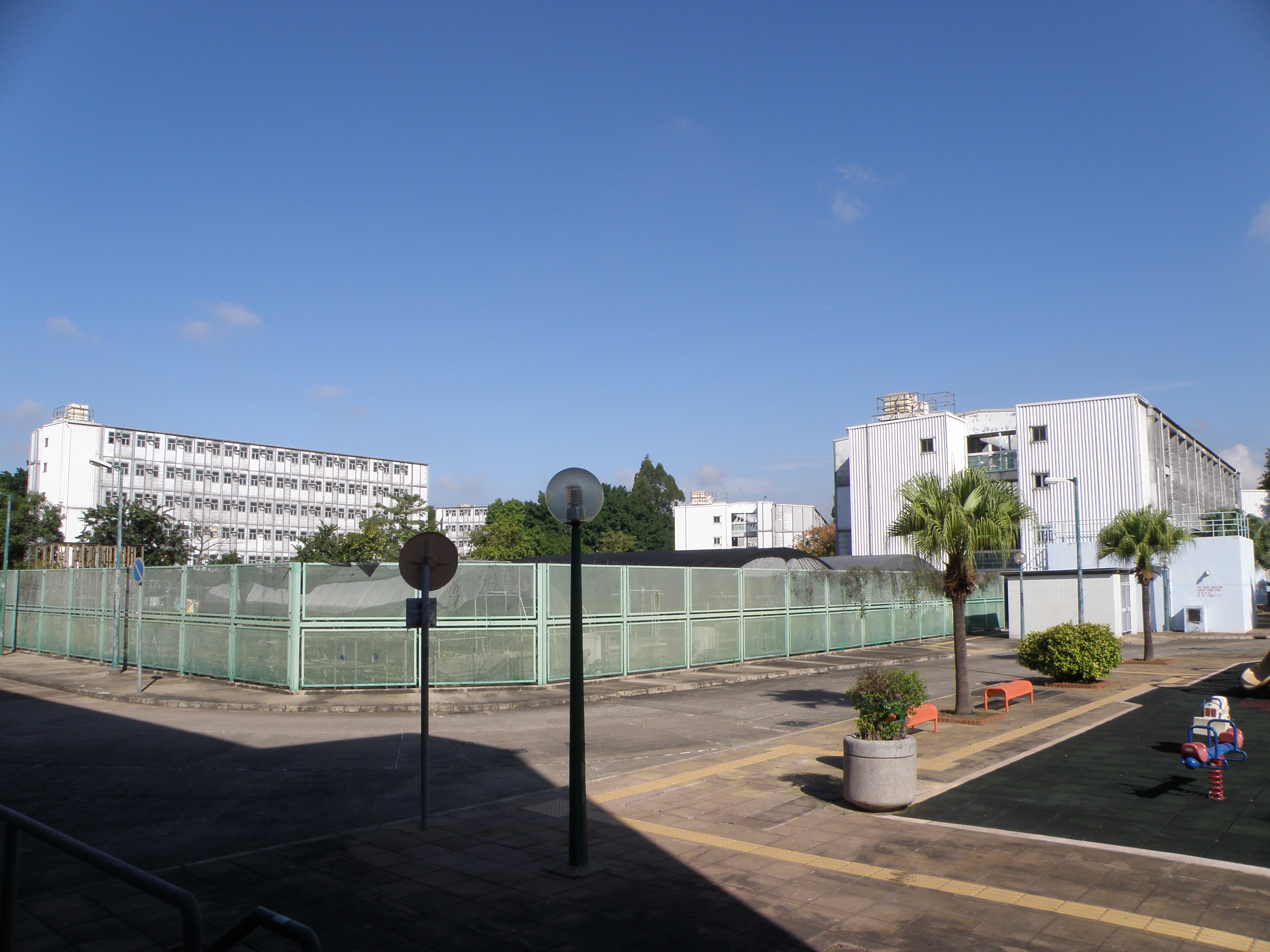
Long Bin Interim Housing

Long Bin Interim Housing (Chinese: 朗邊中轉房屋) is an Interim Housing estate in Castle Peak Road, Ping Shan, Yuen Long. It had eight residential blocks completed in 1999. Unlike public housing estates, it was used to accommodate affected families who are not immediately eligible for allocation of public rental housing. The estate was then demolished between 2016 and 2017 for development of public estates.

Long Bin Interim Housing is in Primary One Admission (POA) School Net 72. Within the school net are multiple aided schools (operated independently but funded with government money) and one government school: Tin Shui Wai Government Primary School (天水圍官立小學).

== Wang Fu Court ==
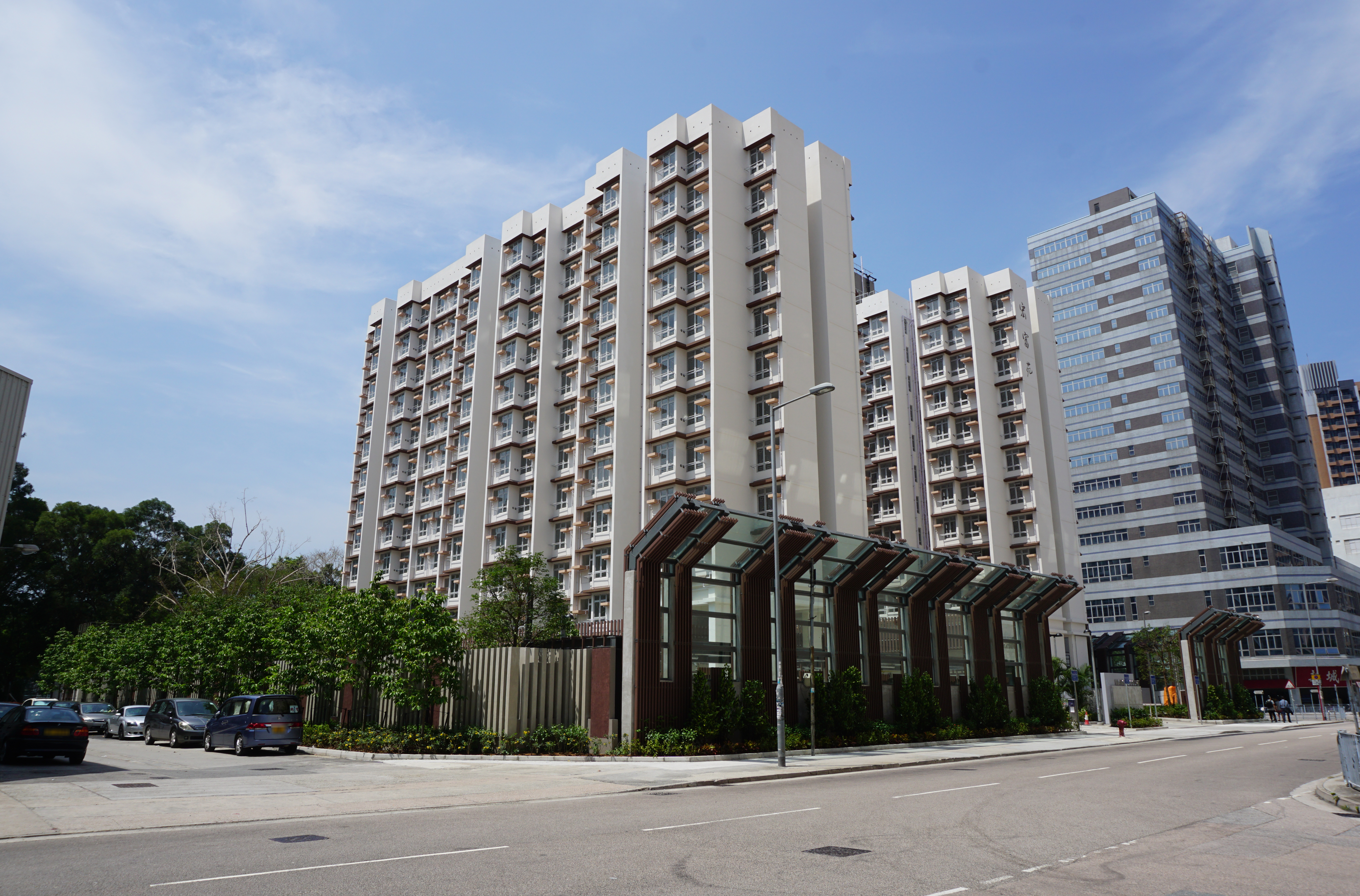
Wang Fu Court

Wang Fu Court (Chinese: 宏富苑) is a Home Ownership Scheme estate completed in 2017. It comprises a single residential block in the Tung Tau Industrial Area, next to the Yuen Long Nullah.

== See also ==
- Public housing in Hong Kong
- Public housing estates in Tin Shui Wai
- List of public housing estates in Hong Kong
