= Long Shin Estate =

Public housing estate in Au Tau, Hong Kong

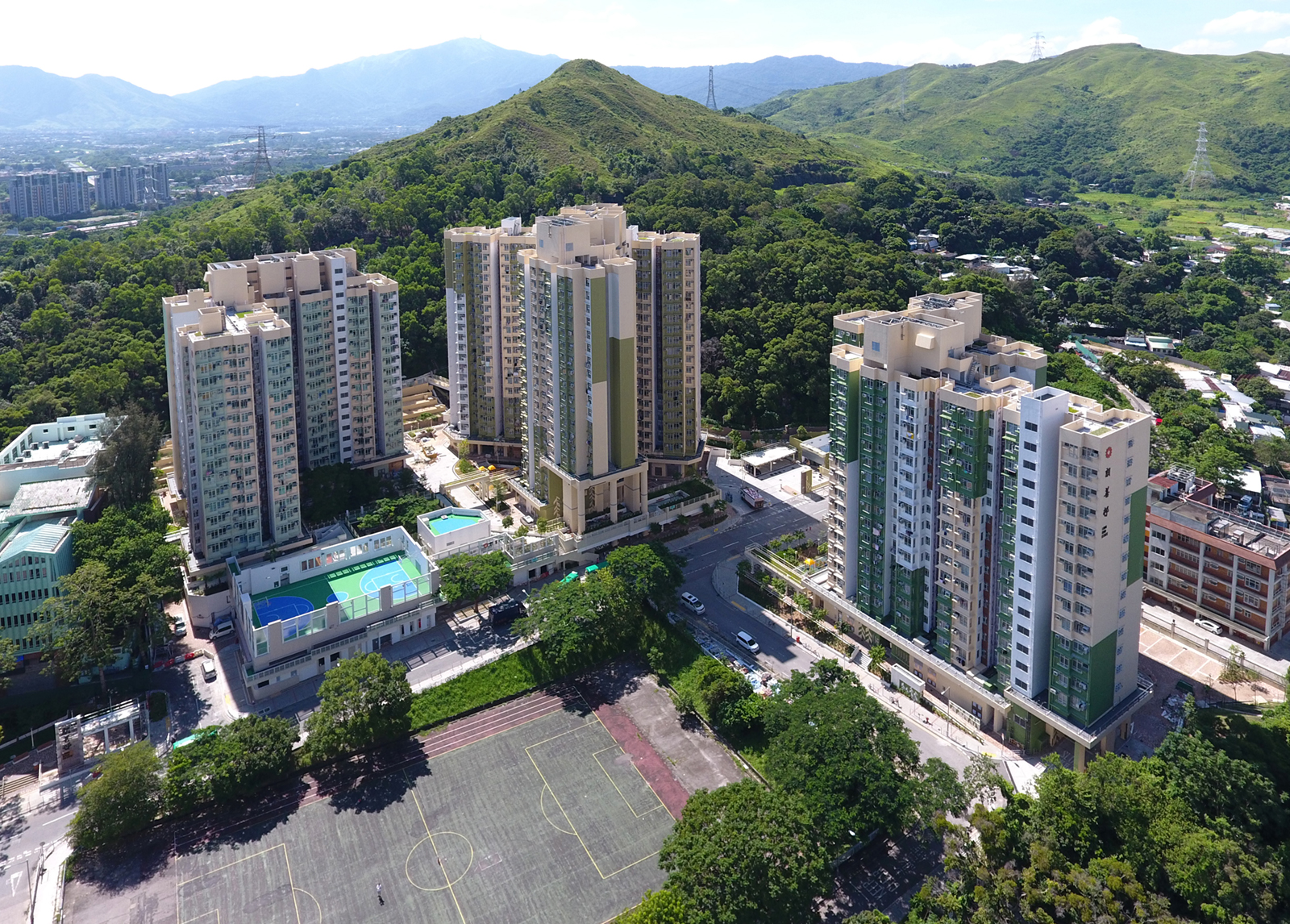
- Long Shin Estate
- Interactive map of Long Shin Estate

General information
- Location: 11-12 Yau Shin Street, Au Tau; Yuen Long; New Territories, Hong Kong
- Coordinates: 22.442106°N 114.045103°E
- Status: Completed
- Category: Public rental housing
- No. of blocks: 3
- No. of units: 1,203

Construction
- Constructed: 2017; 9 years ago
- Authority: Hong Kong Housing Authority

Long Shin Estate (Chinese: 朗善邨) is a public housing estate in Au Tau, Yuen Long, New Territories, Hong Kong, near TWGHs C.Y. Ma Memorial College and Yuen Long Government Primary School. It consists of three residential blocks completed in 2017.

== Houses ==
| Name | Chinese name | Building type | Completed |
|---|---|---|---|
| Shin Leung House | 善良樓 | Non-standard | 2017 |
| Shin Oi House | 善愛樓 | Non-standard | 2017 |
| Shin Yung House | 善勇樓 | Non-standard | 2017 |

== Politics ==
Long Shin Estate is located in Shap Pat Heung East constituency of the Yuen Long District Council. It was formerly represented by Lee Chun-wai, who was elected in the 2019 elections until July 2021.

== See also ==
- Public housing estates in Yuen Long
