= Long Ping =

Long Ping may refer to:

- Long Ping Estate, a public housing estate in Yuen Long, Hong Kong
- Long Ping station, an MTR rapid transit station adjacent to the estate
