= UNOC =

UNOC may refer to any of the following:

- United Nations Operation in the Congo, a United Nations peacekeeping force in Congo in the 1960s
- United Nations Ocean Conference, a United Nations conference dedicated to conservation of the oceans
- Uganda National Oil Company, Uganda's state-owned oil company.

== See also ==
- UOCN, Union of Chinese Nationalists, an unofficial Chinese political party
- UNCO, University of Northern Colorado, in Greeley, Colorado, USA
