= 2003 Yuen Long District Council election =

Hong Kong local election

- 23 November 2003

29 (of the 42) seats to Yuen Long District Council 22 seats needed for a majority
- Turnout: 44.7%
	First party	Second party	Third party
Party	DAB	Democratic Alliance	Democratic
Last election	7 seats, 18.1%	New party	1 seat, 10.4%
Seats before	6	2	1
Seats won	4	4	2
Seat change	▼2	▲2	▲1
Popular vote	9,865	6,928	2,800
Percentage	15.2%	10.7%	4.3%
Swing	▲2.9%	N/A	▼6.1%
	Fourth party	Fifth party
Party	Liberal	HKPA
Last election	0 seat, 1.5%	Did not contest
Seats before	0	1
Seats won	1	1
Seat change	▲1	Steady
Popular vote	2,309	415
Percentage	3.6%	0.6%
Swing	▲2.1%	N/A
- Colours on map indicate winning party for each constituency.

The 2003 Yuen Long District Council election was held on 23 November 2003 to elect all 29 elected members to the 42-member District Council.

== Overall election results ==
Before election:

↓
3	20
PD	Pro-Beijing

Change in composition:

↓
7	22
Pro-dem	Pro-Beijing

Yuen Long District Council election result 2003
Party	Seats	Gains	Losses	Net gain/loss	Seats %	Votes %	Votes	+/−
Independent	20	5	1	+4	69.0	73.9	42,401	
DAB	4	1	3	−2	13.8	15.2	9,865	+2.9
Democratic Alliance	4	2	0	+2	13.8	10.7	6,928	
Democratic	2	1	0	+1	6.9	4.3	2,800	−6.1
Liberal	1	1	0	+1	3.4	3.6	2,309	
HKPA	1	0	0	0	3.4	0.6	415	
