= Shap Pat Heung West (constituency) =

Hong Kong constituency

- Elected constituency for the Yuen Long District Council
- Boundary of Shap Pat Heung West in Yuen Long District
- District: Yuen Long
- Legislative Council constituency: New Territories North West
- Population: 19,402 (2019)
- Electorate: 10,139 (2019)

Current constituency
- Created: 2015
- Number of members: One
- Member: Vacant
- Created from: Shap Pat Heung South

Shap Pat Heung West (Chinese: 十八鄉西) is one of the 31 constituencies in the Yuen Long District of Hong Kong.

The constituency returns one district councillor to the Yuen Long District Council, with an election every four years. Shap Pat Heung West is loosely based on western part of Shap Pat Heung with estimated population of 19,402.

== Councillors represented ==
Election	Member	Party
2015	Ching Chan-ming	Nonpartisan
2019 by-election	Leung Fuk-yuen	Nonpartisan
2019	Szeto Pok-man→Vacant (Note: Resigned on 31 May 2021 over new oath-taking laws.)	Action 18

== Election results ==
=== 2010s ===
Yuen Long District Council Election, 2019: Shap Pat Heung West
Party	Candidate	Votes	%	±%
Action 18 (PfD)	Szeto Pok-man	3,391	49.76	
Nonpartisan	Leung Fuk-yuen	3,080	45.19	
Nonpartisan	Chan Yau-hung	344	5.05	
Majority		311	4.57	
Turnout		6,833	67.46	
Action 18 gain from Nonpartisan		Swing		

Shap Pat Heung West by-election, 2019
Party	Candidate	Votes	%	±%
Nonpartisan	Leung Fuk-yuen	Unopposed		
Nonpartisan gain from Nonpartisan		Swing		

Yuen Long District Council Election, 2015: Shap Pat Heung West
Party	Candidate	Votes	%	±%
Nonpartisan	Ching Chan-ming	Unopposed		
Nonpartisan win (new seat)				
