= Shap Pat Heung Central (constituency) =

Hong Kong constituency

- Elected constituency for the Yuen Long District Council
- Boundary of Shap Pat Heung Central in Yuen Long District
- District: Yuen Long
- Legislative Council constituency: New Territories North West
- Population: 20,582 (2019)
- Electorate: 9,047 (2019)

Current constituency
- Created: 2015
- Number of members: One
- Member: Vacant
- Created from: Fung Nin; Shap Pat Heung North; Shap Pat Heung South

Shap Pat Heung Central is one of the 39 constituencies in the Yuen Long District of Hong Kong.

The constituency returns one district councillor to the Yuen Long District Council, with an election every four years.

Shap Pat Heung Central constituency is loosely based on central part of Shap Pat Heung with estimated population of 20,582.

== Councillors represented ==
Election	Member	Party
2015	Leung Ming-kin	Nonpartisan
2019	Willis Fong Ho-hin→Vacant	Action 18

== Election results ==
=== 2010s ===
Yuen Long District Council Election, 2019: Shap Pat Heung Central
Party	Candidate	Votes	%	±%
Action 18	Willis Fong Ho-hin	4,013	60.57	
Nonpartisan	Leung Ming-kin	2,473	37.33	
Nonpartisan	Chow Yip-ming	139	2.10	
Majority		1,540	23.24	
Turnout		6,646	73.50	
Action 18 gain from Nonpartisan		Swing		

Yuen Long District Council Election, 2015: Shap Pat Heung Central
Party	Candidate	Votes	%	±%
Nonpartisan	Leung Ming-kin	Uncontested		
Nonpartisan win (new seat)				
