= Pek Long (constituency) =

Hong Kong constituency

- Elected constituency for the Yuen Long District Council
- Boundary of Pek Long in Yuen Long District
- District: Yuen Long
- Legislative Council constituency: New Territories North West
- Population: 13,849 (2019)
- Electorate: 10,395 (2019)

Current constituency
- Created: 1994
- Number of members: One
- Member: Vacant

Pek Long is one of the 39 constituencies in the Yuen Long District of Hong Kong.

The constituency returns one district councillor to the Yuen Long District Council, with an election every four years.

Pek Long constituency is loosely based on northern part of Long Ping Estate with estimated population of 13,849.

== Councillors represented ==
Election	Member	Party
1994	Chan Siu-kay	Nonpartisan
1999	Chan Siu-kay	DAB
2007	Kwong Chun-yu→Vacant (Note: Disqualified on 21 October 2021 after his oath was invalid due to his involvement in pro-democracy primaries.)	Democratic

== Election results ==
=== 2010s ===
Yuen Long District Council Election, 2019: Pek Long
Party	Candidate	Votes	%	±%
Democratic	Kwong Chun-yu	4,382	62.91	+4.01
DAB	August Tam Wai-lam	2,584	37.09	−4.01
Majority		1,798	25.82	
Turnout		6,998	67.39	
Democratic hold		Swing		

Yuen Long District Council Election, 2015: Pek Long
Party	Candidate	Votes	%	±%
Democratic	Kwong Chun-yu	2,890	58.9	–7.3
DAB	Wong Yuk-chun	2,013	41.1	+7.3
Majority		877	17.8	–14.6
Turnout		4,953	50.0	
Democratic hold		Swing	–7.3	

Yuen Long District Council Election, 2011: Pek Long
Party	Candidate	Votes	%	±%
Democratic	Kwong Chun-yu	2,554	66.2	+7.6
DAB	Chan Chi-wai	1,302	33.8	–7.6
Majority		1,252	32.4	+15.2
Democratic hold		Swing	+7.6	

=== 2000s ===
Yuen Long District Council Election, 2007: Pek Long
Party	Candidate	Votes	%	±%
Democratic	Kwong Chun-yu	1,960	58.6	
DAB	Chan Siu-kay	1,383	41.4	
Majority		577	17.2	
Democratic gain from DAB		Swing		

Yuen Long District Council Election, 2003: Pek Long
Party	Candidate	Votes	%	±%
DAB	Chan Siu-kay	uncontested		
DAB hold		Swing		

=== 1990s ===
Yuen Long District Council Election, 1999: Pek Long
Party	Candidate	Votes	%	±%
DAB	Chan Siu-kay	uncontested		
DAB hold		Swing		

Yuen Long District Board Election, 1994: Pek Long
Party	Candidate	Votes	%	±%
Nonpartisan	Chan Siu-kay	2,269	79.4	
Nonpartisan	Wong Chi-fai	525	18.4	
Nonpartisan	Wong Yin-ping	43	1.5	
Majority		1,744	61.0	
Nonpartisan win (new seat)				
