= Pro-ROC camp =

Political faction in Hong Kong

Pro-ROC camp 親中華民國派
- Flags of the Republic of China and the Kuomintang
- Ideology: Conservatism (HK); Chinese nationalism; Anti-communism (HK); Three Principles of the People
- Political position: Centre-right to right-wing
- Regional affiliation: Pro-democracy camp Pan-Blue Coalition
- Legislative Council: 0 / 90
- District Councils: 0 / 470

The pro-Republic of China camp (Chinese: 親中華民國派 or 民國派), or the pro-Kuomintang camp (親國民黨派), is a political alignment in Hong Kong. It generally pledges allegiance to the Republic of China (ROC) in Taiwan and the Kuomintang (Chinese Nationalist Party).

The pro-ROC camp were called "Rightists" and was one of the two major political forces in Hong Kong during the first decades of the post-war period of the British colony of Hong Kong. The pro-ROC camp, who competed with the pro-Communist ("Leftists"), has gradually declined in numbers after the Republic of China's departure from the United Nations in 1971 and the signing of the Sino-British Joint Declaration in 1984 which decided Hong Kong's sovereignty to be handed over to the People's Republic of China (PRC). Today, it is generally aligned with the pro-democracy camp in Hong Kong and the Pan-Blue Coalition in Taiwan led by the Kuomintang.

The pro-ROC camp closely follows the Kuomintang's doctrines, including Sun Yat-sen's Three Principles of the People and the 1992 Consensus of Cross-strait relations. It opposes Taiwan independence and also supports universal suffrage in Hong Kong. The only elected representatives of the pro-ROC camp in the post-handover era are from the Democratic Alliance, of which party chairman Johnny Mak and Shek King-ching occupied seats in the Yuen Long District Council until 2021.

== History ==
=== Pre-war period ===
The support base of the Kuomintang has existed even before the founding of the Republic of China (ROC), as its founding father Sun Yat-sen was a medical student in British Hong Kong in the late 19th century and set up anti-Qing revolutionary organisations in Hong Kong. After the founding of the Republic, Hong Kong pro-Nationalist forces remained their close contact with the Nationalist revolutionary government in Canton. With the Canton's support, the pro-Nationalists and pro-Communists launched the 1922 Hong Kong Seamens' Strike and 1925 Canton–Hong Kong General Strike. In 1927, the pro-Nationalists gained their status as the Nationalist Party became the official government in China until 1949.

=== Early post-war period ===
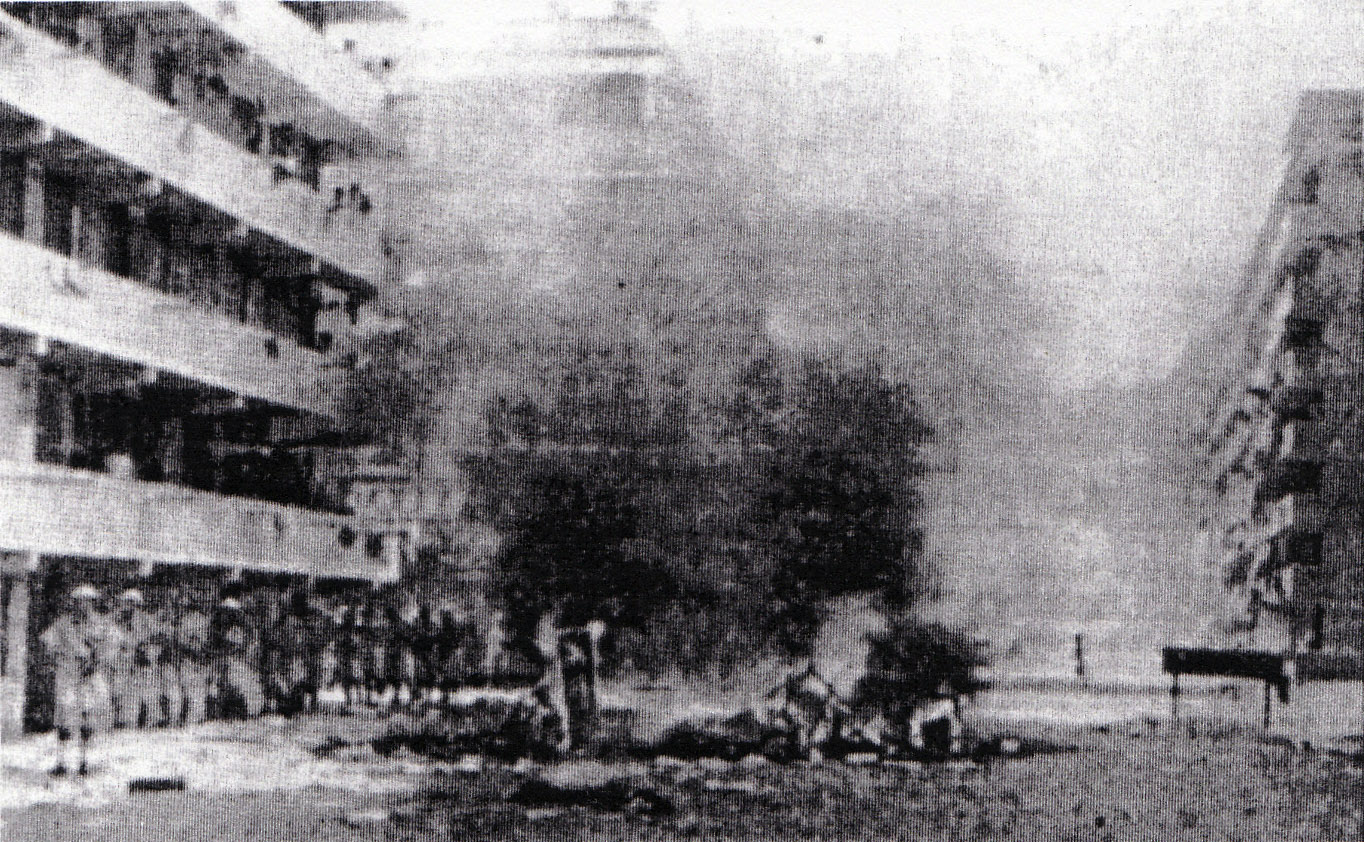
Double Ten riots of 1956 was started by the pro-Nationalist triad members.

The Chinese Civil War saw the influx of pro-Kuomintang refugees and former soldiers to Hong Kong who were driven from their homeland by the Communists, and they first settled at refugee centers in Kai Lung Wan. After years of exile and grinding poverty, many of them were steeped in bitterness and yearning for revenge against the Communists. The pro-Kuomintang triad members played a key part in the Double Ten riots, which was escalated from provocations between pro-Nationalist and pro-Communist factions in 1956. A government official ordered that Republic of China flags be removed from the Lei Cheng Uk estate, eventually leading to the riots. After the riots ended, the colonial government decided to move the Nationalists to a more remote spot. This became the most iconic pro-Nationalist neighbourhood Rennie's Mill, which was a Nationalist enclave in the colony until it was redeveloped into the Tseung Kwan O New Town in the 1990s on the eve of the handover of Hong Kong.

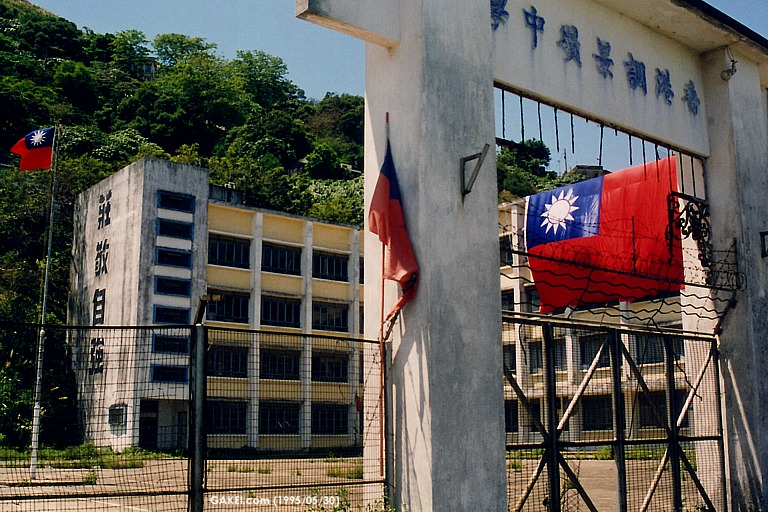
Rennie's Mill Middle School in 1995 flying the flag of the Republic of China.

The KMT also subsidized schools in Hong Kong via the Overseas Chinese Affairs Commission, such as the Hong Kong Tak Ming College and Chu Hai College of Higher Education. The British government in Hong Kong did not recognize Chu Hai College's accreditation, so it was instead registered under the Republic of China's Ministry of Education, giving it recognition as if the school were located in Taiwan.

Some Hong Kong newspapers advertised joining the KMT military, and a number of Hong Kong residents signed up and defended Kinmen Island in 1958. Some of these members returned to Hong Kong and joined the Republic of China Veterans' Association, where they gathered at the Red House every National Day.

The political scene in Hong Kong was split into pro-Nationalist and pro-Communist factions in the first decades of the post-war Hong Kong, of which both camps controlled various sectors from labour unions, schools, media to film companies. The largest pro-Nationalist trade unions was the Hong Kong and Kowloon Trades Union Council (TUC) established in 1948, which was the main rival of the pro-Communist Hong Kong and Kowloon Federation of Trade Unions (FTU). The pro-Nationalist forces also owned the Hong Kong Times which was founded in 1949 with an anti-communist stance and was regarded as a Kuomintang party organ. Many major newspapers at that time were also generally pro-Nationalist, such as the Kung Sheung Daily News, Wah Kiu Yat Pao and the Sing Tao Daily which used the Minguo calendar until the 1980s or 90s.

=== Long decline ===
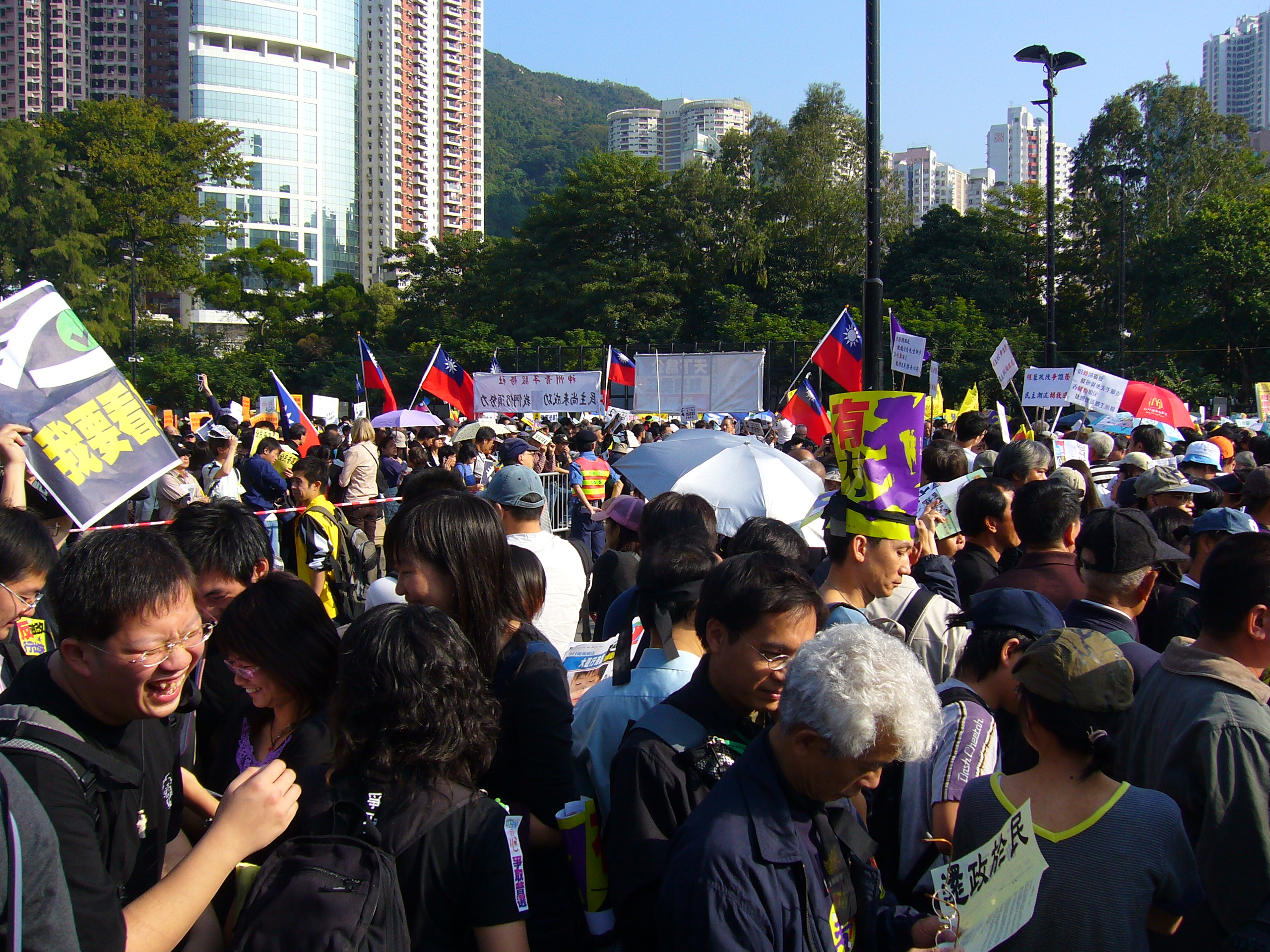
Pro-ROC supporters holding the flag of the Republic of China during the pro-democracy protest in December 2005.

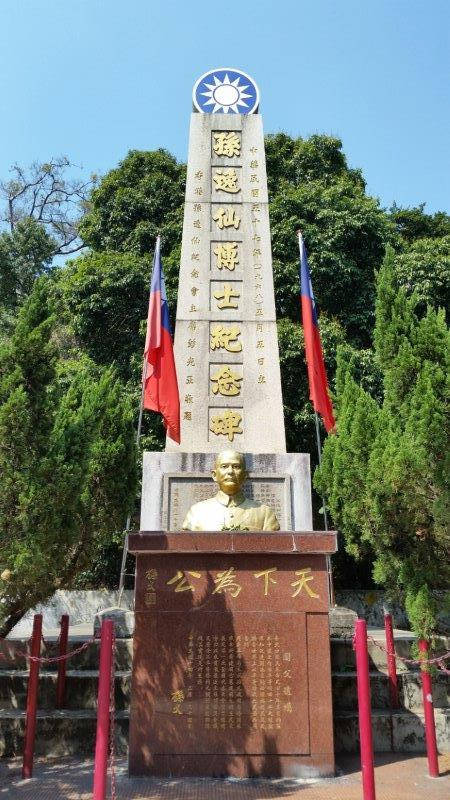
Obelisk at Sun Yat Sen Commemorative Garden, Tuen Mun

After the Republic of China's departure from the United Nations, the Taipei government lost a great prestige in the Chinese community. The pro-Kuomintang forces also suffered a decline. The signing of the Sino-British Joint Declaration in 1984, which decided Hong Kong's sovereignty to be handed over to the People's Republic of China (PRC), also resulted in diminished numbers of the pro-Taiwan forces. In the 1990s, it saw the two pro-Kuomintang newspapers Hong Kong Times and Hong Kong United Daily closed. The right-leaning Sing Tao Daily also could not be classified as a rightist paper anymore after a political metamorphosis.

The pro-Kuomintang camp also tried to participate in the elections as the colonial government introduced representative democracy in the 1980s but could hardly launch an effective campaign. In 1985, it saw the TUC representative Pang Chun-hoi occupy a seat in the Labour functional constituency along with FTU representative Tam Yiu-chung in the first elected Legislative Council of Hong Kong. Pang was generally aligned with the liberal cause in the legislature and served for three terms until he stepped down in 1995.

In 1994, the pro-Nationalists founded a political party 123 Democratic Alliance to contest in the 1995 first full Legislative Council election. Yum Sin-ling, the leader of the alliance won a seat through an Election Committee composing of District Board members in the last colonial Legislative Council on the eve of the handover.

Since 1997, the pro-ROC camp has become a small faction within the pro-democracy camp. The Democratic Alliance led by Johnny Mak was founded in 2003 and cooperated with pro-democrat legislator Albert Chan in the 2003 District Council election. It was briefly affiliated with the radical democratic party People Power between 2011 and 2012. The other currently active pro-Taiwan political groups include the China Youth Service & Recreation Centre and Hong Kong Chung Shan Research Institute, the local KMT branch. The Hong Kong Chung Shan Research Institute as of 2021 numbers around 2000 members and is run entirely by local cadres.

== Political and labour organisations ==
- Hong Kong and Kowloon Trades Union Council (TUC), the third-largest trade union in Hong Kong chaired by Lee Kwok-keung. It previously held one of two seats of the Labour functional constituency from 1985 to 1995.
- China Youth Service & Recreation Center
- Hong Kong Chung Shan Research Institute (港澳中山文教研究總會), de facto Kuomintang Branch in Hong Kong and Macau.

=== Former political party ===
- 123 Democratic Alliance (dissolved)
- Democratic Alliance (dissolved) was a small political party chaired by Johnny Mak. It aligned itself with the pro-democracy camp and held two seats on the Yuen Long District Council until 2021. It was the only party of the camp to have elected members since the handover.

=== Former media ===
- Hong Kong Times (closed)
- Hong Kong United Daily (closed)
- Kung Sheung Daily News (closed)
- Sing Tao Daily (switched side to pro-Beijing camp after the 1997 handover of Hong Kong)
- Wah Kiu Yat Po (closed)

== Notable politicians ==
These Hong Kong politicians were also members of the Kuomintang.

- Pang Chun-hoi, former member of the Legislative Council of Hong Kong and vice-president of TUC
- Wong Yuk-man, former member of the Legislative Council of Hong Kong and chairman of the League of Social Democrats
- Johnny Mak, former member of the Yuen Long District Council and chairman of 123 Democratic Alliance
- Wong Kwok-yi (王國儀), former member of the Sai Kung District Council
- Lam Chun-ka (林俊嘉), member of the Sai Kung District Council and member of the pro-Beijing Liberal Party

== See also ==
- Hong Kong–Taiwan relations
- Anti-People's Republic of China
- Pan-Blue Coalition
