= 1999 Yuen Long District Council election =

Hong Kong local election

- 28 November 1999

23 (of the 32) seats to Yuen Long District Council 22 seats needed for a majority
- Turnout: 40.8%
	First party	Second party	Third party
Party	DAB	Democratic	123DA
Last election	1 seat, 8.8%	3 seats, 14.8%	0 seat, 2.9%
Seats before	5	2	1
Seats won	7	1	1
Seat change	▲2	▼1	Steady
Popular vote	8,144	4,644	2,706
Percentage	18.1%	10.4%	6.0%
Swing	▲9.3%	▼6.1%	N/A
- Colours on map indicate winning party for each constituency.

The 1999 Yuen Long District Council election was held in Hong Kong on 28 November 1999 to elect all 23 elected members to the 36-member District Council.

== Overall election results ==
Before election:

↓
3	16
PD	Pro-Beijing

Change in composition:

↓
3	20
PD	Pro-Beijing

Yuen Long District Council election result 1999
Party	Seats	Gains	Losses	Net gain/loss	Seats %	Votes %	Votes	+/−
Independent	14	4	1	+3	60.9	64.0	28,711	
DAB	7	2	0	+2	30.4	18.1	8,144	+9.3
Democratic	1	0	1	−1	6.9	10.4	4,644	−6.1
123DA	1	0	0	0	4.3	6.0	2,706	
