= 2011 Yuen Long District Council election =

Hong Kong local election

- 6 November 2011

31 (of the 42) seats to Yuen Long District Council 22 seats needed for a majority
- Turnout: 39.6%
	First party	Second party	Third party
Party	DAB	Democratic	Liberal
Last election	7 seats, 21.9%	2 seats, 8.1%	3 seats, 12.6%
Seats before	7	2	1
Seats won	7	3	2
Seat change	Steady	▲1	▲1
Popular vote	11,782	8,405	3,923
Percentage	15.7%	11.2%	5.2%
Swing	▼6.2%	▲3.1%	▼7.4%
	Fourth party	Fifth party	Sixth party
Party	FTU	People Power	NTAS
Last election	Did not run	New party	Did not run
Seats before	0	1	0
Seats won	2	1	1
Seat change	▲2	Steady	▲1
Popular vote	3,686	4,460	2,187
Percentage	4.9%	6.0%	2.9%
Swing	N/A	N/A	N/A
	Seventh party
Party	NPP
Last election	New party
Seats before	0
Seats won	1
Seat change	▲1
Popular vote	1,032
Percentage	1.4%
Swing	N/A
- Colours on map indicate winning party for each constituency.

The 2011 Yuen Long District Council election was held on 6 November 2011 to elect all 31 elected members to the 42-member District Council.

== Overall election results ==
Before election:

↓
4	1	24
PD	V.	Pro-Beijing

Change in composition:

↓
5	26
PD	Pro-Beijing

Yuen Long District Council election result 2011
Party	Seats	Gains	Losses	Net gain/loss	Seats %	Votes %	Votes	+/−
Independent	14	2	5	−3	45.2	43.9	32,909	
DAB	7	0	0	0	22.6	15.7	11,782	−6.2
Democratic	3	1	0	+1	9.7	11.2	8,405	+3.1
People Power	1	0	0	0	3.2	6.0	4,460	
Liberal	2	1	0	+1	6.5	5.2	3,923	−7.4
FTU	2	2	0	+2	6.5	4.9	3,686	
CTU	0	0	0	0	0	3.4	2,566	+2.5
NTAS	1	1	0	+1	3.2	2.9	2,187	
Land Justice League	0	0	0	0	0	2.4	1,826	
NPP	1	1	0	+1	3.2	1.4	1,032	
NWSC	0	0	0	0	0	1.9	1,443	
Civic	0	0	0	0	0	0.9	666	
