= Roy Kwong =

Hong Kong politician

Kwong Chun-yu
- 鄺俊宇
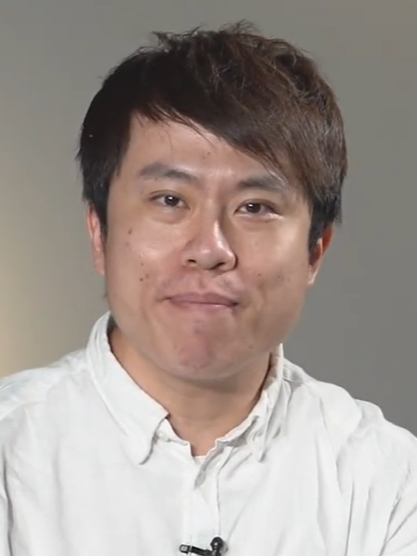

Member of the Legislative Council
- In office 1 October 2016 – 1 December 2020
- Preceded by: Albert Ho
- Succeeded by: Constituency abolished
- Constituency: District Council (Second)

Member of the Yuen Long District Council
- In office 1 January 2008 – 21 October 2021
- Preceded by: Chan Siu-kay
- Constituency: Pek Long

Personal details
- Born: 9 February 1983 (age 43) British Hong Kong
- Party: Democratic Party
- Occupation: District Councillor
- Profession: Social worker

Roy Kwong Chun-yu (Chinese: 鄺俊宇; born 9 February 1983) is a Hong Kong politician and novelist. He is a member of the Democratic Party and former member of the Yuen Long District Council for Pek Long. He became a member of the Legislative Council of Hong Kong in 2016 through the District Council (Second) "super seat". Kwong resigned along with 14 other remaining pro-democracy legislators from the Legislative Council on 11 November 2020, after the central government had unseated four of pro-democracy legislators the same day.

== Biography ==
Prior to entering politics, Kwong worked in a youth centre in Long Ping Estate, Yuen Long. In 2004 he became a community officer for Democratic Party's Yuen Long District Councillor Zachary Wong and subsequently joined the party.

=== Political career ===
In the 2007 District Council elections, 24-year-old Kwong ran in Pek Long of the Yuen Long District Council, defeating a veteran pro-Beijing Democratic Alliance for the Betterment and Progress of Hong Kong (DAB) incumbent Chan Siu-kay. He went on to be re-elected in 2011, 2015, and 2019.

As a 25-year-old, Kwong became the youngest candidate in the 2008 Legislative Council election, running in New Territories West with Cheung Yin-tung but was not elected. In the 2012 Legislative Council election, he ran with party chairman Albert Ho in the territory-wide District Council (Second) “super seat” and successfully helped Ho to be elected.

In the 2016 Legislative Council election, he became a member of the Legislative Council of Hong Kong through the District Council (Second) "super seat" with veteran James To in which he won nearly 500,000 votes, the largest votes ever to be received by a ticket. He was once considered as a marginal candidate in the election according to the election poll. However, the weaker pro-democracy candidates from Civic Party, Neo Democrats and ADPL openly suspended their election campaign in order to secure the third super seat of the pro-democracy camp. Besides, he was recommended by Benny Tai's ThunderGo plan. As a result, Kwong was elected with a record-breaking number of popular votes.

During the 2019–20 Hong Kong protests, Kwong was often seen chanting protest slogans and calling on protesters and police alike to remain calm.

On the morning of 24 September 2019, Kwong was assaulted near his Tin Shui Wai home. Three people pulled him from his car and began punching and kicking him, with one of them filming the attack. He was subsequently taken to Tin Shui Wai Hospital with injuries to his cervical vertebrae, as he was kicked in the back of the neck. The Democratic Party condemned the incident, alleging it to be an organised attack intended to intimidate supporters of the protest movement. Yuen Long district councillor Zachary Wong claimed that both he and Kwong had received threatening letters a month prior. The Hong Kong government condemned the attack and said the police would investigate.

On 11 November 2020, Kwong resigned from the Legislative Council together with 14 remaining pro-democratic legislators in protest over the unseating of four pro-democratic legislators through a ruling by the central government on the same day.

On 6 January 2021, Kwong was among 53 members of the pro-democratic camp who were arrested under the national security law, specifically its provision regarding alleged subversion. The group stood accused of the organisation of and participation in unofficial primary elections held by the camp in July 2020. Kwong was released on bail on 7 January.

On 21 October 2021, Kwong was disqualified along with 15 other district councillors (with a further one having resigned before disqualification) for his invalid oath-taking after he was involved with participating in the last year pro-democracy primaries.

=== Writing career ===
Kwong is also a romantic fiction writer. He published his successful debut book Love You Like the First Time We Met in 2014. His second book, There is a Kind of Happiness Called Forgetting, sold more than 10,000 copies at the annual Hong Kong Book Fair in the same year. He also drew attention online after he published a short love essay entitled "The Last Time You Were On WhatsApp" on the internet in 2012. Kwong had attracted over 92,000 "likes" on Facebook since the essay. Up to 2015, he has published seven romantic novels. His peculiar writing style is imitated and called “Kwong-style”.

Political offices
Preceded by Chan Siu-kay	Member of Yuen Long District Council; Representative for Pek Long; 2008–2021	Vacant
Legislative Council of Hong Kong
Preceded by Albert Ho	Member of Legislative Council; Representative for District Council (Second); 2016–2020	Constituency abolished
