= Anti-communism in China =

Anti-communism
- Traditional Chinese: 反共主義
- Simplified Chinese: 反共主义
Transcriptions
Standard Mandarin
- Hanyu Pinyin: fǎn gòng zhǔyì
- Bopomofo: ㄈㄢˇ ㄍㄨㄥˋ ㄓㄨˇ ㄧˋ
- Wade–Giles: fan^{3} kung^{4} chu^{3}-i^{4}

Anti-communism in China has a long history. Before the Chinese Communist Revolution, anti-communist policies were implemented by the Kuomintang (KMT) and conservative warlords. Today, anti-communism in mainland China and among overseas Chinese is sometimes associated with protest movements and support for liberal democracy.

== History ==
=== Republic of China (1925–1949) ===
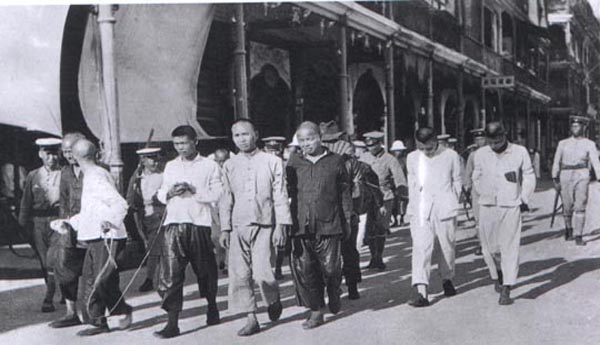
Chinese Kuomintang troops rounding up communist prisoners for execution in Shanghai

Before the founding of the People's Republic of China, the Kuomintang, also known as the Chinese Nationalist Party, led by Chiang Kai-shek, was ruling China and strongly opposed the Chinese Communist Party (CCP). On 12 April 1927, Chiang Kai-shek purged the communists in what was known as the Shanghai massacre which led to the Chinese Civil War. The Kuomintang received support from fascist organizations within China such as the Blue Shirts Society, as well as external support from powers like Nazi Germany, which aided the Kuomintang heavily. The New Life Movement pushed by the Kuomintang was in opposition to the Communist movement, and had fascist tendencies. Initially, the Kuomintang had success in suppressing the CCP until a full-scale invasion of China by Japan forced both the Nationalists and the CCP into an alliance.

To suppress CCP activities, Chiang's spymaster Dai Li employed extrajudicial means including assassination, arbitrary arrests, and torture, with Chiang's explicit or tacit approval.

On 28 February 1947 the Kuomintang had cracked down on a Taiwanese anti-government uprising involving some communists, a former Qing province-turned-Japanese colony ruled from 1895 to 1945, known as the February 28 incident and the government began the White Terror in Taiwan to purge the communist spies to prevent Chinese communist subversion. On July 15, 1947, Document 0744 ordered the CCP and its People's Liberation Army to be called "Communist bandits". After the war, the two parties were thrown back into a civil war. The Kuomintang were defeated in the mainland and retreated to Taiwan while the rest of mainland China became Communist in 1949.

=== People's Republic of China ===
Democracy movements have been loosely organized in the People's Republic of China. The movement began during the Beijing Spring in 1978 and it also played an important role in the 1989 Tiananmen Square protests and massacre. The 1959 Tibetan uprising had some anti-communist leanings.

Charter 08 is a manifesto which was signed by over 303 Chinese intellectuals and human rights activists who seek to promote political reform and democratization in the People's Republic of China. It calls for greater freedom of expression and free elections. It was published on 10 December 2008, the 60th anniversary of the adoption of the Universal Declaration of Human Rights. Its name is a reference to Charter 77 which was issued by dissidents in Czechoslovakia. Since its release, the charter has been signed by more than 8,100 people both inside and outside of China.

=== Hong Kong ===
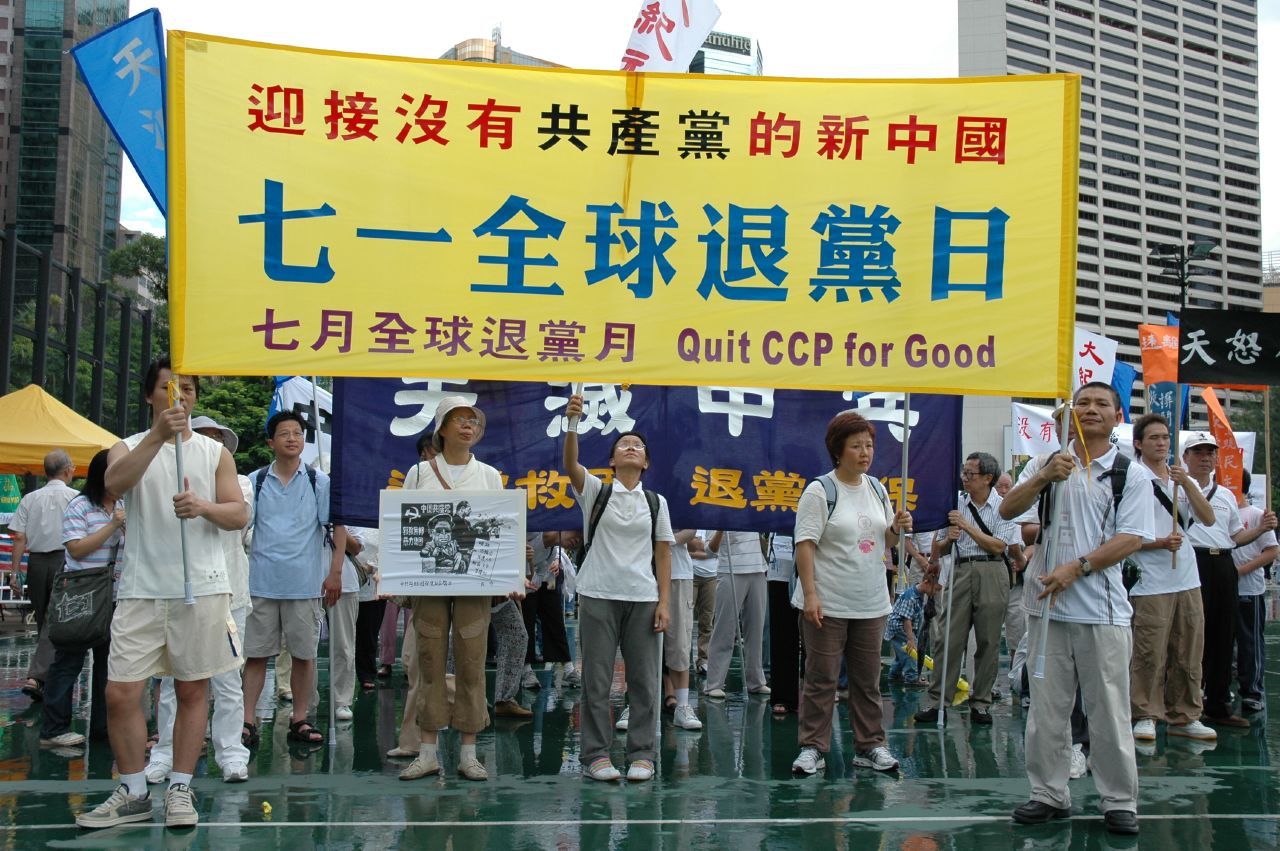
A Falun Gong protest advocating quitting the Chinese Communist Party in Hong Kong, 2005

Before 1997, most of the anti-communists were supporters of the Kuomintang. They opposed the CCP's rule in mainland China and its single party dictatorship.

Hong Kong has had numerous anti-CCP protests, supported by political parties of the pro-democracy camp. Memorials for the 1989 Tiananmen Square protests and massacre have held every year in Hong Kong, but large-scale public commemorations have effectively ceased since the passage of the 2020 Hong Kong national security law. Tens of thousands of people have attended the candlelight vigil.

The end of the failed 2014 Hong Kong protests marked a novel and intensified wave of moderate nationalism in the territory. Localists have fiercely opposed CCP rule since the transfer of sovereignty over Hong Kong in 1997, with some calling for independence from China. This culminated in the 2019–20 Hong Kong protests and the subsequent passing of the Hong Kong national security law, which continued the gradual integration of Hong Kong with mainland China.

=== Taiwan (Republic of China, 1949–present) ===
After the Great Retreat, the Republic of China (Taiwan) government remained anti-communist and attempted to recover the mainland from the Communist forces. During the Cold War, the Republic of China was known as "Free China" or "Nationalist China" while the People's Republic of China on the mainland China was known as "Red China" or "Communist China" in the West, to mark the ideological difference between the capitalist Western Bloc and communist Eastern Bloc. The Republic of China government also actively supported anti-communist efforts in Southeast Asia and around the world. This effort did not cease until the death of Chiang Kai-shek in 1975.

Even though contacts between Kuomintang and CCP had existed since the 1990s to re-establish cross-strait relations, the Kuomintang continues to be nominally opposed to communism, as anti-communism is written under Article 2 of Kuomintang's party charter.

== Anti-communist groups ==
=== Mainland China ===
- Kuomintang (1919–1949)
  - Blue Shirts Society (1932–1938)
  - Western Hills Group (1925–1931)
- Young China Party (1923–1949)
- Democracy Party of China (1998–present, banned)
- Union of Chinese Nationalists (2004–present, banned)

=== Taiwan ===
- Kuomintang – Although relations has improved with the PRC since the 1992 Consensus, Article 2 of the Kuomintang's party charter establishes anti-communism as a central position.
- Young China Party
- Democratic Progressive Party (1986–present)
- Taiwan Statebuilding Party (2016–present)

=== Hong Kong and Macau ===
- Apple Daily (1995–2021)
- Democratic Alliance (2003–2021)
- Hong Kong and Kowloon Trades Union Council (1948–present)

=== Overseas ===
- The Epoch Times (2000–present)
- Shen Yun (2006–present)
- Shanghai National Party (2018–present)

== See also ==
- The Anti-Communist and Anti-Russian Aggression Song
- Anti-communist mass killings#Mainland China
- Anti-People's Republic of China
- Chiangism
- Chinese Civil War
- Conservatism in China
- Conservatism in Hong Kong#Anti-communism
- Dai Jitao Thought
- Falun Gong
- Fascism in Asia
- Hong Kong nationalism
- Huadu (Taiwan)
- Liberalism in China
- Pro–Republic of China sentiment
  - Republican Fever
- Wang Jingwei regime
