= Union of Chinese Nationalists =

Union of Chinese Nationalists 中國泛藍聯盟
- Abbreviation: UOCN
- Chairman: John Wen (文炎)
- Founded: August 8, 2004
- Headquarters: Wuhan, Hubei
- Membership (2010): 5,000
- Ideology: Liberalism (Chinese); Conservatism (Taiwanese); Anti-communism (Chinese); Anti–Taiwan independence; Three Principles of the People
- Political position: Centre-right to right-wing
- National affiliation: Pan-Blue Coalition

Website
- uocn.groupsite.com

The Union of Chinese Nationalists (simplified Chinese: 中国泛蓝联盟; traditional Chinese: 中國泛藍聯盟), sometimes referred to in English as the Chinese Pan-Blue Alliance, or China Pan-Blue Alliance, abbreviated as "UOCN", is an unregistered political group in the People's Republic of China that supports the goals of the Kuomintang and the ideals of the Pan-Blue Coalition in Taiwan. According to the website, it values liberal democracy and the Three Principles of the People, and opposes communism and Taiwan independence. It originated in an internet forum in August 2004.

UOCN is not officially recognized by the PRC government. The actual membership size and level of support for the organization is difficult to gauge because it is actively suppressed in the PRC.

In a news conference held in 2007, Yang Yi, spokesman of PRC's Taiwan Affairs Office, declared the organization to be "unregistered and illegal", and "not being related to the Nationalist Party of China Kuomintang in Taiwan".

== See also ==
- List of political parties in the People's Republic of China
- Weiquan movement
- Political status of Taiwan
- Pro-ROC camp (Hong Kong)
- One Country on Each Side
