= Action 18 =

Political group in Yuen Long, Hong Kong

Action 18 動元十八
- Founded: July 2019
- Ideology: Liberalism (Hong Kong)
- Regional affiliation: Pro-democracy camp
- Colours: Navy
- Legislative Council: 0 / 90
- Yuen Long District Council: 0 / 46

Website
- www.action18.hk

Action 18 (Chinese: 動元十八) is a pro-democracy regional group operating in Yuen Long District, Hong Kong. The party fielded three candidates in the 2019 District Council election and won two seats in the Shap Pat Heung Central and Shap Pat Heung West constituencies.

Willis Fong Ho-hin and Szeto Pok-man, the two elected district councillors, pledged to pay attention to regional planning and public transport issues and organise regular public forums to exchange opinions with local residents. They attributed their success to being outsiders to villages in the area, saying that voters in their constituencies were frustrated by their previous district councillors focusing on village issues, rather than problems with transport links and traffic jams associated with the increasing number of private housing estate developments in southern Yuen Long. In addition, they pledged to fully investigate the 2019 Yuen Long attack, which occurred four months before the district council elections.

The group expanded to three district councillors in February 2020, with Wilber Lee Chun-Wai of Shap Pat Heung East joining the group.

== Performance in elections ==
=== District Council elections ===
| Election | Number of popular votes | % of popular votes | Total elected seats | +/− |
|---|---|---|---|---|
| 2019 | 9,006 | 3.70 | 2 / 39 | 2▲ |
