= Fung Cheung (constituency) =

Hong Kong constituency

- Elected constituency for the Yuen Long District Council
- Boundary of Fung Cheung in Yuen Long District
- District: Yuen Long
- Legislative Council constituency: New Territories North West
- Population: 15,976 (2019)
- Electorate: 8,538 (2019)

Current constituency
- Created: 1994
- Number of members: One
- Member: Vacant

Fung Cheung is one of the 31 constituencies in the Yuen Long District of Hong Kong.

The constituency returns one district councillor to the Yuen Long District Council, with an election every four years. The seat was last held by Democratic Alliance Johnny Mak since its creation in 1994.

Fung Cheung constituency is loosely based on southeastern part of Yuen Long Town, covering Fung Yau Street, Fung Kwan Street, Fung Cheung Road including private residential estates such as Greenfields and Grand Del Sol with estimated population of 15,976.

== Councillors represented ==
Election	Member	Party
1994	Johnny Mak Ip-sing→Vacant (Note: Resigned on 12 July 2021.)	Democratic
1999	Johnny Mak Ip-sing→Vacant	123DA
2003	Johnny Mak Ip-sing→Vacant	YLTSWDA
2011	Johnny Mak Ip-sing→Vacant	People Power
2012	Johnny Mak Ip-sing→Vacant	Democratic Alliance

== Election results ==
=== 2010s ===
Yuen Long District Council Election, 2019: Fung Cheung
Party	Candidate	Votes	%	±%
Democratic Alliance	Mak Ip-sing	3,832	61.02	+3.22
DAB	Chong Chin-ming	2,448	38.98	+1.08
Majority		1,384	22.04	
Turnout		6,292	73.71	
Democratic Alliance hold		Swing		

Yuen Long District Council Election, 2015: Fung Cheung
Party	Candidate	Votes	%	±%
Democratic Alliance	Mak Ip-sing	2,173	57.8	+3.9
DAB	Yu Chung-leung	1,425	37.9	–8.2
Nonpartisan	Wong Wai	163	4.3	
Majority		748	19.9	+12.2
Turnout		3,797	51.6	
Democratic Alliance hold		Swing	+6.1	

Yuen Long District Council Election, 2011: Fung Cheung
Party	Candidate	Votes	%	±%
People Power	Mak Ip-sing	1,845	53.87	+3.41
DAB	Yu Chung-leung	1,580	46.13	+10.34
Majority		265	7.74	–6.92
People Power hold		Swing	–3.47	

=== 2000s ===
Yuen Long District Council Election, 2007: Fung Cheung
Party	Candidate	Votes	%	±%
Democratic Alliance	Mak Ip-sing	1,325	50.46	–25.27
DAB	Yu Chung-leung	940	35.79	+11.22
Liberal	Wong Chun-sing	361	13.75	
Majority		385	14.66	–37.71
Democratic Alliance hold		Swing	–18.25	

Yuen Long District Council Election, 2003: Fung Cheung
Party	Candidate	Votes	%	±%
Democratic Alliance	Mak Ip-sing	2,022	75.73	+6.40
DAB	So Yun-lam	648	24.27	–6.40
Majority		1,374	51.46	+12.80
Democratic Alliance hold		Swing	+6.40	

=== 1990s ===
Yuen Long District Council Election, 1999: Fung Cheung
Party	Candidate	Votes	%	±%
123DA	Mak Ip-sing	1,693	69.33	+2.44
DAB	Lee Yat-po	749	30.67	–2.44
Majority		944	38.66	+4.88
Democratic Alliance hold		Swing	+2.44	

Yuen Long District Board Election, 1994: Fung Cheung
Party	Candidate	Votes	%	±%
Democratic	Mak Ip-sing	1,602	66.89	
DAB	Tang Chun-wan	793	33.11	
Majority		809	33.78	
Democratic win (new seat)				
