= Johnny Mak =

Johnny Mak Ip-sing
- 麥業成
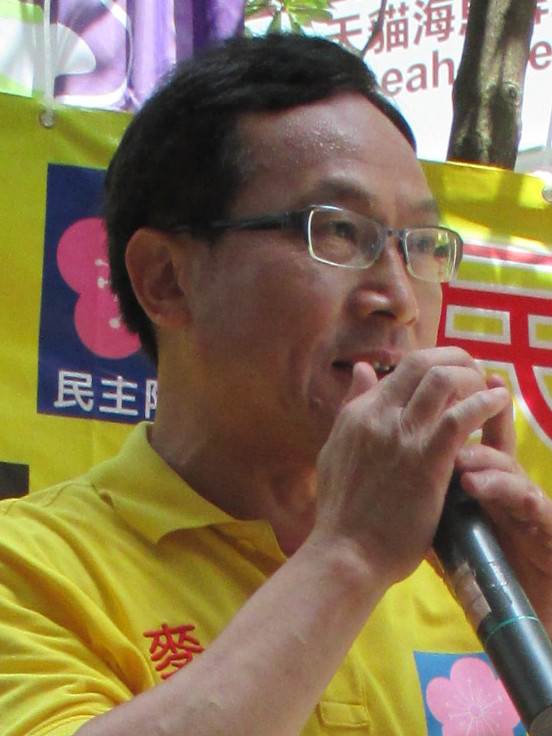
- Mak in 2015

Vice Chairman of the Yuen Long District Council
- In office 1 January 2020 – 12 July 2021
- Chairman: Zachary Wong
- Preceded by: Wong Wai-shun
- Succeeded by: Tang Ho-lin

Member of the Yuen Long District Council
- In office 1 April 1991 – 12 July 2021
- Preceded by: New constituency
- Succeeded by: Constituency Abolished
- Constituency: Fung Cheung

Personal details
- Born: 1960 (age 65–66) British Hong Kong
- Party: Democratic Alliance(2001-2021); Kuomintang
- Other political affiliations: People Power(2010-2011); League of Social Democrats(2011-2012)
- Education: Tamkang University (BA)
- Occupation: Politician

Johnny Mak Ip-sing (Chinese: 麥業成; born 1960) is a pro-ROC and pro-democracy politician in Hong Kong. He was a Yuen Long District Councillor from 1991 to 2021 and was the only Chairman of the now dissolved Democratic Alliance. Besides being the Chairman of the Democratic Alliance he was also a former Vice-Chairman of People Power and a executive committee member of the League of Social Democrats.

== Early life and education ==
Mak Ip-sing was born in 1960 in British Hong Kong in a pro-ROC background, he studied at ELCHK Yuen Long Lutheran Secondary School and later graduated from the Department of Japanese Language and Literature at the Tamkang University in Taiwan. After graduation he returned to Hong Kong.

== Career ==
He was the president of the Hong Kong Federation of Taiwan Universities Alumni Association from 2007 to 2011. He joined the democracy movement during the Tiananmen Square protests of 1989. He was member of the first major pro-democracy party United Democrats of Hong Kong which later transformed into the Democratic Party. In the 1991 District Board elections, he became member of the Yuen Long District Council through Yuen Long Town South and was re-elected through Fung Cheung in 1994. He continued to hold the seat until his resignation in 2021.

Mak was also a member of the pro-ROC 123 Democratic Alliance which was dissolved in 2000 before he joined the radical democratic party The Frontier. He contested in the 1995 Regional Council election and 1998 Legislative Council election with Yum Sin-ling for the 123 Democratic Alliance but was not elected. After the 2003 July 1 protests, he set up the local electoral alliance Yuen Long Tin Shui Wai Democratic Alliance with Albert Chan Wai-yip for the 2003 District Council election. He became member of the Executive Committee of the League of Social Democrats (LSD). During the intra-party factional struggle, he sided with former Chairman Wong Yuk-man and issued a public letter to criticise the incumbent Chairman Andrew To Kwan-hang. He later quit the party with Wong and became Vice-Chairman of the new party, People Power which set up by Wong.

In 2011 District Council election, he became the only People Power candidate who won a seat in the election. In 2012, he disputed with the party over the candidacy in the 2012 Legislative Council election. He quit the party on 28 June 2012 and ran under the banner of the Democratic Alliance, but failed to be elected with 2,896 votes.

On the issue of the Occupy Central movement campaigned by the pan-democrats with the aims at pressing the Beijing government to implement genuine universal suffrage, Mak was accused by pro-Beijing newspaper Tai Kung Pao of working for the Military Intelligence Bureau of the ROC National Security Bureau. Mak dismissed the accusation, saying it was a joke.

In July 2021, Mak resigned from his post as district councilor which he held for three decades, later he left Hong Kong indefinitely.

== Positions ==
In addition to being the former Chairman of the Democratic Alliance and Vice-chairman of the Yuen Long District Council, Mak served other positions before his departure from Hong Kong.

Mak formerly served as the primary organizer of yearly Double Tenth celebrations in Hong Kong at Hung Lau. He was chairman of the Highwise Yuen Long Service Centre, the group which manages the memorial garden.

He was also the Honorary President of the Hong Kong Federation of Taiwan Universities Alumni Association, and is Vice President of the Tamkang University Alumni Association.

Political offices
New constituency	Member of Yuen Long District Council; Representative for Fung Cheung; 1994–2021	Vacant
Preceded by Wong Wai-shun	Vice Chairman of Yuen Long District Council; 2020–2021	Succeeded by Tang Ho-lin
