= Republican Fever =

Nostalgia for early 20th-century Chinese aesthetics

Republican Fever (simplified Chinese: 民国热; traditional Chinese: 民國熱; pinyin: Mínguó Rè) refers to a cultural phenomenon in mainland China that expresses nostalgia in terms of popular culture entertainment (such as in television series and films) and fashion of the Republican era. Some cultural-related industries and ideological fields within mainland China have expressed some forms of this sentiment, and this period is a popular setting in many Chinese shows and works of fiction.

== Origin ==
The rise of 'Republican Fever' in mainland China can be traced back to the 1990s, when mainland Chinese scholars began to reflect on the established CCP view of ROC history.

A 2007 report in the China Youth Daily described the "Republican Fever" in the publishing industry in mainland China. Since 2010, the modern mainland had a wide audience of Republican Fever, with a more nostalgic view of the Republic of China (1912–1949), and an interest in the political figures and academic masters of the period. Republican-era related cultural products became abundant, with the Internet, movies and TV dramas, and publications as the main channels of dissemination.

== Reaction ==
Criticisms of 'Republican Fever' from some sectors within the People's Republic of China (PRC) include, firstly, the promotion of historical nihilism and the vilification of the Chinese Communist Party and the government of the PRC; secondly, the satirizing of the past with the use of Spring and Autumn brushstrokes; and, thirdly, the use of this issue as a tool for attacking the political system of the PRC. Critics of romanticization of the Republican era argues that it could lead to denial of the legitimacy of the PRC representing China.

However, as a form of nostalgia for early 20th-century Chinese fashion, music and pop culture, 'Republican Fever' in general can refer to romanticization of the aesthetics of the time period without ideological opposition to the PRC, and the government of the PRC has begun rehabilitating the legacy of the Republican era within mainland China. For example, many mainland Chinese television series and films are set during the early 20th century. The 2009 movie sponsored by the Chinese Communist Party, The Founding of a Republic, moved away from casting Chiang Kai-shek as 'evil' versus Mao Zedong, and emphasizing instead that the contingencies of war led the communists to victory.
