= Yuen Long Nullah =

Nullah in Hong Kong

Yuen Long Nullah (Chinese: 元朗渠) is a nullah across western Yuen Long, Hong Kong. It starts off as a stream west of Tai Tong and flows north into Yuen Long Town. It then changes course to the northeast and connects with Shan Pui River.

== See also ==
- List of rivers and nullahs in Hong Kong
