= Long Ping Estate =

Public housing estate in Yuen Long, Hong Kong

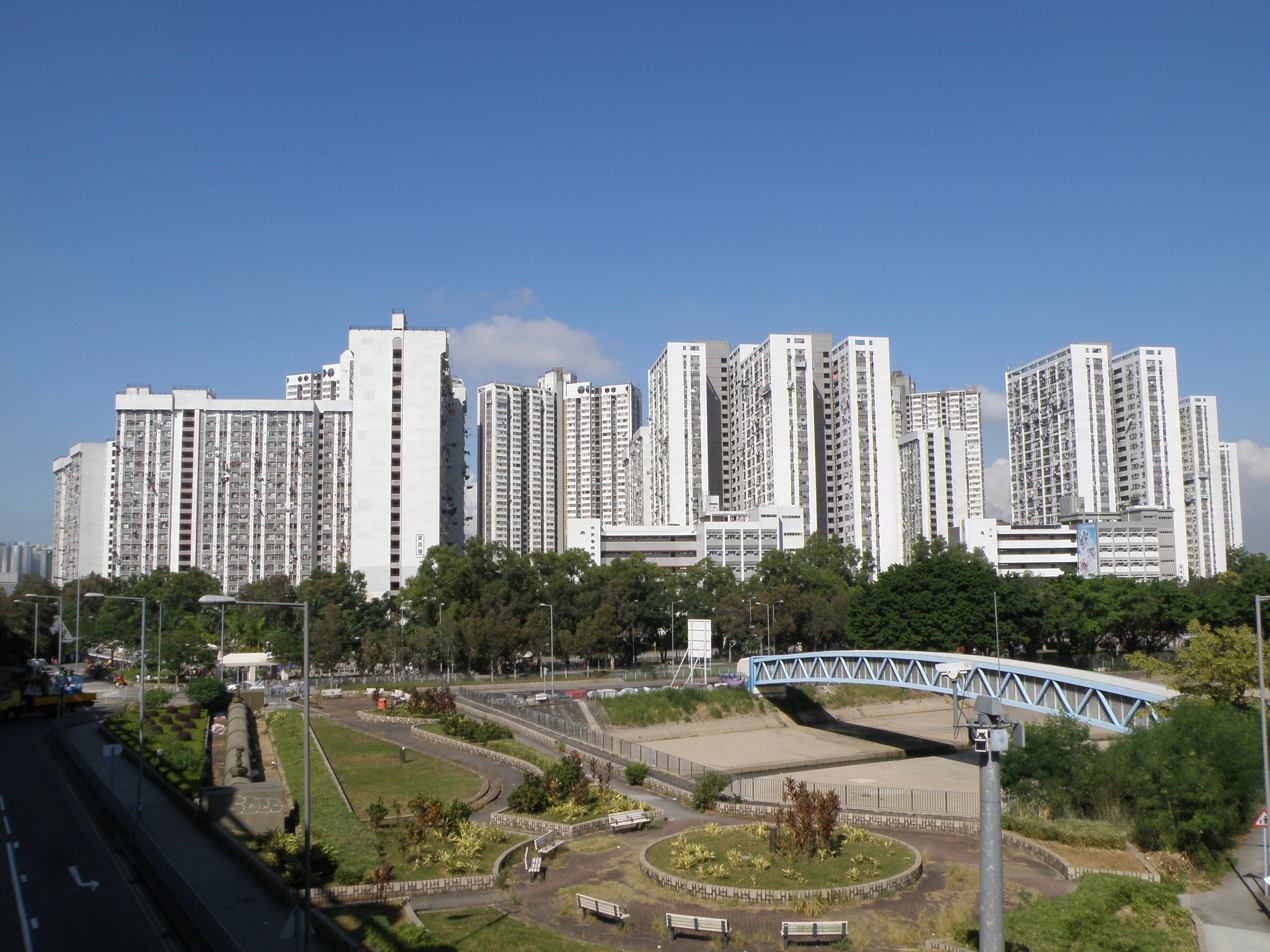
- Long Ping Estate
- Interactive map of Long Ping Estate

General information
- Location: 1 Long Ping Road, Yuen Long; New Territories, Hong Kong
- Coordinates: 22.44959°N 114.023816°E
- Status: Completed
- Category: Public rental housing
- Population: 23,687 (2016)
- No. of blocks: 15
- No. of units: 7,563

Construction
- Constructed: 1986; 40 years ago
- Authority: Hong Kong Housing Authority

Long Ping Estate (Chinese: 朗屏邨) is a mixed TPS and public housing estate in Wang Chau, Yuen Long, New Territories, Hong Kong, near MTR Long Ping station. It is the third public housing estate in Yuen Long Town and the largest public housing estate in Yuen Long New Town, consisting of fifteen residential blocks completed between 1986 and 1989. Some of the flats were sold to tenants through Tenants Purchase Scheme Phase 6B in 2005.

== Houses ==
Name	Chinese name	Building type	Completed
Yuet Ping House	悅屏樓	New slab	1987
Hor Ping House	賀屏樓	New slab	1987
Shek Ping House	石屏樓	New slab	1986
Kang Ping House	鏡屏樓	New slab	1986
Kam Ping House	錦屏樓	Double H	1986
Sau Ping House	繡屏樓	Double H	1986
Chu Ping House	珠屏樓	Double H	1986
Po Ping House	寶屏樓	Double H	1986
Ngan Ping House	雁屏樓	Double H	1989
Yin Ping House	燕屏樓	Double H	1989
Fung Ping House	鳳屏樓	Double H	1989
Cheuk Ping House	鵲屏樓	Double H	1989
Yuk Ping House	玉屏樓	Trident 2	1986
Wah Ping House	畫屏樓	Trident 2	1989
Hay Ping House	喜屏樓	Trident 2	1989

== Demographics ==
According to the 2016 by-census, Long Ping Estate had a population of 23,687. The median age was 45.5 and the majority of residents (97.8 per cent) were of Chinese ethnicity. The average household size was 2.9 people. The median monthly household income of all households (i.e. including both economically active and inactive households) was HK$22,500.

== Politics ==
For the 2019 District Council election, the estate fell within two constituencies. Most of the estate is located in the Pek Long constituency, which is currently represented by Kwong Chun-yu, while the remainder of the estate falls within the Nam Ping constituency, which is currently represented by Zachary Wong Wai-yin.

== Education ==
Long Ping Estate is in Primary One Admission (POA) School Net 73. Within the school net are multiple aided schools (operated independently but funded with government money) and one government school: South Yuen Long Government Primary School (南元朗官立小學).

== See also ==
- Public housing estates in Yuen Long
