= Democratic Alliance (Hong Kong) =

Democratic Alliance 民主陣線
- Chairman: Johnny Mak
- Founded: 2003
- Dissolved: 12 July 2021
- Ideology: Liberalism (HK); Conservatism (Taiwan); Anti-communism (HK); Three Principles of the People; Economic liberalism
- Political position: Centre-right to right-wing
- Regional affiliation: Pro-ROC camp Pro-democracy camp
- Colours: Blue and yellow

Website
- Official Facebook page

Democratic Alliance
- Traditional Chinese: 民主陣線
Transcriptions
Yue: Cantonese
- Yale Romanization: Màhn jyú jahn sin
- Jyutping: Man^{4} zyu^{2} zan^{6} sin^{3}

Yuen Long Tin Shui Wai Democratic Alliance
- Traditional Chinese: 元朗天水圍民主陣線
Transcriptions
Yue: Cantonese
- Yale Romanization: Yùhn lóhng tīn séui wàih màhn jyú jahn sin
- Jyutping: Jyun^{4} long^{5} tin^{1} seoi^{2} wai^{4} man^{4} zyu^{2} zan^{6} sin^{3}

The Democratic Alliance, formerly the Yuen Long Tin Shui Wai Democratic Alliance from 2003 to 2007, was a pro-democracy, pro-ROC political group in Hong Kong established in 2003 and dissolved in 2021. The final chairman of the alliance was Johnny Mak Ip-sing, who was also a member of Yuen Long District Council.

== History ==
The alliance was established in 2003 by a group of pro-ROC politicians under the initiatives of the Legislative Council member Albert Chan Wai-yip after he split from the Democratic Party and wanted to consolidate his political base in the New Territories West.

The group filed five members in the Yuen Long District in the 2003 District Council elections, and won three seats in the Yuen Long District Council, while Albert Chan Wai Yip himself retained his seat in the Tsuen Wan District. In the 2007 District Council elections, they rebranded from the Yuen Long Tin Shui Wai Democratic Alliance to simply Democratic Alliance. The Democratic Alliance became part of Albert Chan's radical pro-democracy alliance People Power in 2011. Johnny Mak became the only People Power candidate win a seat in the 2011 District Council elections. In 2012, the Democratic Alliance broke apart from the People Power as Johnny Mak wanted to lead a candidate list in the coming 2012 LegCo elections. The group failed to win a seat in the New Territories West constituency.

In the 2019 District Council elections, the party fielded 3 candidates and won 2 seats, that being Mak Ip-sing representing Fung Cheung and Shek King Ching representing Yuen Long Centre.

The party was dissolved in July 2021 following the enactment of the National Security Law.

== Electoral performance ==
=== Legislative Council elections ===
| Election | Number of popular votes | % of popular votes | GC seats | FC seats | Total seats | +/− |
|---|---|---|---|---|---|---|
| 2012 | 2,896▲ | 0.16▼ | 0 | 0 | 0 / 70 | 0 |

=== District Councils elections ===
| Election | Number of popular votes | % of popular votes | Total elected seats | +/− |
|---|---|---|---|---|
| 2003 | 6,928 | 0.66 | 3 / 400 | 1▲ |
| 2007 | 9,530▲ | 0.84▲ | 1 / 405 | 2▼ |
| 2011 | People Power ticket | | 1 / 412 | 0 |
| 2015 | 5,313 | 0.37 | 1 / 431 | 0 |
| 2019 | 9,886▲ | 0.34▼ | 2 / 452 | 1▲ |
