= Yuen Long District Council =

Local government council in Hong Kong

Yuen Long District Council 元朗區議會

Type
- Type: Hong Kong District Council of the Yuen Long District

History
- Founded: 1 April 1981; 45 years ago (District Board); 1 July 1997; 29 years ago (Provisional); 1 January 2000; 26 years ago (District Council)

Leadership
- Chair: Gordon Wu Tin-yau, Independent

Structure
- Seats: 46 councillors consisting of 8 elected members 16 district committee members 16 appointed members 6 ex officio members
- DAB: 12 / 46
- FTU: 3 / 46
- BPA: 1 / 46
- PoD: 1 / 46
- Independent: 29 / 46

Elections
- Voting system: First past the post
- Last election: 10 December 2023

Meeting place
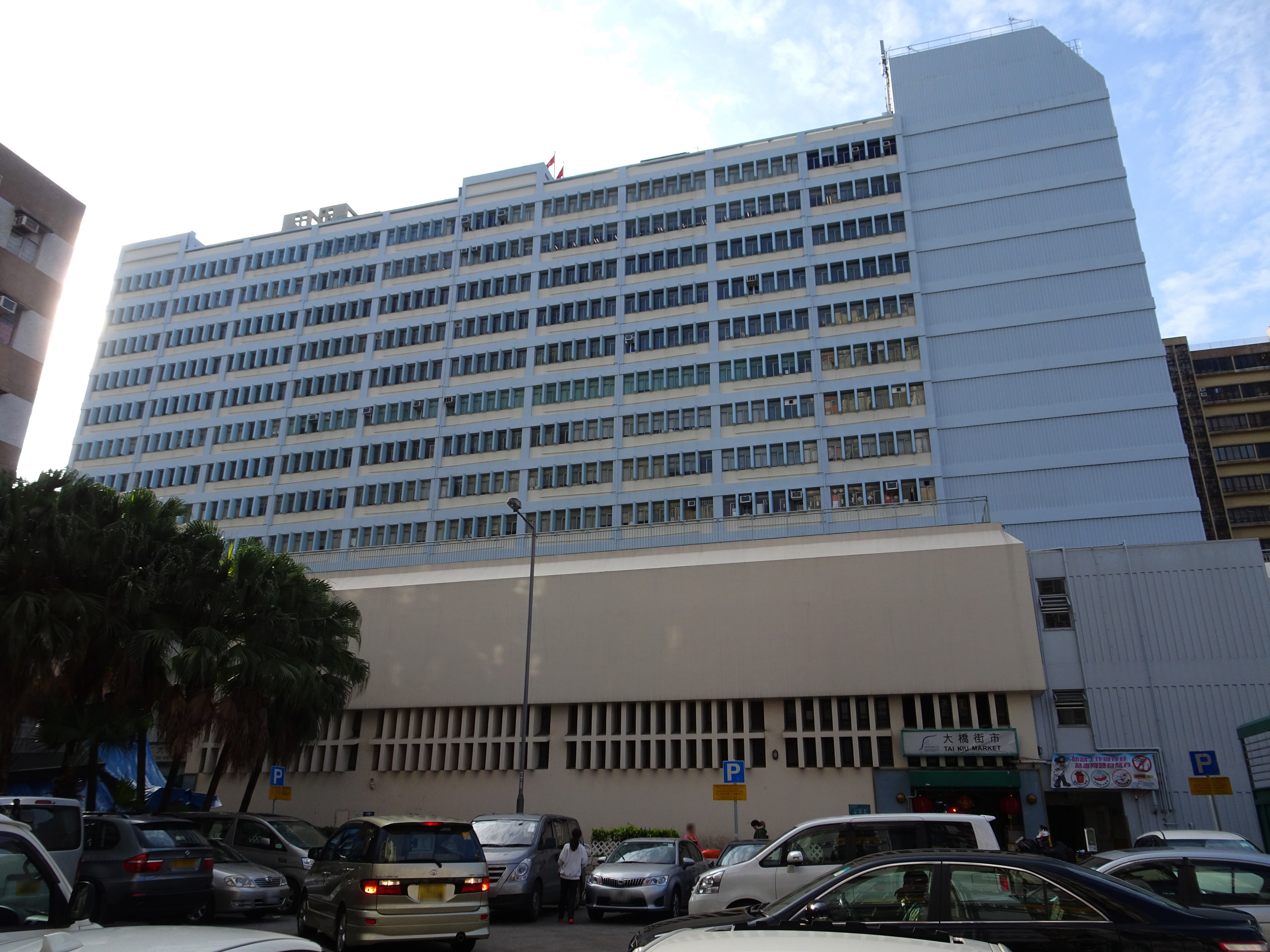
- 13/F., Yuen Long Government Offices, No.2, Kiu Lok Square, Yuen Long, New Territories

Website
- www.districtcouncils.gov.hk/yl/

The Yuen Long District Council (Chinese: 元朗區議會; noted as YL) is the district council for the Yuen Long District in Hong Kong. It is one of 18 such councils. The Yuen Long District currently consists of 46 members, of which the district is divided into four constituencies, electing a total of 8 members, 16 district committee members, 16 appointed members, and 6 ex officio members who are the Shap Pat Heung, San Tin, Ha Tsuen, Kam Tin, Ping Shan and Pat Heung rural committee chairmen. The latest election was held on 10 December 2023.

== History ==
The Yuen Long District Council was established on 1 April 1981 under the name of the Yuen Long District Board as the result of the colonial Governor Murray MacLehose's District Administration Scheme reform. The District Board was partly elected with the ex-officio Regional Council members and chairmen of six Rural Committees, Shap Pat Heung, San Tin, Ha Tsuen, Kam Tin, Ping Shan and Pat Heung, as well as members appointed by the Governor until 1994 when last Governor Chris Patten refrained from appointing any member.

The Yuen Long District Board became Yuen Long Provisional District Board after the Hong Kong Special Administrative Region (HKSAR) was established in 1997 with the appointment system being reintroduced by Chief Executive Tung Chee-hwa. The current Yuen Long District Council was established on 1 January 2000 after the first District Council election in 1999. The appointed seats were abolished in 2015 after the modified constitutional reform proposal was passed by the Legislative Council in 2010.

The Yuen Long District Council is one of the fastest growing council due to the development of the new towns of Yuen Long and Tin Shui Wai, and has become the largest council of the territory. It had been tightly dominated by the rural forces due to its vast rural areas and the ex-officio rural committee representatives. The chairmanship of the council had been taken by rural or rural-related councillors, such as Tai Kuen, chairman from 1985 to 1999, was a rural strongman; Tang Siu-tong, chairman from 2000 to 2007, was a rural leader which represented the Hong Kong Progressive Alliance and was elected to the Legislative Council in 2000 on the pro-Beijing Democratic Alliance for the Betterment of Hong Kong (DAB) ticket; Leung Che-cheung, chairman from 2008 to 2015, was a member of the DAB and president of the New Territories Association of Societies (NTAS) who has been Legislative Councillor since 2012.

The Tin Shui Wai new town was also dominated by the pro-Beijing forces. The pro-democrats have limited influence in the district, such as Zachary Wong and Kwong Chun-yu in Long Ping Estate and the pro-Taipei Democratic Alliance's Johnny Mak in Fung Cheung. On the capacity of Yuen Long District Councillor, Kwong was elected to the Legislative Council through the District Council (Second) constituency in 2016.

The pro-Beijing and rural domination was turned over in the 2019 historic landslide victory where the pro-democrats took over all the urban constituencies and a few rural constituencies amid the massive pro-democracy protests. All pro-Beijing councillors in Tin Shui Wai including Luk Chung-hung of the Hong Kong Federation of Trade Unions (FTU) being unseated and some rural incumbents were also surprisingly defeated. As a result, the pro-democrats took 33 of the 39 elected seats and seized control of the 45-member council for the first time.

In the 2023 District Council election, 8 of the 46 seats on the Yuen Long District Council are elected by elected members, 16 are elected by district committees, 16 are appointed members, and 6 ex-officio members make up the current Yuen Long District Council. In the Yuen Long District Council, among the 46 members, 29 are independent members, 12 are from the Democratic Alliance for Betterment of Hong Kong, 3 from the Federation of Trade Unions, 1 from the Economic Alliance for Democracy, and 1 from democratic ideas. Among the 46 members, 45 are from the pro-establishment camp while 1 positions itself as centrist.

== Political control ==
Since 1982 political control of the council has been held by the following parties:

Camp in control	Largest party	Years	Composition
No Overall Control	None	1982 - 1985	
Pro-government	Reform Club	1985 - 1988	
Pro-government	Meeting Point	1988 - 1991	
Pro-government	United Democrats	1991 - 1994	
Pro-Beijing	Democratic	1994 - 1997	
Pro-Beijing	Democratic	1997 - 1999	
Pro-Beijing	DAB	2000 - 2003	
Pro-Beijing	DAB	2004 - 2007	
Pro-Beijing	DAB	2008 - 2011	
Pro-Beijing	DAB	2012 - 2015	
Pro-Beijing	DAB	2016 - 2019	
Pro-democracy → Pro-Beijing	Democratic → None	2020 - 2023	
Pro-Beijing	DAB	2024 - 2027	

== Political makeup ==

Elections are held every four years.

Political party	Council members							Current members
Political party	1994	1999	2003	2007	2011	2015	2019	Current members
Independent	15	14	17	15	14	17	20	25 / 45
Democratic	3	1	2	2	3	2	7	7 / 45
TSWC	-	-	-	-	-	-	4	3 / 45
Action 18	-	-	-	-	-	-	2	2 / 45
DA	-	-	4	1	-	1	2	2 / 45
Civic Passion	-	-	-	-	-	-	1	1 / 45
TSWLPU	-	-	-	-	-	-	-	1 / 45

== District result maps ==
1994

1999

2003

2007

2011

2015

2019

== Members represented ==
Capacity	Code	Constituency	Name	Political affiliation	Term		Notes
Elected	M01	Yuen Long Town Centre	Riben Li Kai-lap	DAB	1 January 2024	Incumbent	
Elected	M01	Yuen Long Town Centre	Sei Chun-hing	Independent	1 January 2024	Incumbent	
Elected	M02	Yuen Long Rural East	Leung Min-kin	Independent	1 January 2024	Incumbent	
Elected	M02	Yuen Long Rural East	Chui Kwan-siu	DAB	1 January 2024	Incumbent	
Elected	M03	Tin Shui Wai South and Ping Ha	Terry So Yuen	DAB	1 January 2024	Incumbent	
Elected	M03	Tin Shui Wai South and Ping Ha	Yankie Chan Kin-yang	Independent	1 January 2024	Incumbent	
Elected	M04	Tin Shui Wai North	Yiu Kwok-wai	FTU	1 January 2024	Incumbent	
Elected	M04	Tin Shui Wai North	Fennie Lai Yuet-kwan	DAB	1 January 2024	Incumbent	
District Committees			Tom Tong Tak-chun	DAB	1 January 2024	Incumbent	
District Committees			Leung Yip-pang	DAB	1 January 2024	Incumbent	
District Committees			Ma Shuk-yin	DAB	1 January 2024	Incumbent	
District Committees			Lam Wai-ming	DAB	1 January 2024	Incumbent	
District Committees			Calvin Sze To Chun-hin	DAB	1 January 2024	Incumbent	
District Committees			Lau Kwai-yung	FTU	1 January 2024	Incumbent	
District Committees			Lam Wai-ming	Independent	1 January 2024	Incumbent	
District Committees			Amy Yuen Man-yee	Independent	1 January 2024	Incumbent	
District Committees			Man Yick-yeung	Independent	1 January 2024	Incumbent	
District Committees			Lam Chung-yin	Independent	1 January 2024	Incumbent	
District Committees			Wong Shiu-chung	Independent	1 January 2024	Incumbent	
District Committees			Ricky Tsui Wai-ngoi	Independent	1 January 2024	Incumbent	
District Committees			Wong Yuen-tai	Independent	1 January 2024	Incumbent	
District Committees			Lucy Ho Hiu-man	Independent	1 January 2024	Incumbent	
District Committees			Ronnie Tang Yung-yiu	Independent	1 January 2024	Incumbent	
District Committees			Li Ching-yee	Independent	1 January 2024	Incumbent	
Appointed			Yu Chung-leung	DAB	1 January 2024	Incumbent	
Appointed			Lui Kin	DAB	1 January 2024	Incumbent	
Appointed			Weelie Wong Wai-ling	DAB	1 January 2024	Incumbent	
Appointed			Wong Hiu-shan	FTU	1 January 2024	Incumbent	
Appointed			Chong Kin-shing	BPA	1 January 2024	Incumbent	
Appointed			Allan Wong Wing-ho	PoD	1 January 2024	Incumbent	
Appointed			Wilson Shum Ho-kit	Independent	1 January 2024	Incumbent	
Appointed			Donald Man Ka-ho	Independent	1 January 2024	Incumbent	
Appointed			Desmond Wong Wai-leung	Independent	1 January 2024	Incumbent	
Appointed			Lam Tim-fook	Independent	1 January 2024	Incumbent	
Appointed			Cheung Wai-sum	Independent	1 January 2024	Incumbent	
Appointed			Chan Ka-fai	Independent	1 January 2024	Incumbent	
Appointed			Daniel Cham Ka-hung	Independent	1 January 2024	Incumbent	
Appointed			Frankie Fung Chun-wing	Independent	1 January 2024	Incumbent	
Appointed			Chiu Sau-han	Independent	1 January 2024	Incumbent	
Appointed			Tam Tak-hoi	Independent	1 January 2024	Incumbent	
Ex officio		Shap Pat Heung Rural Committee Chairman	Ching Chan-ming	Independent	1 January 2024	Incumbent	
Ex officio		San Tin Rural Committee Chairman	Man Luk-shing	Independent	1 January 2024	Incumbent	
Ex officio		Ha Tsuen Rural Committee Chairman	Tang Sin-hang	Independent	1 January 2024	Incumbent	
Ex officio		Kam Tin Rural Committee Chairman	Tang Ho-lin	Independent	1 January 2024	Incumbent	
Ex officio		Ping Shan Rural Committee Chairman	Tang Che-keung	Independent	1 January 2024	Incumbent	
Ex officio		Pat Heung Rural Committee Chairman	Alan Kwok Wing-cheong	Independent	1 January 2024	2 August 2025	Died in office
Ex officio		Pat Heung Rural Committee Chairman	Tang Chi-kwong	Independent	November 2025	Incumbent	

== Leadership ==
=== Chairs ===
Since 1985, the chairman is elected by all the members of the board:

Chairman	Years	Political Affiliation
Fung Kwok-keung	1981–1982	District Officer
J. K. Wilson	1982–1985	District Officer
Tai Kuen	1985–1999	Heung Yee Kuk
Tang Siu-tong	2000–2007	PA→DAB
Leung Che-cheung	2008–2015	DAB/NTAS
Shum Ho-kit	2016–2019	Heung Yee Kuk
Zachary Wong Wai-ying	2020–2021	Democratic
Shum Ho-kit	2021–2023	Independent
Gordon Wu Tin-yau	2024–present	District Officer

=== Vice Chairs ===
Vice Chairman	Years	Political Affiliation
Leung Che-cheung	2000–2008	DAB
Tang Yun-chor	2008–2011	Heung Yee Kuk
Leung Fuk-yuen	2011	Heung Yee Kuk
Wong Wai-shun	2012–2019	NPP→BPA
Johnny Mak Ip-sing	2020–2021	Democratic Alliance
Tang Ho-lin	2021–2023	Independent
