= Hong Kong News-Expo =

- 香港新聞博覽館
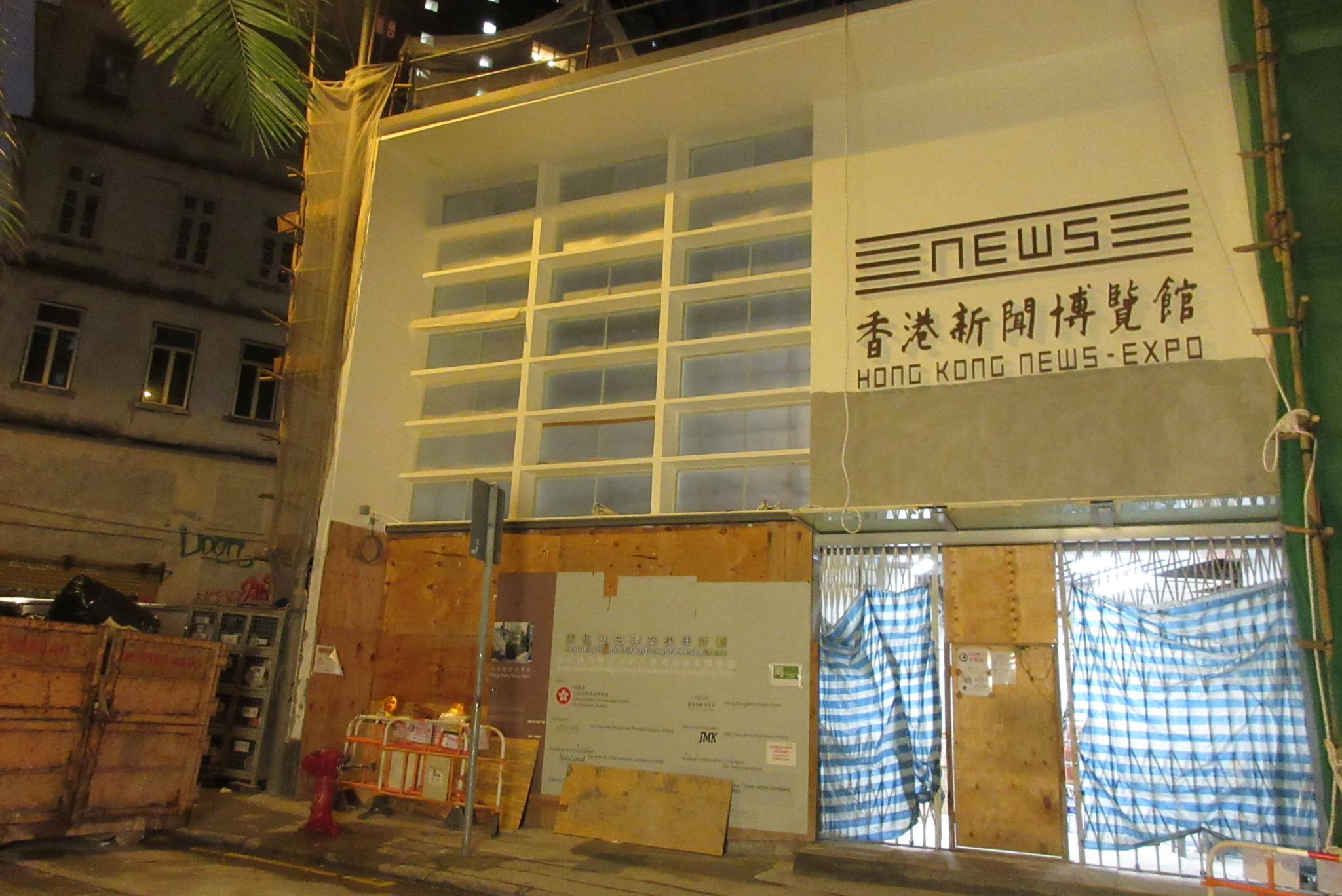
- Hong Kong News-Expo in January 2018
- Established: 5 December 2018
- Location: Former Bridges Street Market, 2 Bridges Street, Sheung Wan, Hong Kong
- Chairperson: Dr John Chan Cho-chak
- Curator: Programme Committee
- Owner: Journalism Education Foundation Hong Kong Limited
- Website: Official website

Hong Kong News-Expo
- Traditional Chinese: 香港新聞博覽館
Transcriptions
Yue: Cantonese
- Yale Romanization: Hēung góng sān mán bok láahm gún
- Jyutping: Hoeng1 gong2 san1 man2 bok3 laam5 gun2

Hong Kong News-Expo is a museum dedicated to the history and significance of the news media in Hong Kong. It is housed inside the former Bridges Street Market at No. 2, Bridges Street in Central District, Hong Kong Island. The heritage building was among the first batch of public markets built after the end of World War II and was opened in 1953. The building sits partly on the former site of the American Congregational Mission Preaching Hall, where Dr Sun Yat-sen, founder of the Republic of China, was baptised in 1884. In 2013, under Batch III of the Revitalising Historic Buildings Through Partnership Scheme, the Journalism Education Foundation Hong Kong Limited was granted the right to revitalise the property into Asia's first education facility with news as the main theme.

In April 2016, the Legislative Council's Finance Committee approved the allocation of HK$85.3 million for the revitalisation project. The venue has a total floor area of about 10,000 square feet. Hong Kong News-Expo was opened to the public on 6 December 2018. Its exhibits chronicle the evolution of Hong Kong's news media, present the city's political, economic and social transformations through contemporary news reports, and demonstrate the importance of the free flow of information as a cornerstone of Hong Kong's success.

== Facilities and activities ==
Hong Kong News-Expo will feature exhibitions that:

- Present the evolution of Hong Kong's newspapers, radio news, television news and online news through historical TV footage, audio and visual records, news clippings, artefacts and published information;
- Explore how changes in the methods of disseminating news have impacted the media and the society in this age of information;
- Demonstrate the importance of the free flow of information by showing how major new events were covered by different Hong Kong media;
- Showcase outstanding works of photo journalism; and
- Focus on specific media-related topics, such as the Reporting of the 2008 Sichuan Earthquakes.

Hong Kong News-Expo will also have the following facilities:

- Experiential and interactive studios for visitors to experience being a reporter in front of a camera;
- A souvenir shop that sells books and souvenirs related to news; and
- A multi-purpose room for media education activities.

Activities being planned include:

- Media education activities for students and youth;
- Seminars and workshops on media-related topics;
- Guided tours for visitors on Saturday and Sunday; and
- Guided tours for the elderly and under-privileged groups.

== History ==
=== Dr Sun Yat-sen ===
Bridges Street Market sits on part of the original site of the American Congregational Mission Preaching Hall (now China Congregational Church), which was founded by the Reverend Charles Robert Hager in 1883. In 1884, Dr Sun Yat-sen, founder of republican China, was baptised there while studying at the nearby Government Central School (now Queen's College).

The market is located in a very old part of Central with deep historical connections to the Hong Kong press. Most of the city's earliest newspapers set up their first offices there. Shing Wong Street, Gough Street and Wing Lee Street in the vicinity were known as the "Printers’ Streets" because of the clusters of printers and related businesses that used to operate there. The newspapers that had set up their offices in the area included:

- Chun Wan Yat Po (Universal Circulating Herald)
- China Daily
- Wah Kiu Yat Po
- Kung Sheung Daily News
- South China Morning Post
- Ta Kung Pao
- New Evening Post
- New Life Evening Post (Hsin Sheng Wan Pao)
- Wen Wei Po
- Hung Look Daily News
- Yuet Wah Daily News

=== Post-World War II markets ===
Bridges Street Market was built after the Second World War on the recommendation of the then Urban Council to cater to the demand for market services because of a surge in population. The market was inaugurated on April 30, 1953. On its ground floor were 26 stalls selling fish and poultry and on the first floor 33 selling beef, pork, fruit and vegetables. In 1969, part of the first floor was turned into a children's playground and two footbridges were built to link the building with Wing Lee Street.

=== Revitalisation ===
Bridges Street Market was classified as a Grade III historic building in September 2011. It was later included in Batch III of the Revitalising Historic Buildings Through Partnership Scheme. In February 2013, the Development Bureau announced that it had accepted the revitalisation proposal submitted by the Journalism Education Foundation Hong Kong Limited. The proposal aims to re-purpose the historic building to accommodate Hong Kong News-Expo, which will become an education-cum-exhibition facility for media education activities that would enhance both local and overseas visitors’ understanding of the Hong Kong news media.

== Conservation work ==
=== Conservation projects ===
Bridges Street Market will retain its original Bauhaus-style architectural design. The market's main staircases, poultry scalding room and some existing stalls will be kept for their representation of social and historical values. A lift will be built to provide unobstructed access to Wing Lee Street. The rubbish collection station adjacent to the market will be demolished. The original uphill vista of the staircases at Shing Wong Street leading to the Mid-Levels will be restored.

=== Architectural characteristics ===
A three-storey utilitarian building, Bridges Street Market is a reinforced concrete frame structure built in the International Modernist style generally accepted as originated in Germany by the Bauhaus School of Art in the 1920s. The architectural style's main characteristics, which can also be found in the market, include asymmetry, severe blocky cubic shapes, smooth flat plain undecorated surfaces often painted white, the complete elimination of all mouldings and ornament, flat roofs, large expanses of glass held in steel frames on the elevation, and long horizontal streamlined bands of windows. The adoption of reinforced concrete post-and-slab construction with flat slab floors and a flat roof-slab carried on concrete columns has created room for free planning. Partitions could be erected freely as desired, as they played no part in the structure bearing function of the building.

The front elevation of the market facing Bridges Street is an asymmetrical composition with the main entrance recessed on the left side flanked by a panel of Shanghai plaster grooved to resemble masonry. Above this panel is a large grid pattern window which illuminates the internal staircase. The remainder of the elevation is a plain painted rendered wall featuring two horizontal streamlined bands of windows with projected horizontal sun-shading concrete fins.

=== Mini-exhibitions and seminars ===
Newspapers and Old Hong Kong

Organised by the Journalism Education Foundation, an exhibition and a series of seminars on newspapers and Old Hong Kong were held at the G7 Centre, Wing Lee Street, between September 6 and October 13, 2013. Copies of newspapers published in the 1960s and 1970s were displayed to give a glimpse of Hong Kong society at that time. Speakers at the seminars included Mr Shiu Lo-sin, Mr Wong Chung-ming, Mr Chiu Sin-chun, Mr Cheng Po-hung and Mr Wai Kee-shun. [Note 4]

Hong Kong Newspapers during the Japanese Occupation

Hong Kong News-Expo held an exhibition and a seminar on Hong Kong newspapers during the Japanese Occupation at the G7 Centre, Wing Lee Street, in March 2016. Copies of newspapers published on December 25, 1941, when Hong Kong fell to the Japanese, and in 1945, when Japan surrendered, were displayed. Also on display were several copies of newspapers published during the occupation period, which were provided by Hong Kong resident Mr David Ma. A seminar on the press during the occupation was held after the exhibition's opening ceremony. Speakers included Dr Joseph Ting Sun-pao, Mr Cheng Po-hung, Prof Clement So and Mr Cheng Ming-yan.
