= Ladder streets =

Narrow streets with steps in Hong Kong

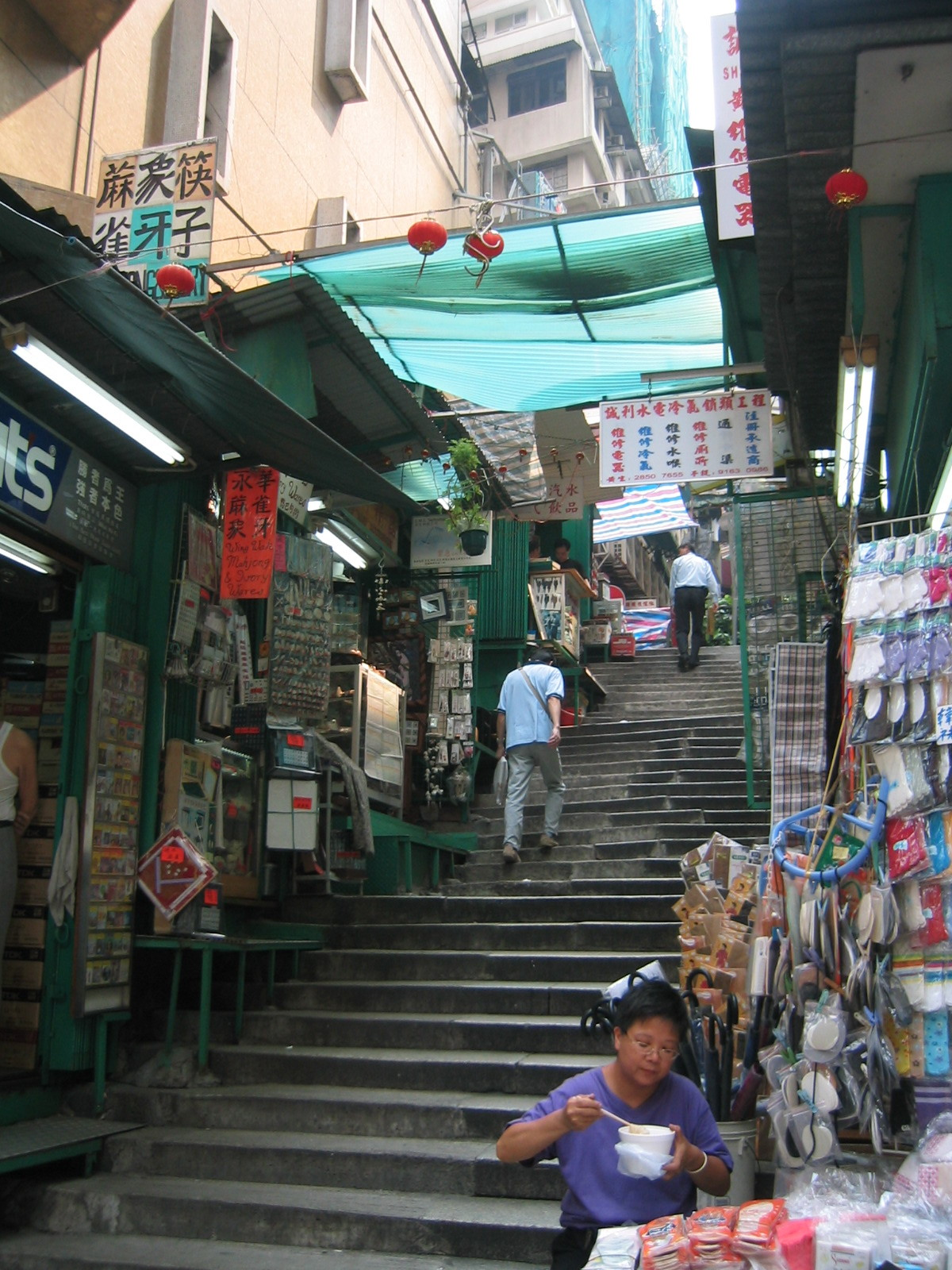
Aberdeen Street, one of the ladder streets in Central.

Ladder streets are narrow streets in Hong Kong comprising steps. Most are found between Central and Sheung Wan and Mid-Levels on Hong Kong Island, from Queen's Road Central, through Hollywood Road and a few other cross streets, to Caine Road at the Mid-Levels. Other ladder streets exist outside of the immediate Mid-Levels area, such as Sands Street in Kennedy Town.

Note that there is indeed a street named Ladder Street, composed entirely of stone steps, in Sheung Wan.

While some ladder streets are made only of traditional steps, some at a moderate incline have portions that could be traversed with a rickshaw or cart. These portions had raised stones perpendicular to the street at regular intervals acting like a ratchet so that carts and rickshaws could be easily stopped and parked. This kind of paving can be found on Pottinger Street.

The Duddell Street steps were declared a monument by the Antiquities and Monuments Office.

== History ==
Shortly after their arrival in Hong Kong, the British built administrative buildings on the northern shore of the island, in the area which came to be called Victoria and later called Central. The water met the island at what is now Queen's Road. There was no flat land, so during the brief tenure of Sir Henry Pottinger, the first governor of the colony, from 1841 to 1844, streets of steps were planned. The first recorded ladder street was built between Queen's Road and Gough Street in 1845. Remaining ladder streets steps are some of the very oldest structures in the territory.

The streets were originally made with the local pink granite. Most have been replaced with concrete.

== Ladder streets ==
- Shin Hing Street
- Pound Lane
- Ladder Street
- Sands Street
- Duddell Street
- Tung Street
- Bridges Street
- Aberdeen Street
- Shing Wong Street
- Pottinger Street
- Castle Steps
- Tank Lane
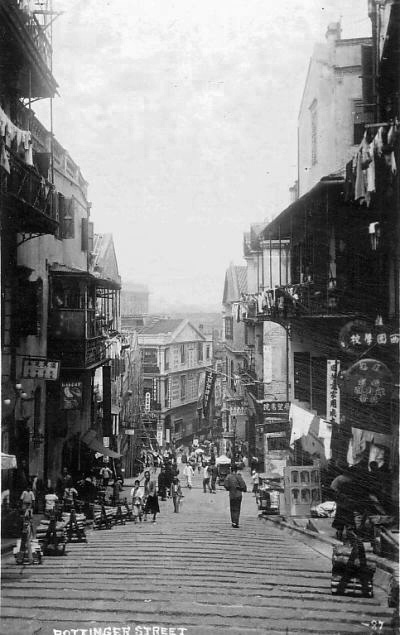
Pottinger St 1930s

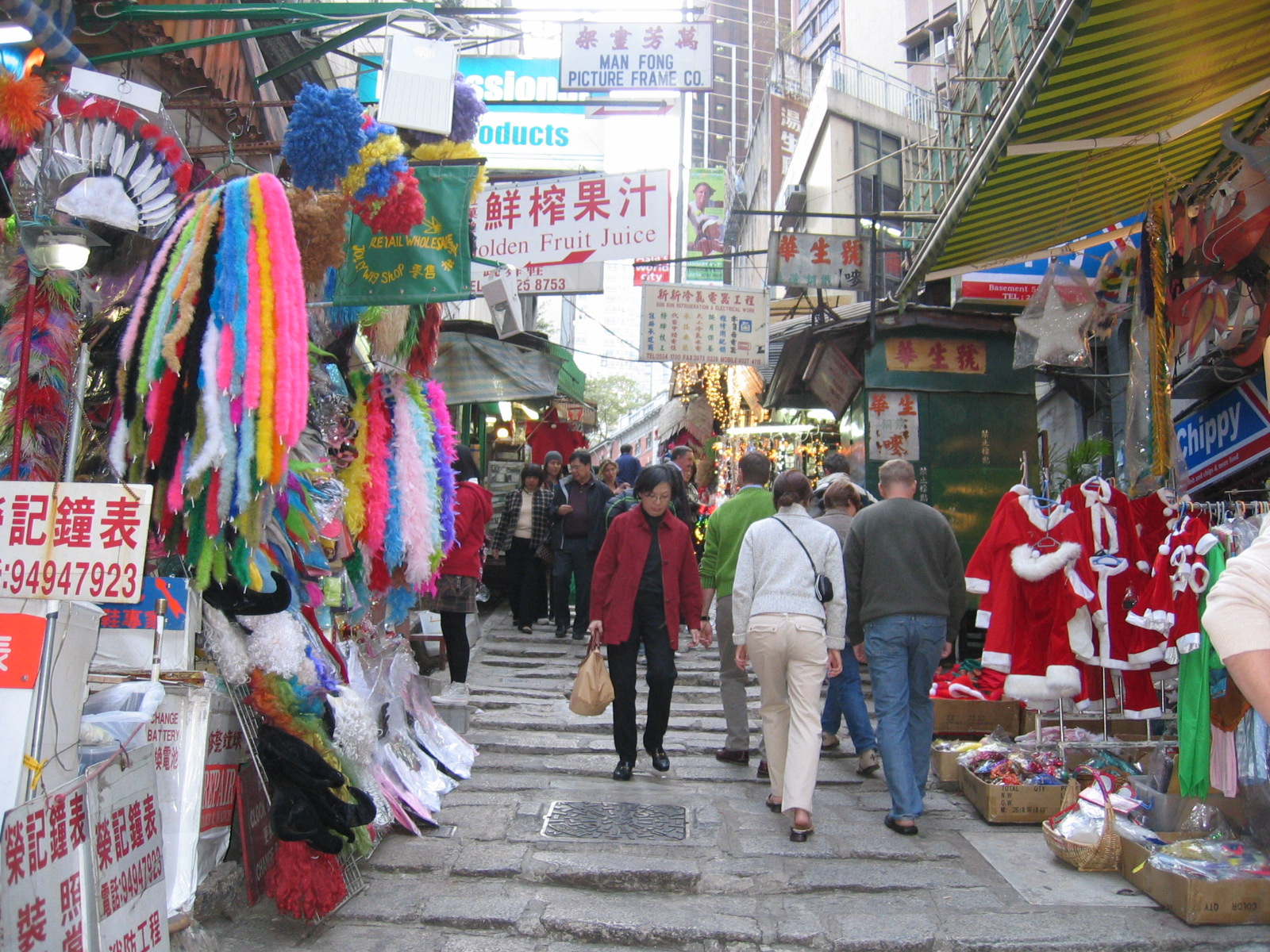
Pottinger St 2005

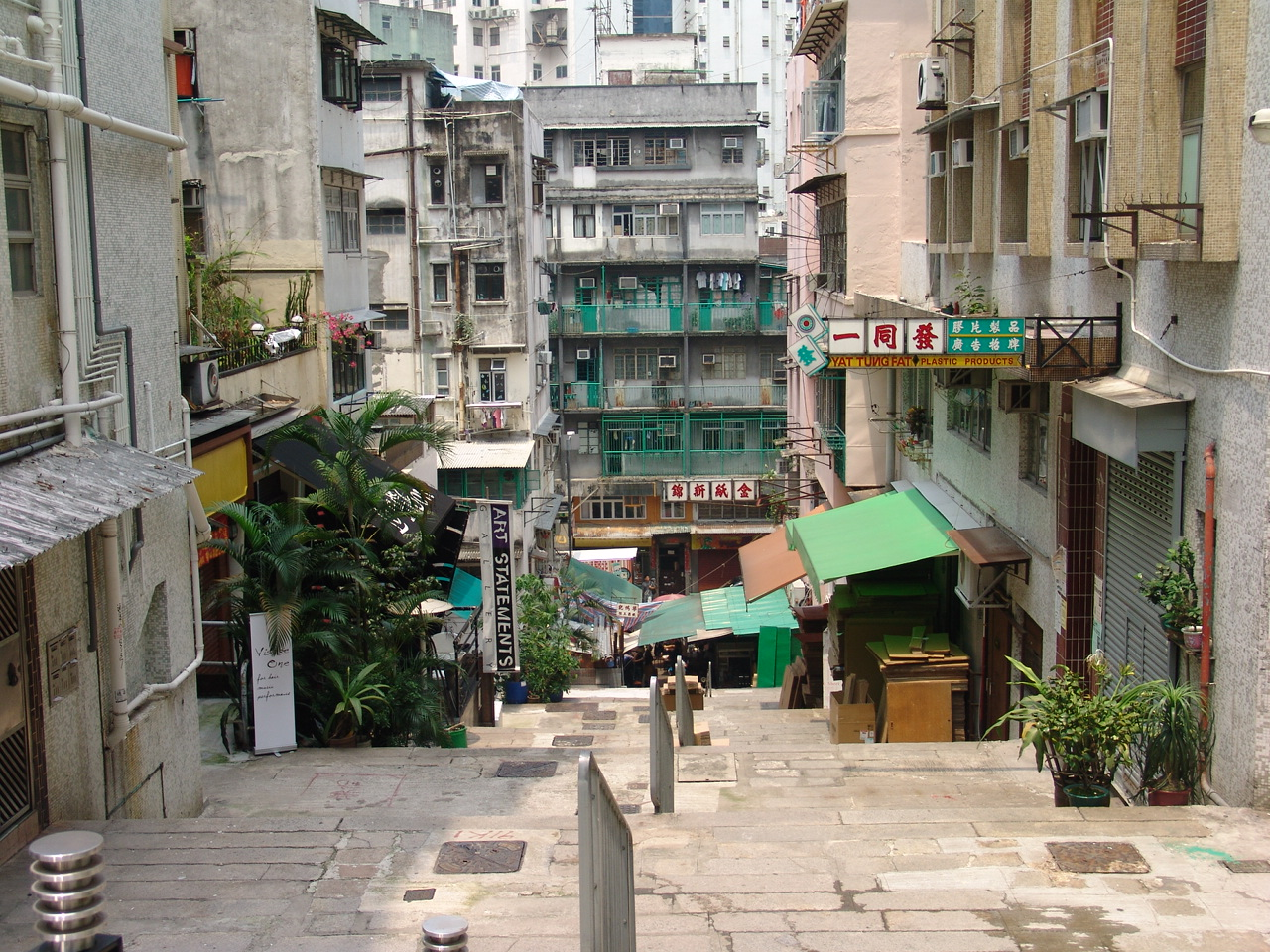
Mee Lun St 2005

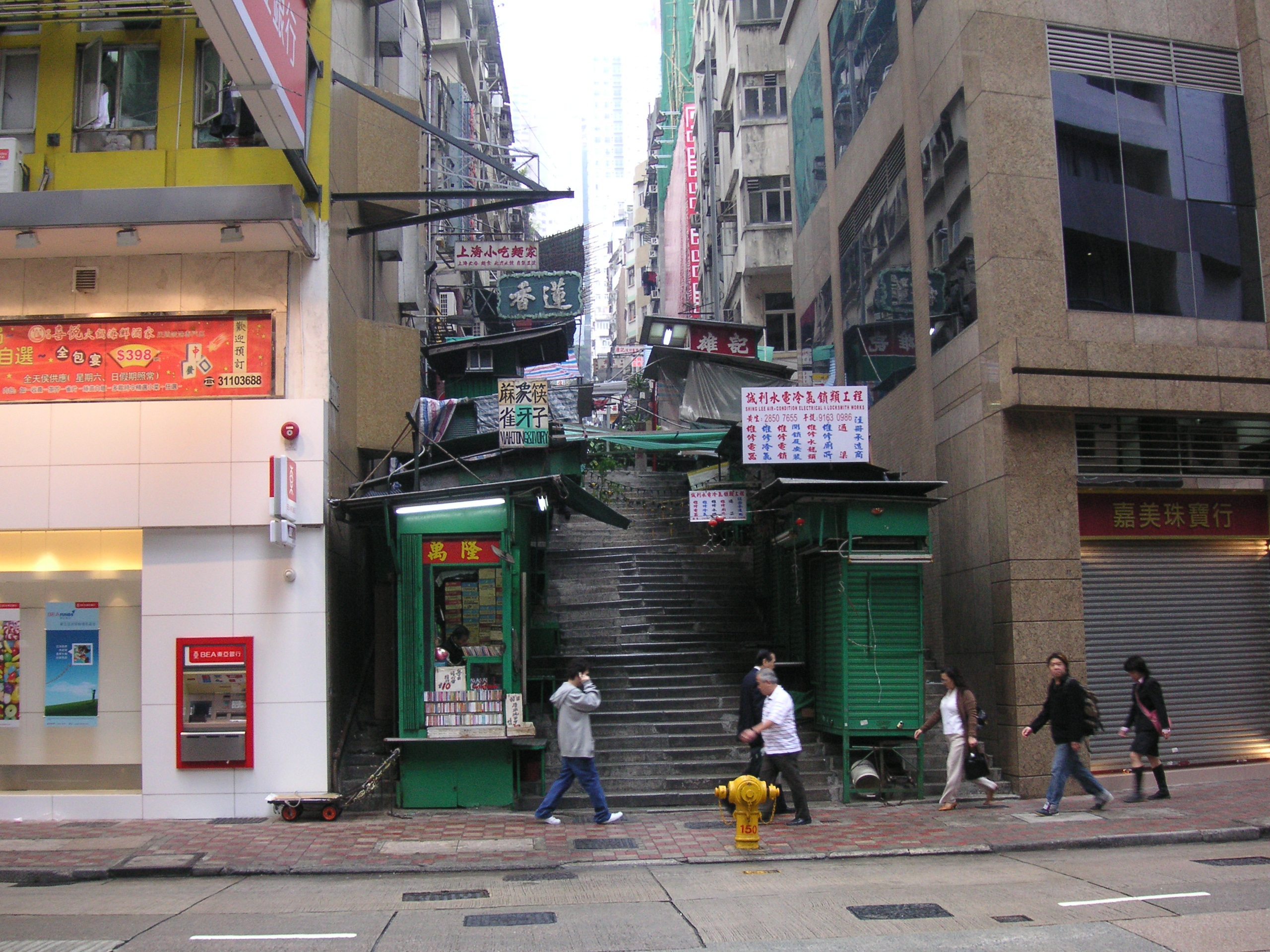
Aberdeen St 2006

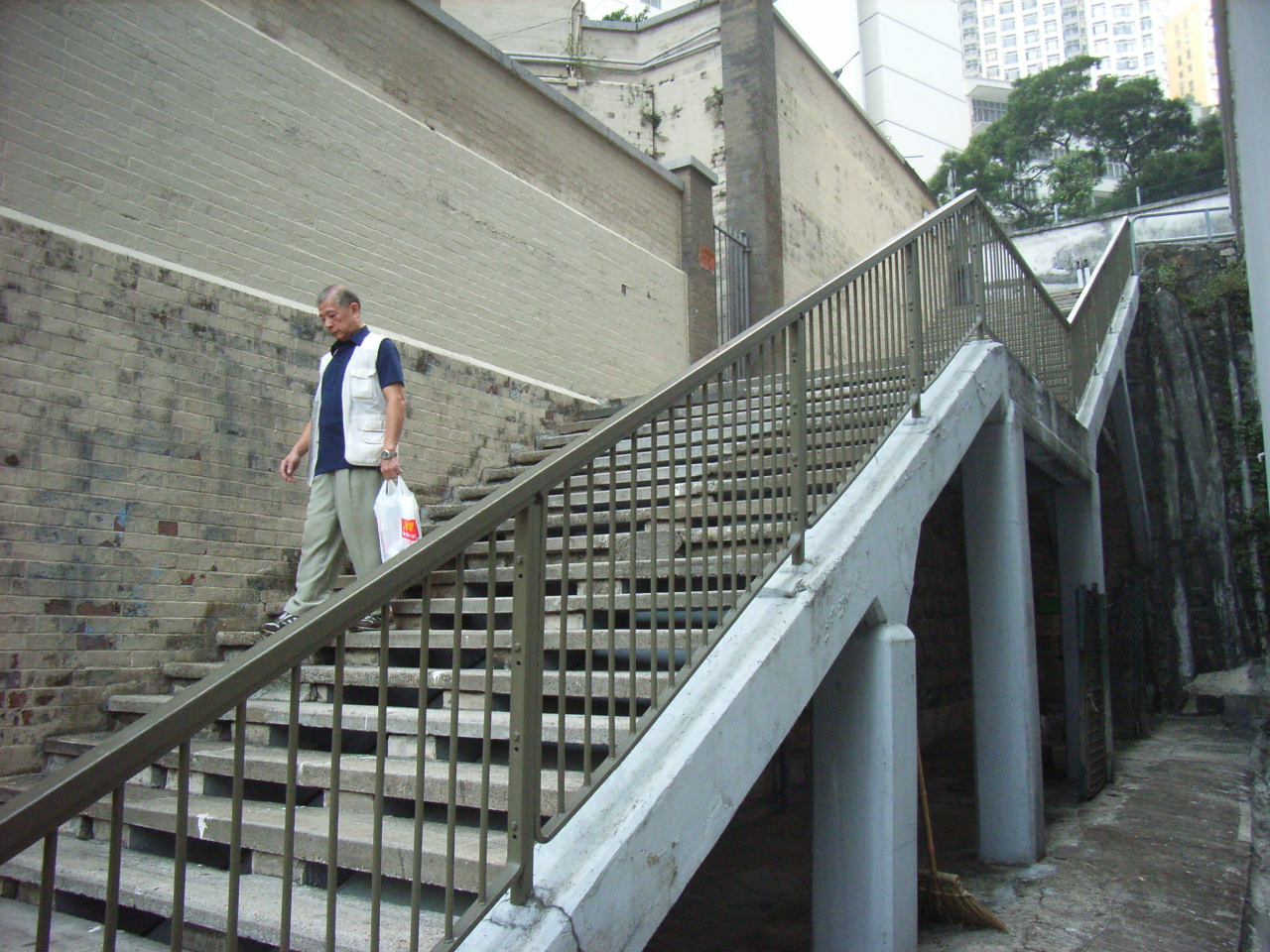
Pound Ln 2006

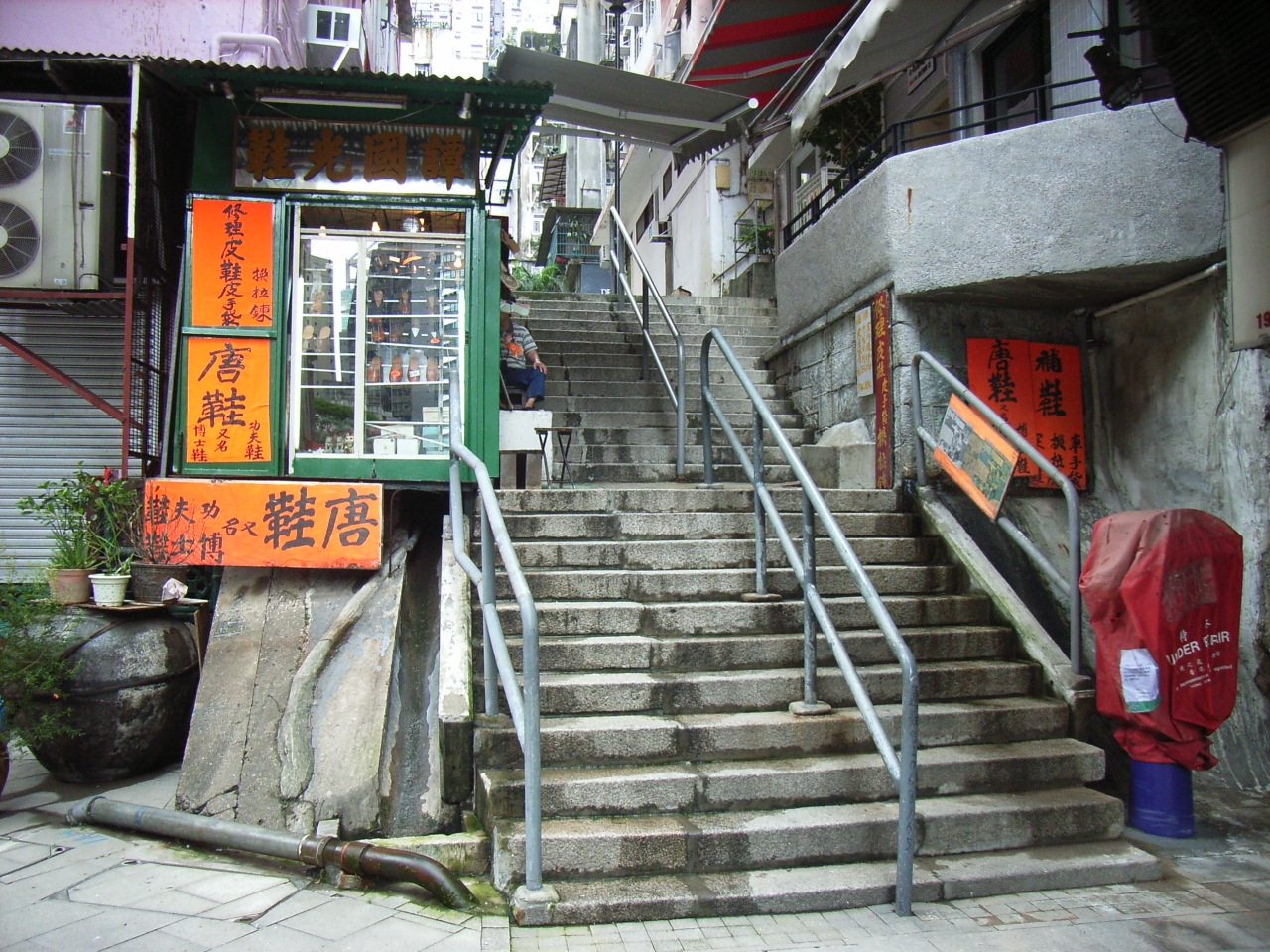
Lane off Hollywood Rd 2006

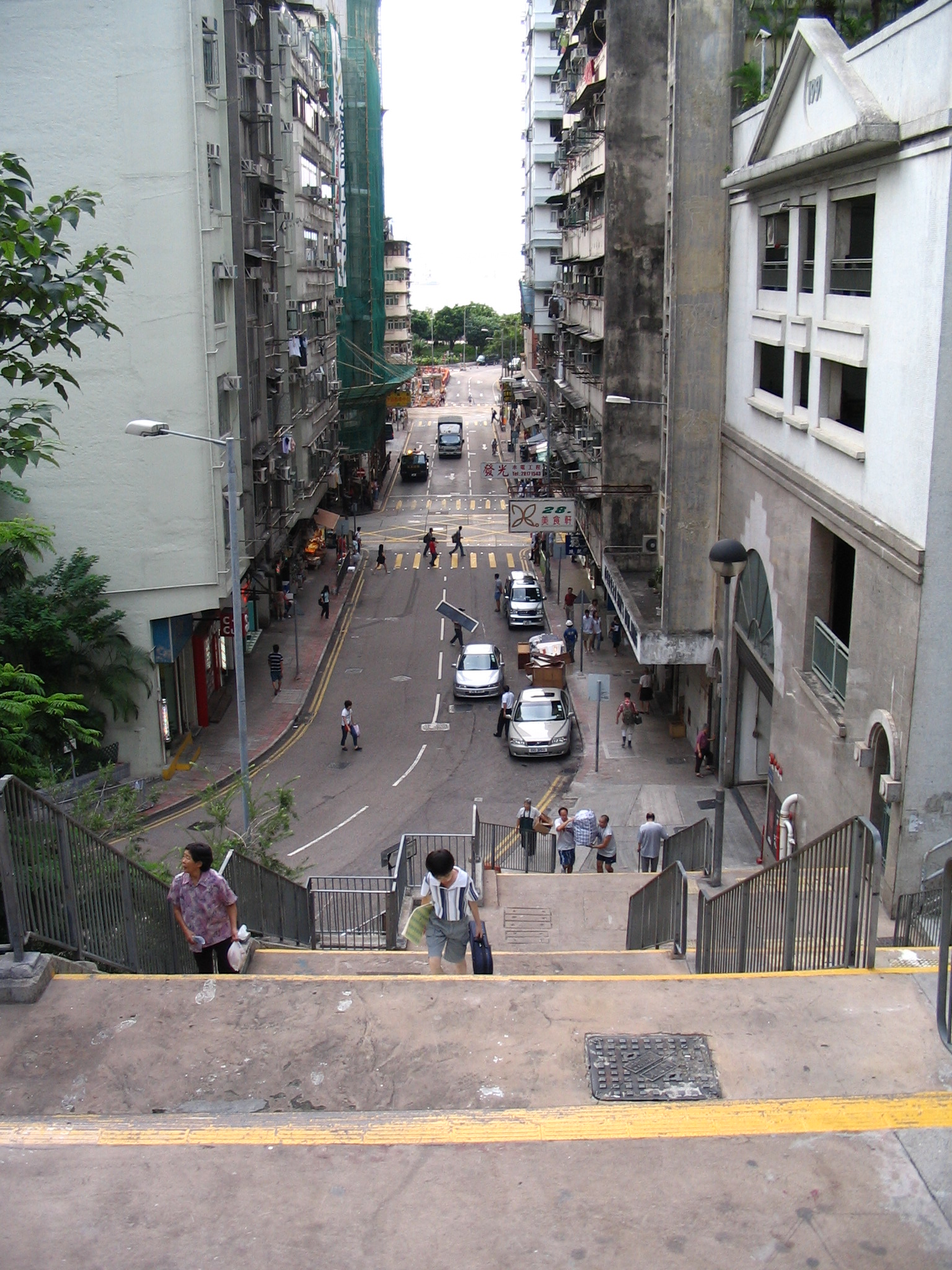
Sands St 2007

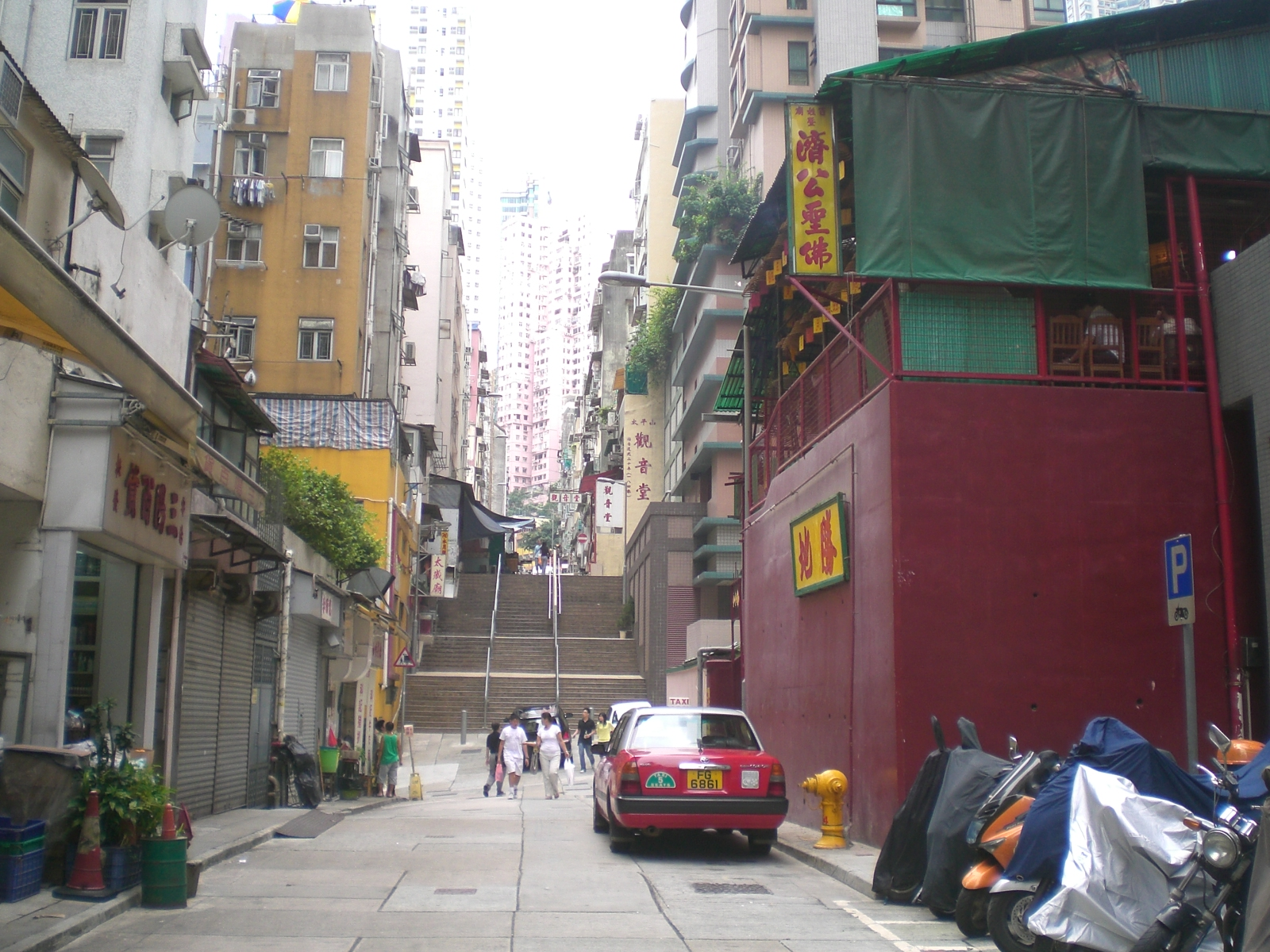
Tai Ping Shan St 2008

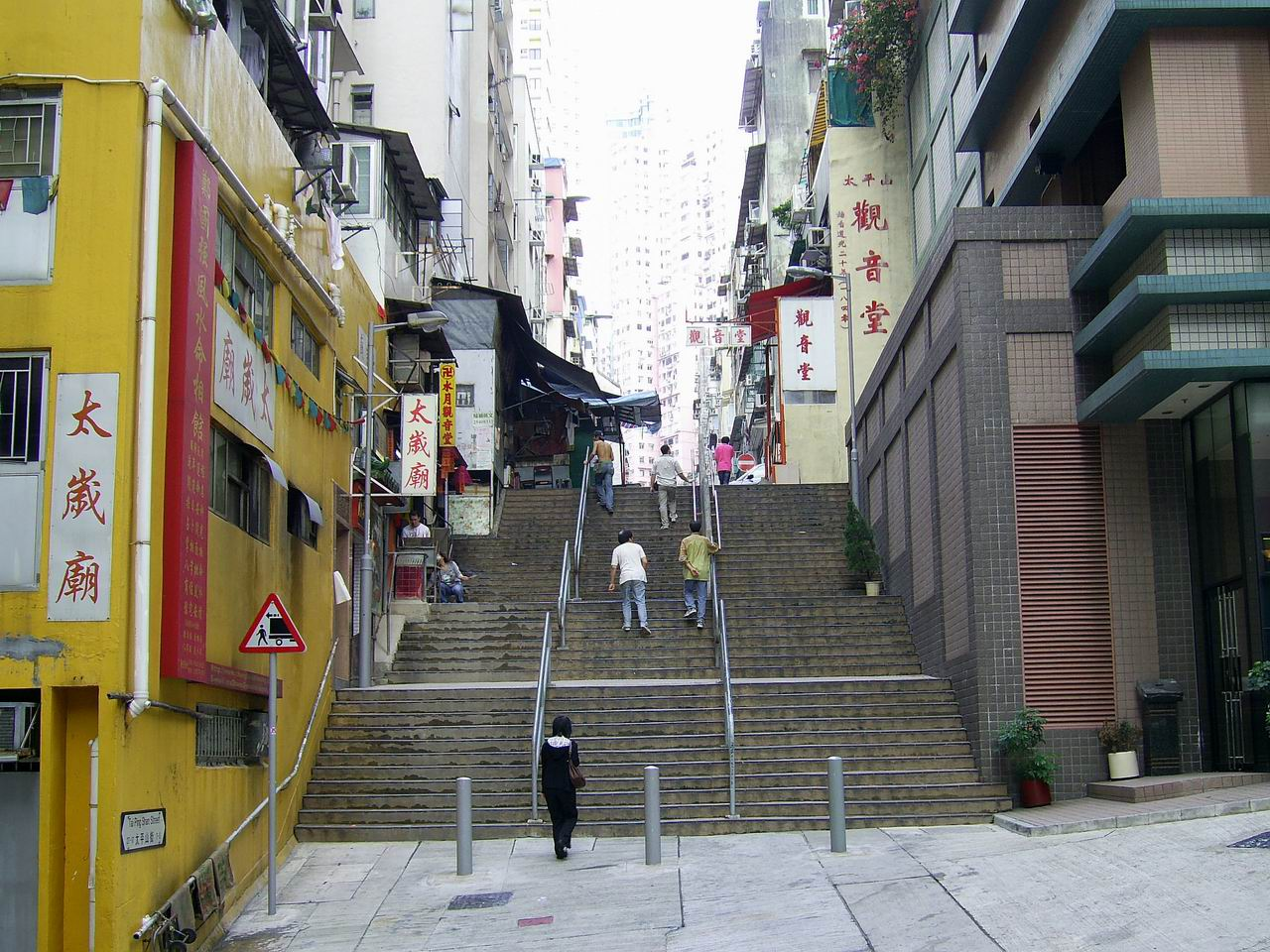
Tai Ping Shan St 2008

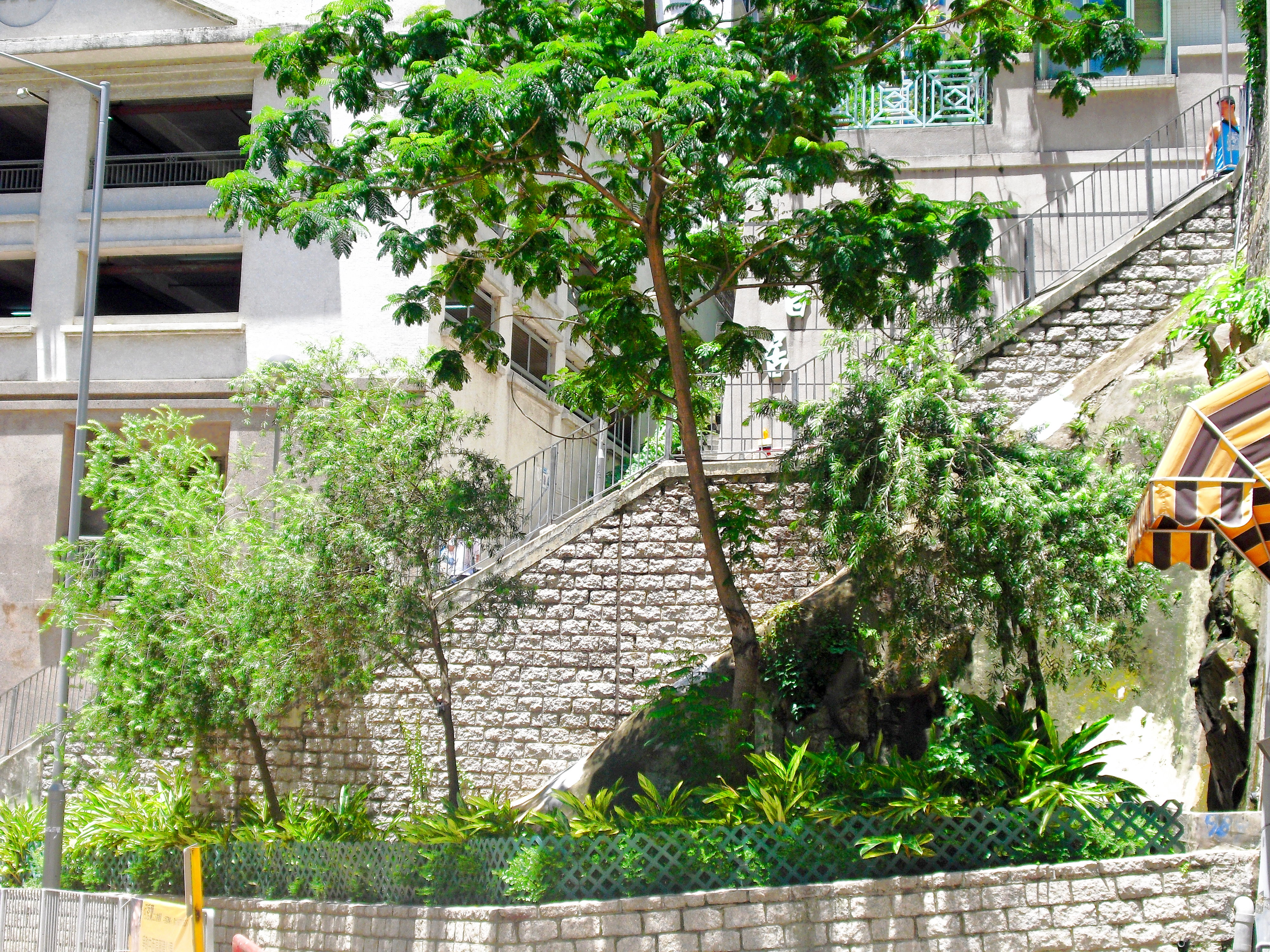
Sands St 2009

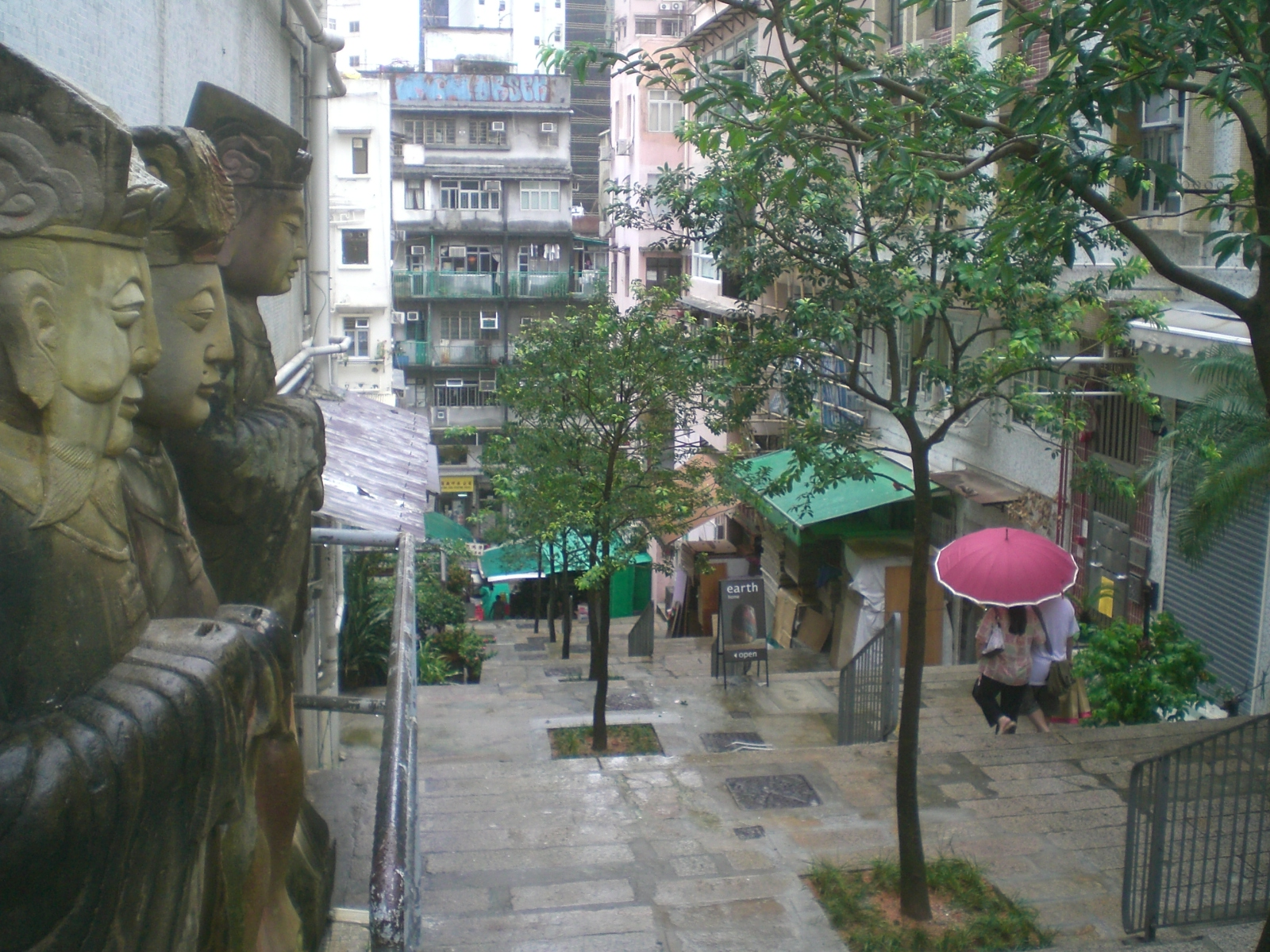
Mee Lun St 2009

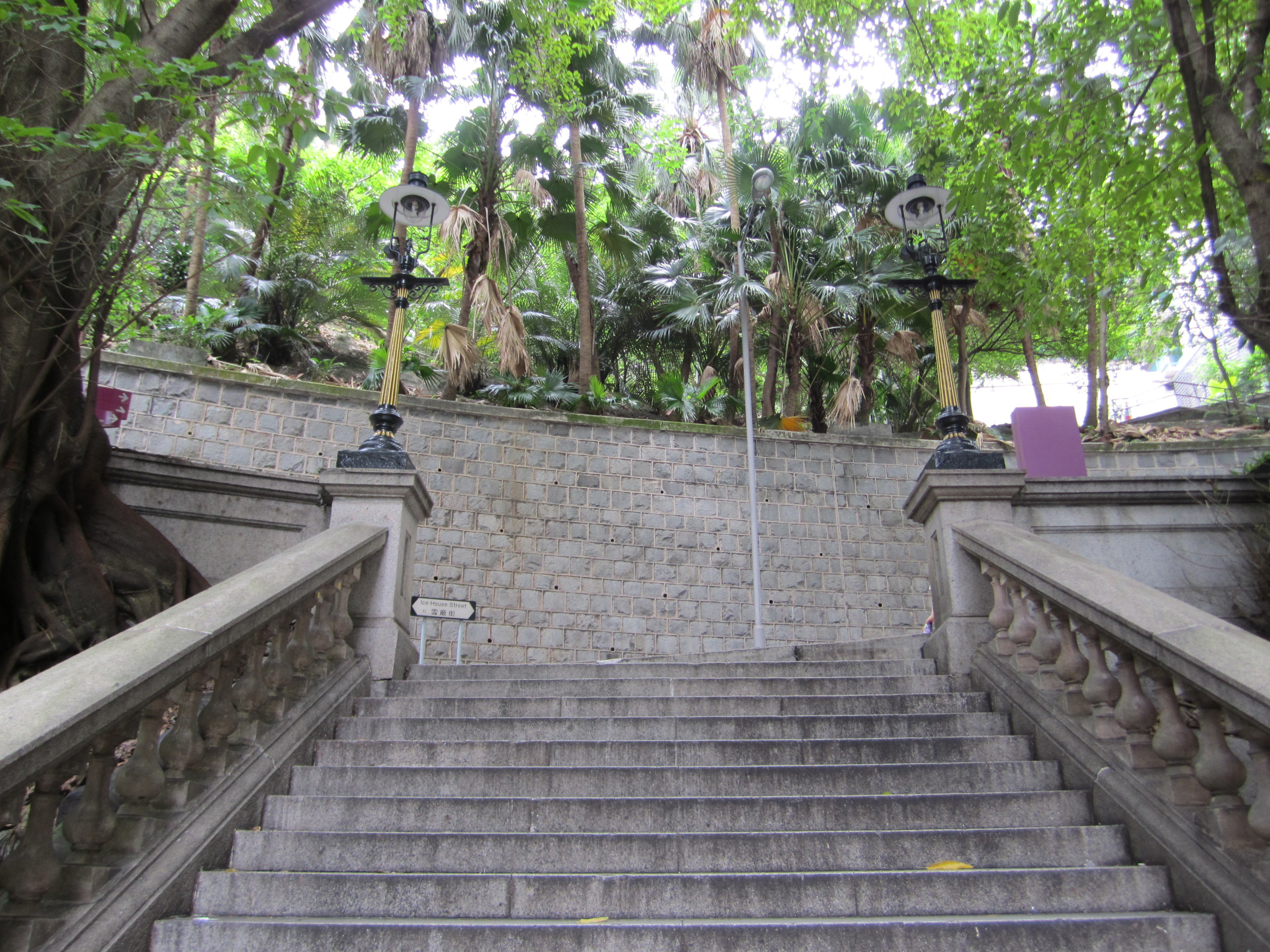
Duddell St 2013

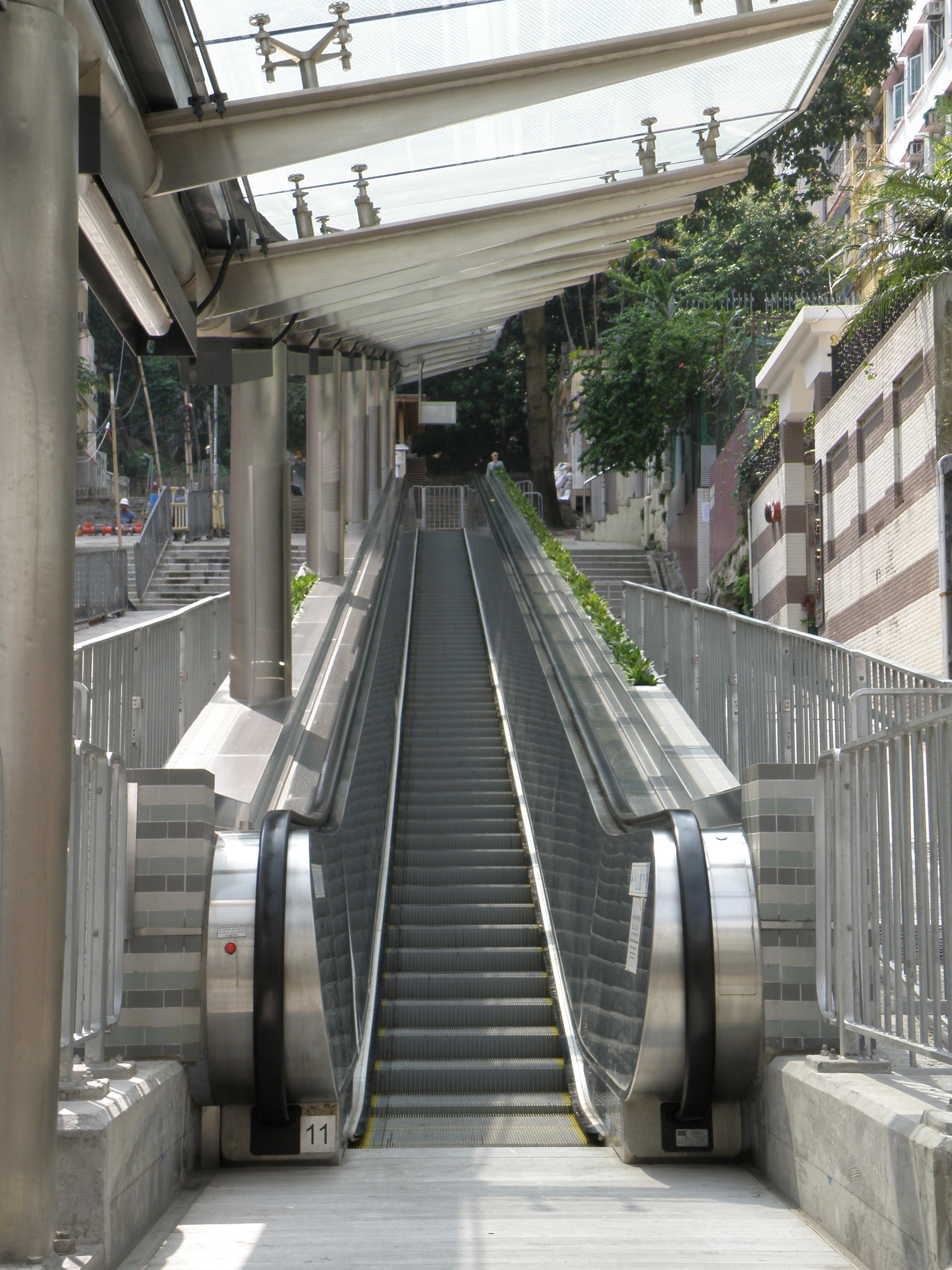
Sands St 2014

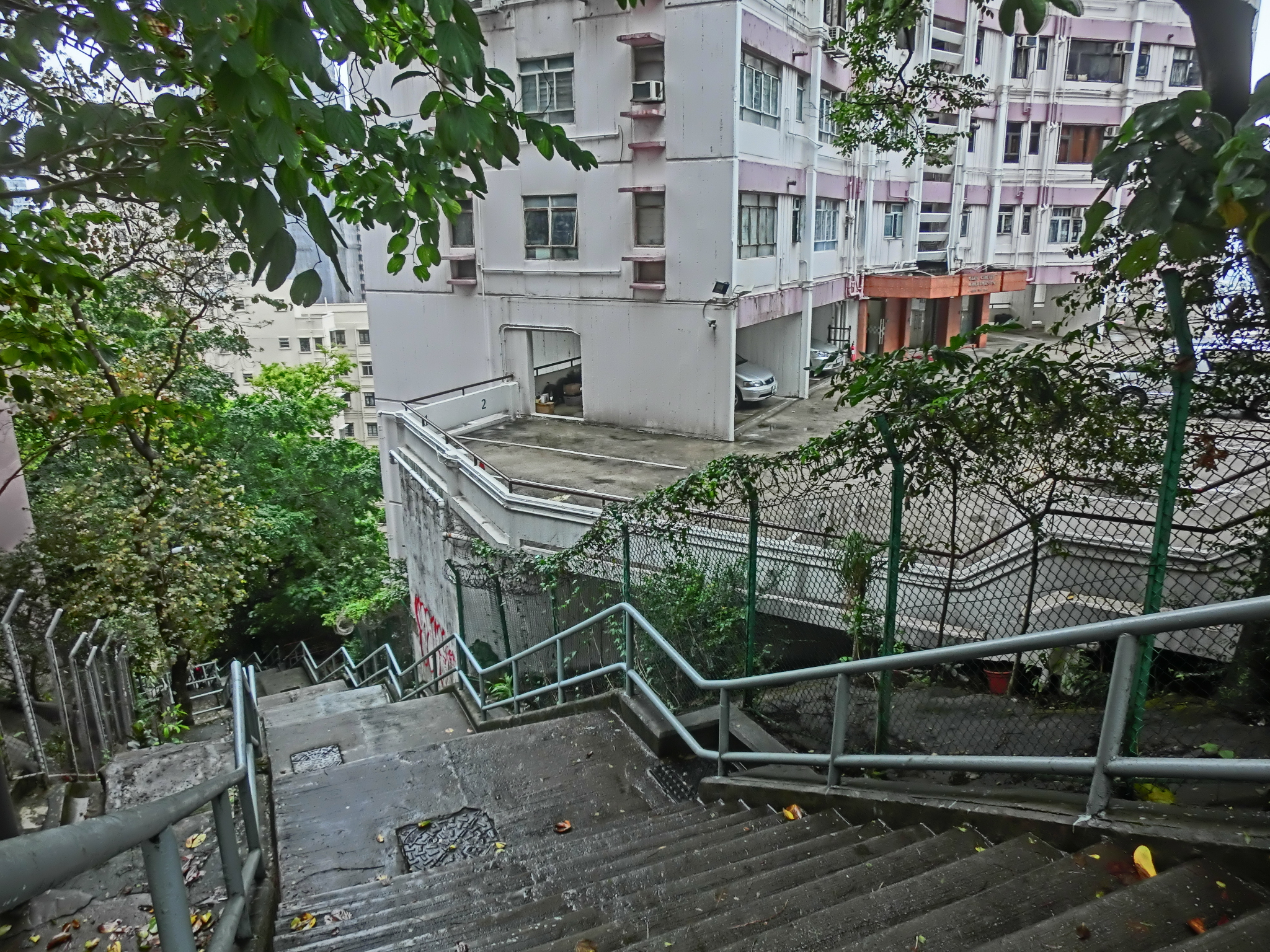
Wan Tin Path 2014

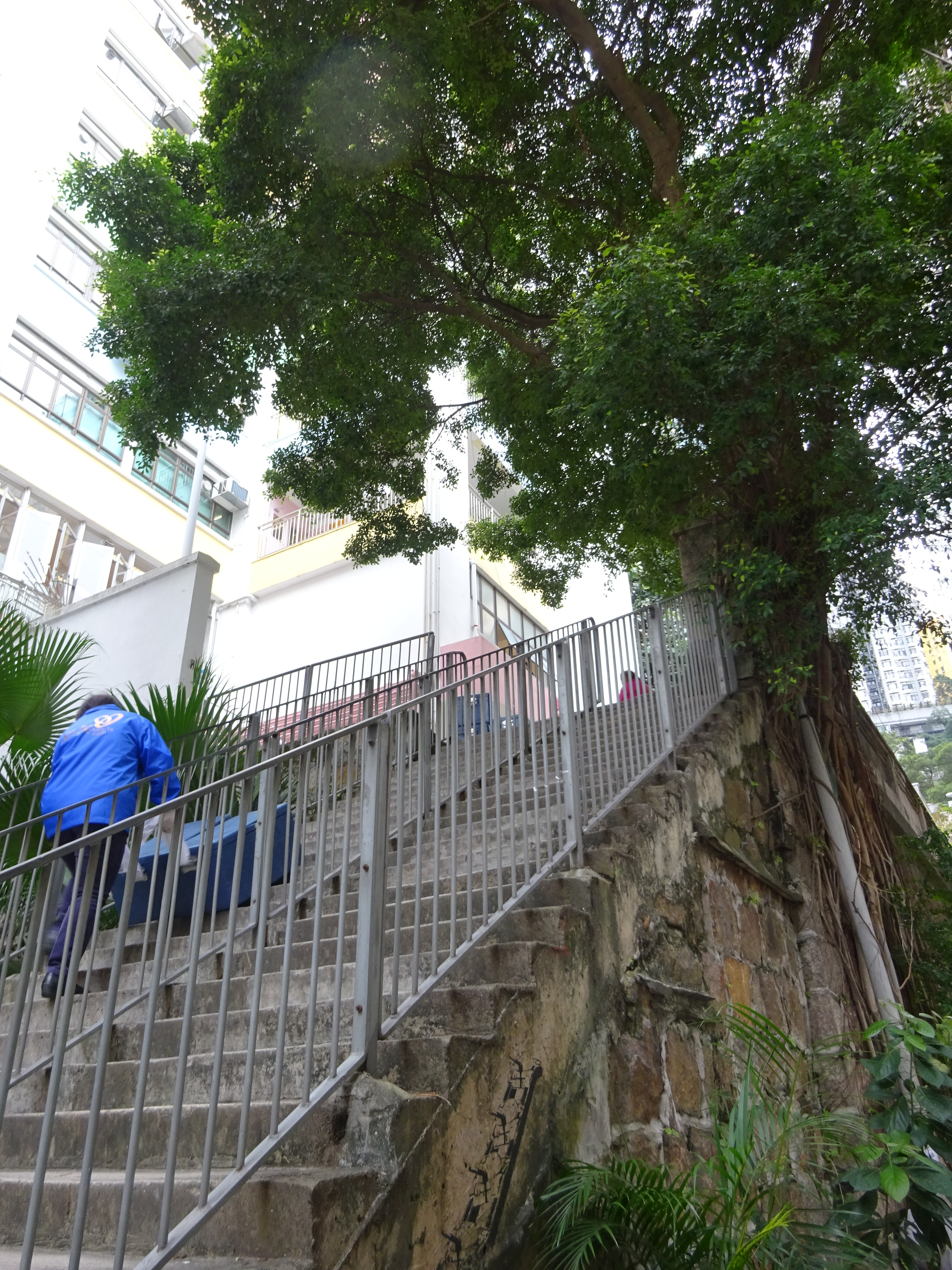
Pound Ln 2016

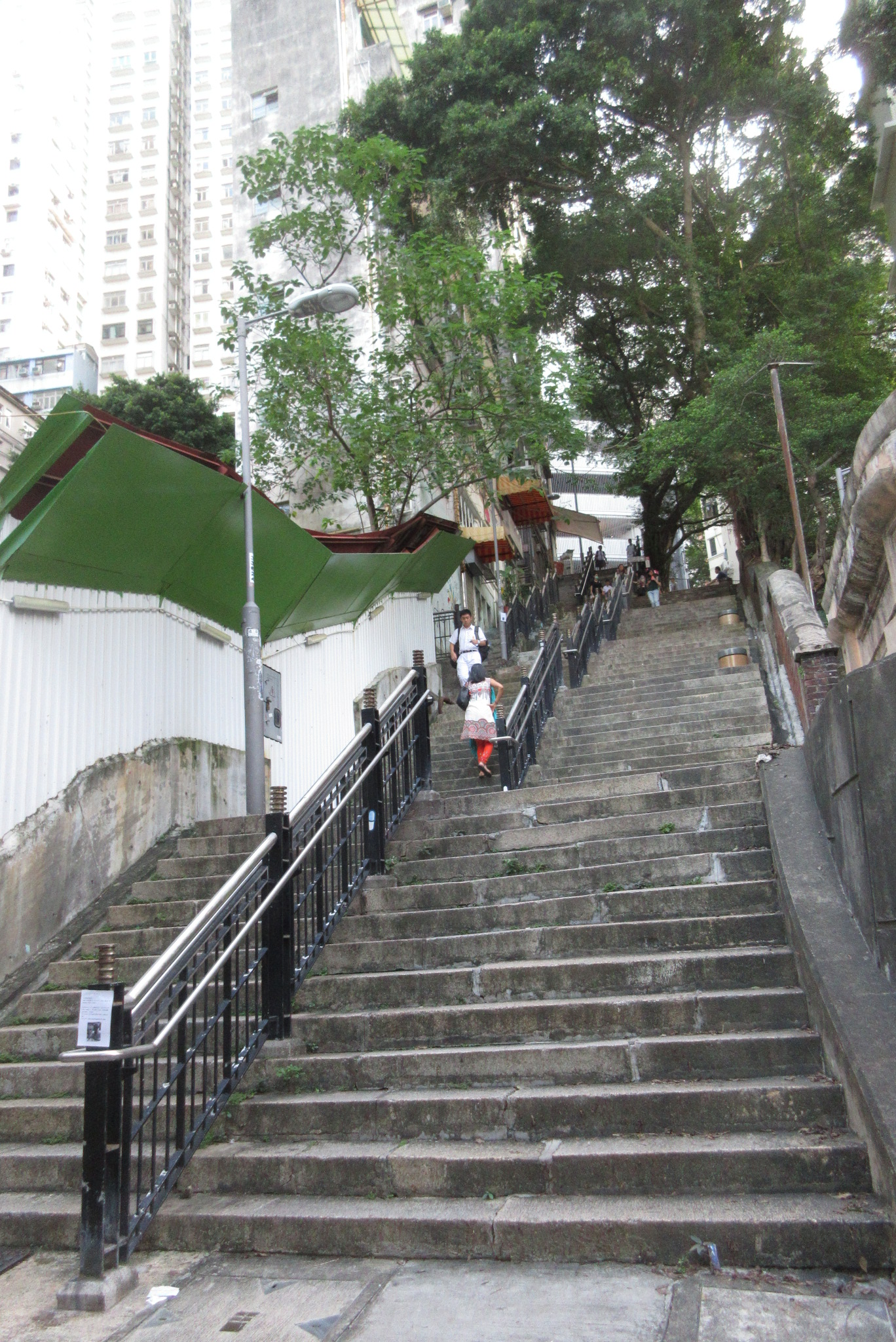
Ladder St 2017

== See also ==
- Central–Mid-Levels escalator
- Step street
