= Bridges Street Market =

Market building in Hong Kong

Coordinates: 22.283324°N 114.150959°E

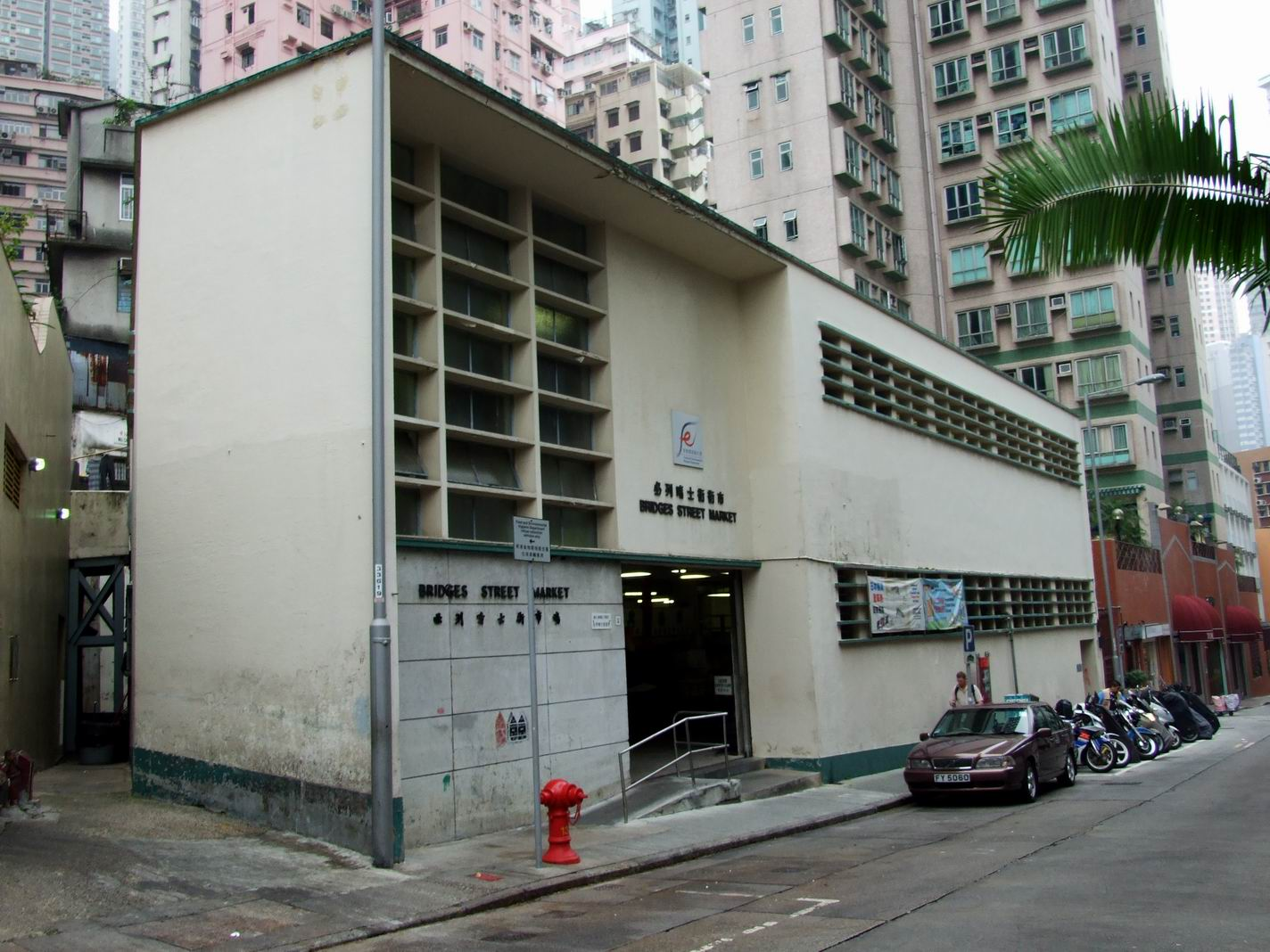
Bridges Street Market in 2008.

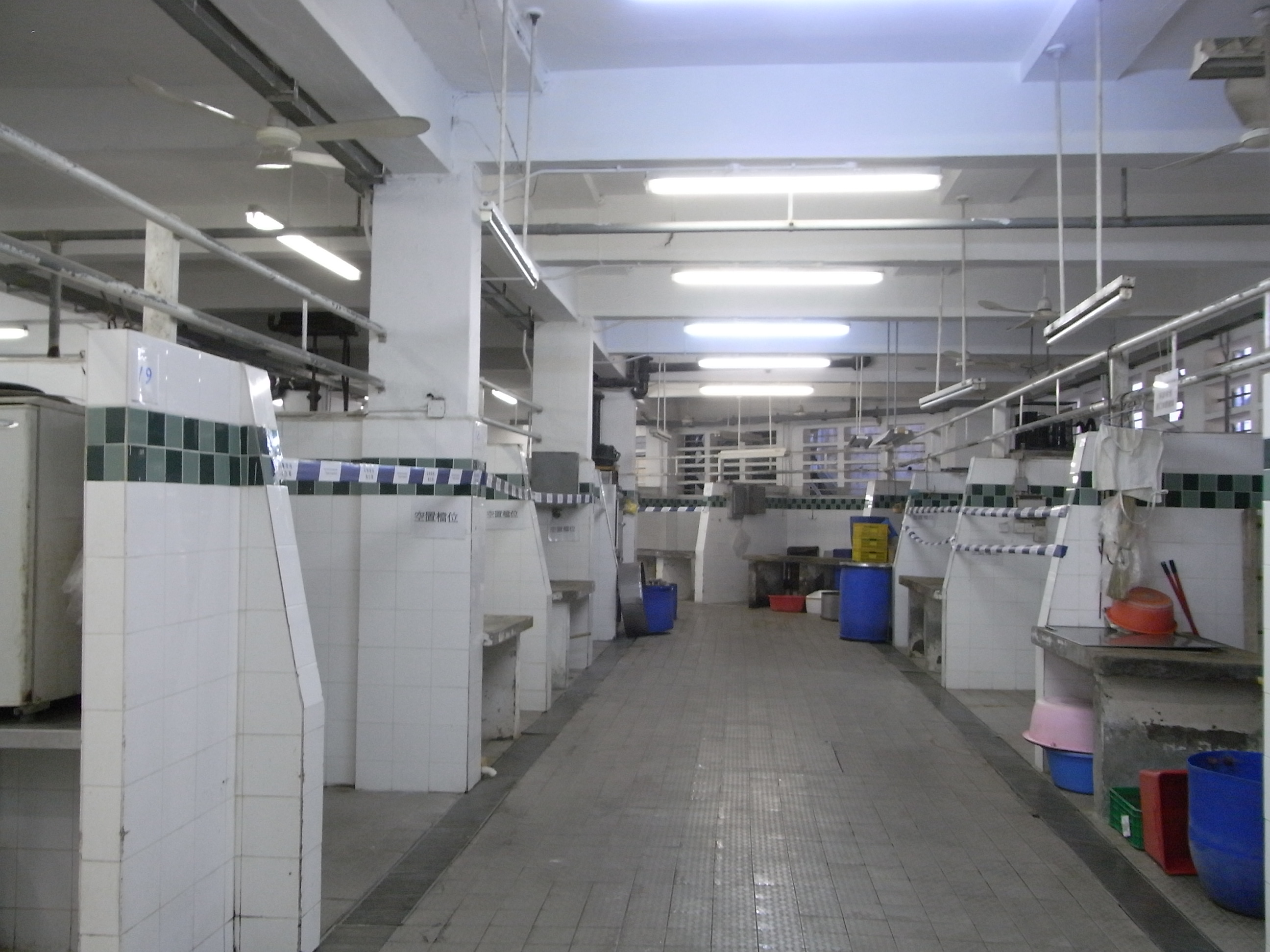
Bridges Street Market interior in 2010.

Bridges Street Market (Chinese: 必列啫士街街市) is located at No. 2 Bridges Street, at the corner of Shing Wong Street, in Sheung Wan, Hong Kong. It is a Bauhaus style market building, originally opened in 1953, and has been renovated and open in 2018 as a news museum.

== History ==
Bridges Street Market was partly built on the site of the former American Congregational Mission (presently the China Congregational Church) w Preaching House at which Dr Sun Yat-Sen was baptised into Christianity and given the name "Yat-sun" in 1883. The name was later changed to "Yat-sen". Dr Sun Yat-Sen has also lived on the third floor of the building in 1884-1886 during his time studying in Central School.

In 1901, the church was relocated to No. 68 Bridges Street.

After the Japanese Occupation of Hong Kong, the Urban Council built a new building, to replace the old market destroyed during the war. The new market was opened in 1953. In 1969, part of the first floor was repurposed and converted into an indoor children's playground, with two bridges constructed to connect the area to the adjacent Wing Lee Street.The market contained 26 stalls for selling fish and poultry on the ground floor and 33 stalls on the 1st floor mostly selling beef, pork, fruits and vegetables.

== Conservation ==
Bridges Street Market is part of the Central and Western Heritage Trail and the Dr Sun Yat-sen Historical Trail. It was listed as a Grade III historic building in 2011.

== See also ==
- Hong Kong News-Expo
