= Wing Lee Street =

Street in Hong Kong

Coordinates: 22°16′59.8″N 114°9′1.3″E

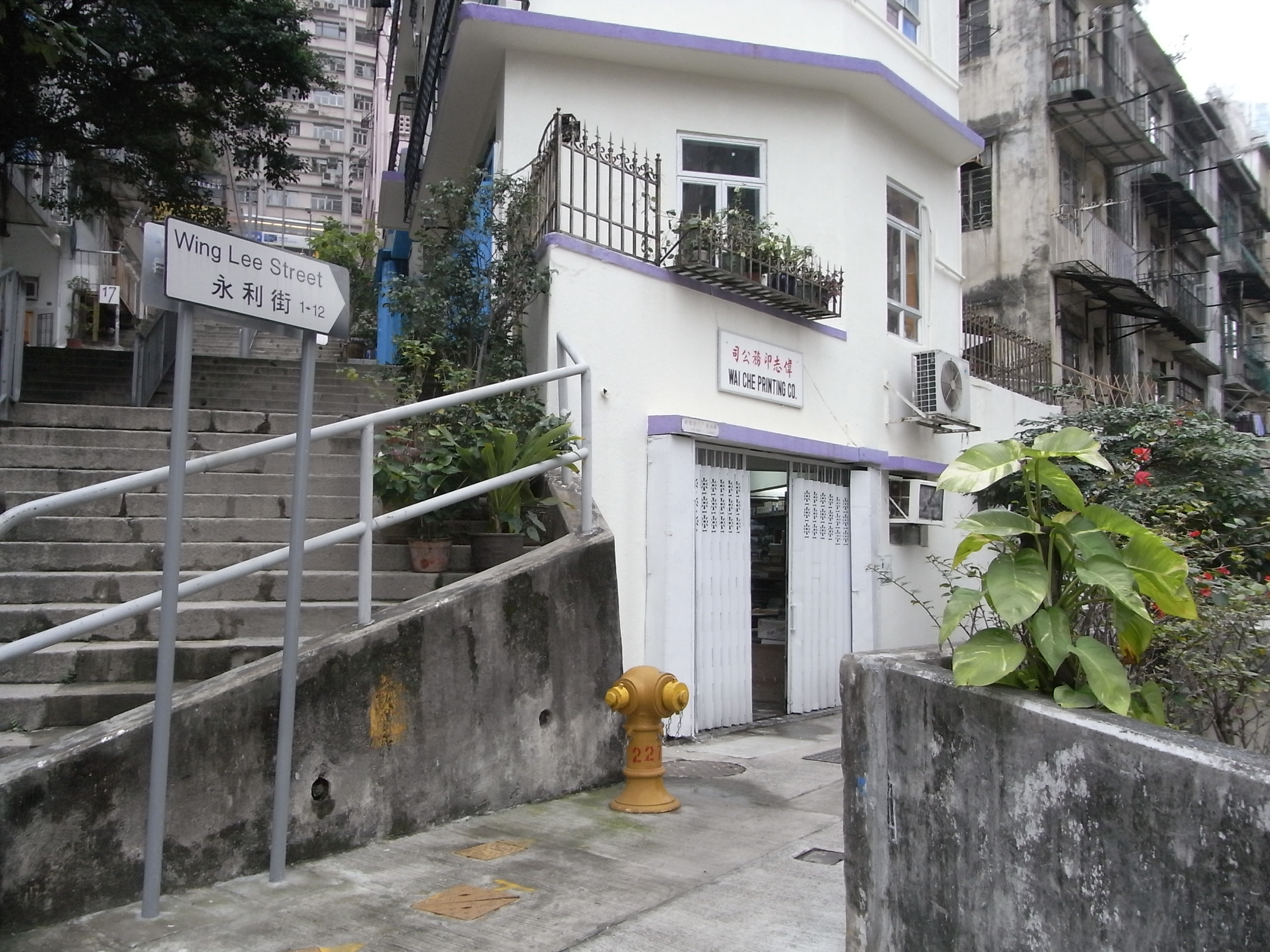
Wing Lee Street.

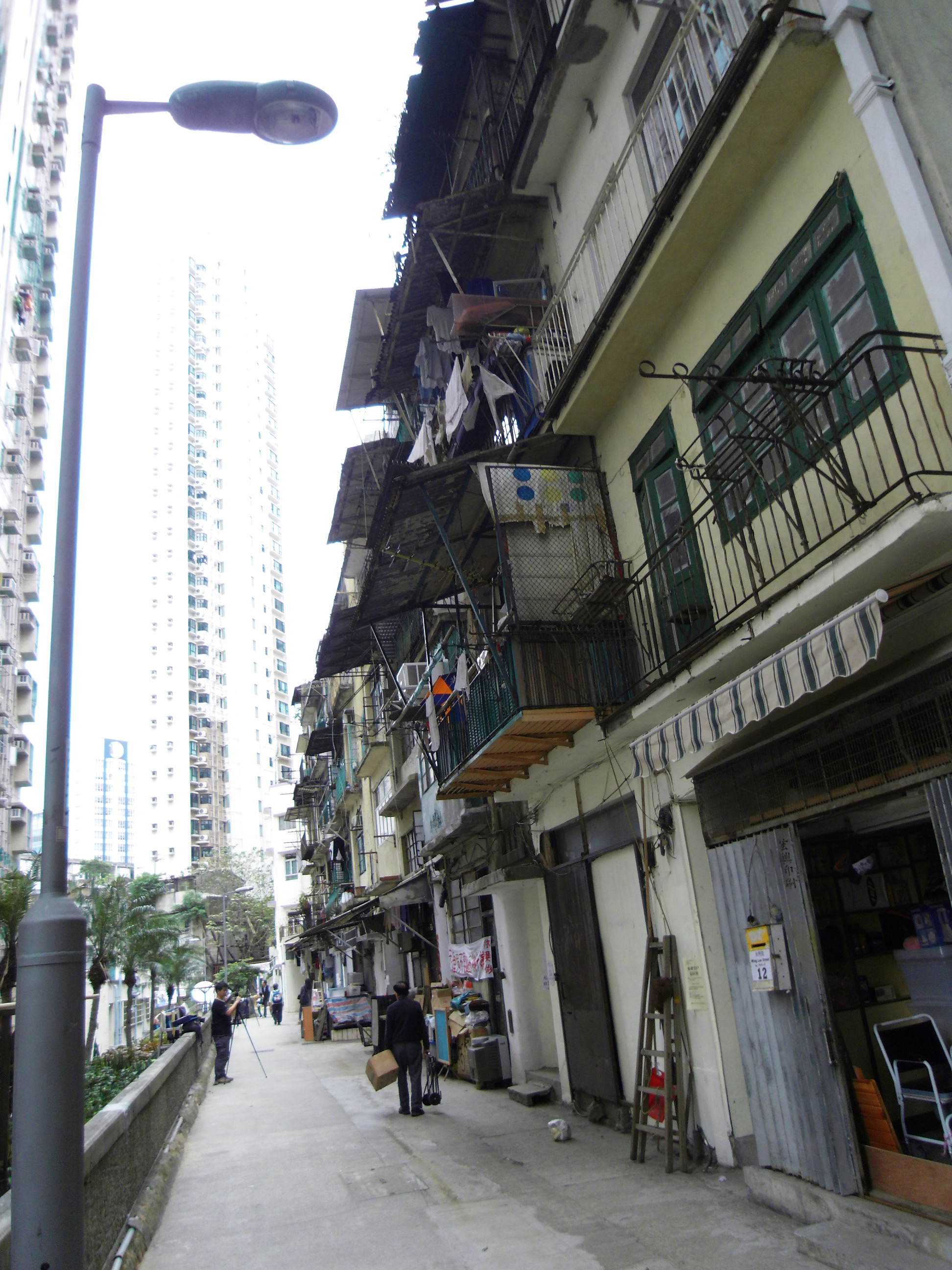
Wing Lee Street.

Wing Lee Street (Chinese: 永利街) is a street in Hong Kong. It is located in Sheung Wan near Shing Wong Street, Bridges Street, Ladder Street and the Former Hollywood Road Police Married Quarters.

== Cancelled redevelopment plan ==
Wing Lee Street contains several old (to Hong Kong standards) Hong Kong 1960s buildings. The street has been described as "the seediest street in Hong Kong" and the Urban Renewal Authority (URA) planned to redevelop Wing Lee Street with Staunton Street as H19 project. But after Echoes of the Rainbow was filmed at this street and won the Crystal Bear for the Best Film in the Children's Jury "Generation Kplus" category at the 2010 Berlin Film Festival, the redevelopment plan was scrapped.

Tenants living in Wing Lee blocks lost their right for compensation and resettlement, as the area is now outside URA's redevelopment area. The URA, however, decided to help tenants by providing renovation subsidies and offering resettlement.

The URA also invited owners of other unsold block who claimed that they were committed to preservation to renovate their properties. The URA also offered to provide subsidy. However, none of the owners responded and left their blocks unmaintained.

The URA renovated four acquired blocks and invited the University of Hong Kong, Hong Kong Youth Federation and Hong Kong Arts Centre to make better use of the blocks.
