= Ted Hui =

Hong Kong politician (born 1982)

Ted Hui Chi-fung
- 許智峯
- Hui in 2026

Member of the Legislative Council
- In office 1 October 2016 – 12 November 2020
- Preceded by: Sin Chung-kai
- Succeeded by: Constituency abolished
- Constituency: Hong Kong Island

Member of the Central and Western District Council
- In office 1 January 2012 – 28 May 2021
- Preceded by: Yuen Bun-keung
- Constituency: Chung Wan

Personal details
- Born: 8 June 1982 (age 44) British Hong Kong
- Party: Liberal Party of Australia (2024–present); Democratic Party (Hong Kong) (until 2020)
- Education: City University of Hong Kong (LLB)
- Occupation: Lawyer

Ted Hui Chi-fung
- Traditional Chinese: 許智峯
- Simplified Chinese: 许智峰
Transcriptions
Standard Mandarin
- Hanyu Pinyin: Xǔ Zhìfēng
Yue: Cantonese
- Jyutping: heoi2 zi3 fung1

Ted Hui Chi-fung (Chinese: 許智峯; born 8 June 1982) is a Hong Kong politician. He formerly represented the Chung Wan constituency in the Central and Western District Council, and was a Legislative Councillor for the Hong Kong Island constituency. Fearing prosecution by the Government of Hong Kong, he announced his self-exile in Denmark and withdrawal from the Democratic Party in December 2020.

== Personal life and education ==
Hui was born in Hong Kong and raised in Tuen Mun. He received his education in Canada and Hong Kong. In 2006, Hui earned his bachelor's degree in law with honours from the City University of Hong Kong.

Hui has blogged about his two children, and promoted family-friendly policies.

== Politics ==
=== Early career ===
In the 2011 District Council elections, Hui successfully succeeded veteran Yuen Bun-keung's Central and Western District Council seat in the Chung Wan constituency which covers the Central area. He was elected a lawmaker for the Hong Kong Island constituency in 2016.

Hui first caught media attention for his protests in the council. In 2014, he was ejected from a meeting of the council's working group on civic education when protesting the council's decision to grant HK$150,000 (of a HK$250,000 total grant) to pro-Beijing groups. Hui complained that there was a conflict of interest because several of the councillors were members of or advisers to the recipients. In the process of ejection, he was injured by council security personnel, resulting in his party's demand for an apology from the district office.

In the Democratic Party's intra-party primary for candidacy in Hong Kong Island in the 2016 Legislative Council Elections, Hui won against Wilfred Chong Wing-fai and officially assumed office on 1 October 2016.

Hui was considered to be quite radical within the Democratic Party. He opposed the party's meetings with Beijing officials. In 2015, when the party's central committee member Wong Sing-chi publicly called on pan-democrats to back Beijing's restrictive reform model for the 2017 Chief Executive election, Hui led a call for the party to investigate whether Wong had violated any of its internal rules. Wong was expelled from the party.

Hui has been vocal on environmental issues, education, human rights and democracy. He played a major role in pushing for the banning of ivory trade in Hong Kong in 2018. Hui showed high concern about the erosion of freedoms in Hong Kong and called for the international community to speak up for Hong Kong.

=== 2019 Hong Kong local elections ===
On 4 October 2019, Hui submitted his nomination to run for the 2019 Hong Kong local elections in the A01 Central District. Hui won with 1618 votes, 299 votes more than the 1319 votes achieved by his opponent, Karen Wong.

In April 2018, Hui was under police investigation for snatching a Security Bureau executive officer's phone and taking it to a Legislative Council Complex toilet on 24 April 2018. The Democratic Party suspended the lawmaker and criticized him for seriously tarnishing the reputation of lawmakers. Hui later apologized to the executive officer and admitted that his action was "not appropriate". Hui, however, claimed that the employee had been "recording the entry and exit time of lawmakers", including himself, into a meeting room and the Legco complex. He alleged that there was a breach of the privacy ordinance. Hui was charged with three offences, including common assault, dishonest access to a computer and obstructing a public officer in the execution of their duties. Hui pleaded not guilty to all three charges. In May 2019, Hui was found guilty of one count of common assault on a senior executive officer. In July 2020, Hui faces a censure motion at the Legislative Council for phone snatching.

On 28 May 2020, Hui disrupted the second reading of the National Anthem Bill in the Legislative Council by dropping a container containing rotten plant matter inside the chamber. A fellow lawmaker was taken to hospital after being exposed to the smell. On 4 June 2020, Hui and two other lawmakers, Eddie Chu and Raymond Chan, were charged with hindering the business of the Legislative Council and violating the Powers and Privileges Ordinance, with Hui having dropped foul-smelling liquid during the LegCo session on that day. Hui was subsequently fined HK$52,000.

=== 2020 New Year's Day protest ===
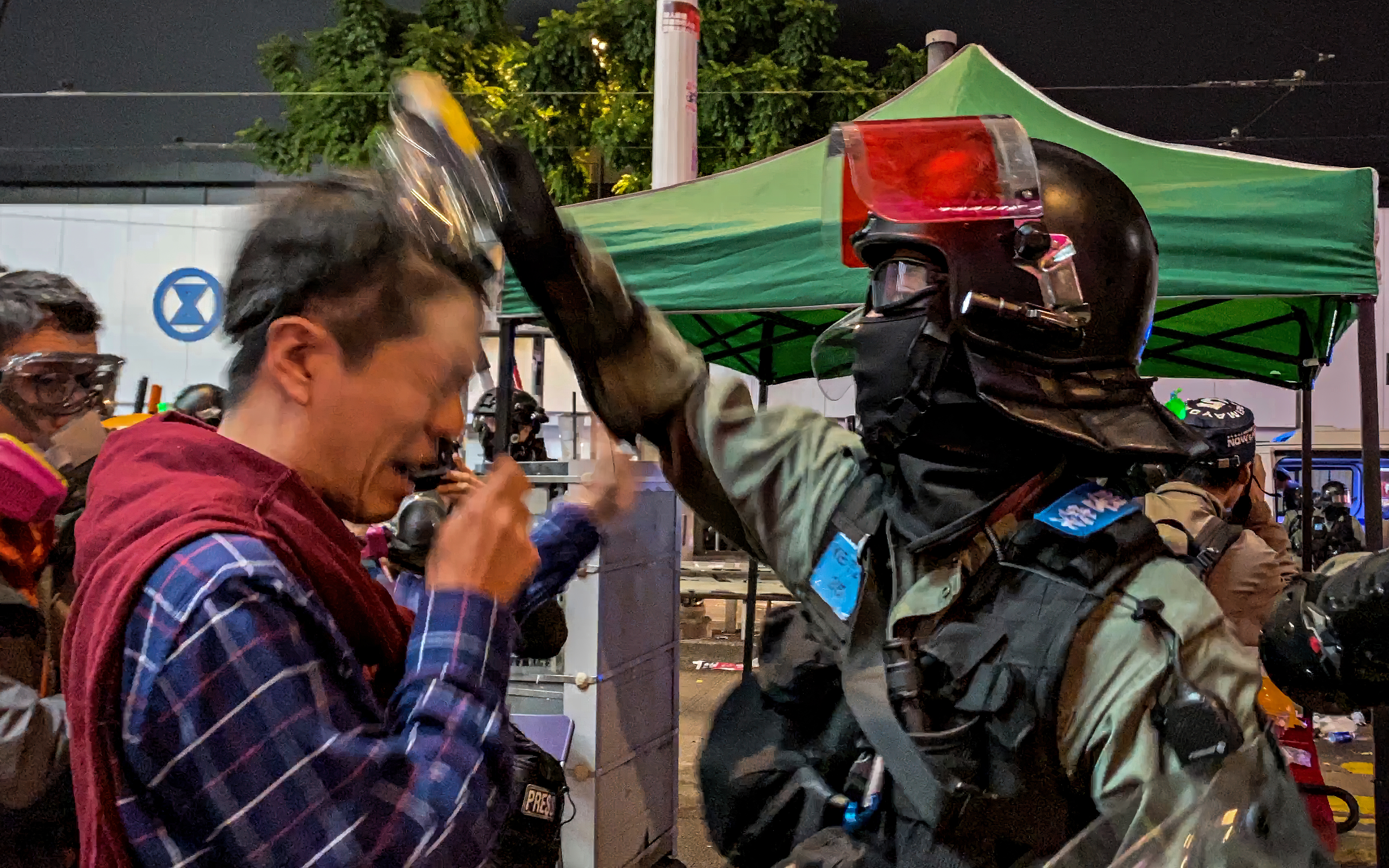
Riot police officer holding pepper spray and pointing it at Ted Hui at close range

The Civil Human Rights Front (CHRF), during its campaign against Anti-Extradition Law Amendment Bill, organized a New Year's Day march on 1 January 2020, in which CHRF said more than 1.03 million citizens participated. At around 7:00 pm, police water cannon trucks fired water cannons in Causeway Bay, and raised black warning flags and fired tear gas in Yee Wo Street. Hui was in the middle of a line between reporters and the police, trying to intervene as police officers were rounding up nearly 100 protesters on neighbouring Hennessy Road. As Hui called on to police to remain calm, a riot police officer pointed a pepper spray bottle at him at close range, and knocked off the protective goggles that Hui was wearing. Hui retreated and put on his goggles again, upon which the officer knocked it off a second time and sprayed Hui into the face. At a press conference on 2 January, police public relations staff Kelvin Kong Wing-cheung defended the officer's action by saying that Hui had not stayed on the pavement – a claim that was questioned due to video footage to the contrary –, and had displayed "passive resistance" and kept on arguing after having been warned by the officer that pepper spray was to be used.

=== Private criminal prosecution against officer Kwan Ka-wing ===
On 23 January 2020, Hui filed a private criminal prosecution against traffic police officer Kwan Ka-wing, who shot at an unarmed teenage protester (who has since has been prosecuted for assaulting a Police Officer and rioting) in Sai Wan Ho, charging him with either "attempted murder" or "shooting with intent to cause grievous bodily harm". On 18 August 2020, seven months after the private prosecution of the case was initiated, the Legislative Council Member who initiated the private prosecution revealed that he had been informed by the Department of Justice that the Secretary of Justice, Teresa Cheng, had decided to intervene in the case, and that the accuser would apply to withdraw the summons, apply to the court for a trial between 20 and 28 August, and request a waiver for the traffic police to appear in court. In addition, he also questioned the Department of Justice's decision to shield the defendant and the common law right of the public to bring a private prosecution. Finally, Hui said that he would discuss with his legal team and did not rule out the possibility of filing a judicial review in the near future.

=== Lawsuit against the use of tear gas by police ===
On 18 January 2020, Hui filed a lawsuit against the High Court, asking the police to disclose the ingredients of the tear gas and the possible chemicals that could be released. Hui said the police had been using "tear gas grenades" for the past six months, and the public was very worried about the damage to their health, but the police and the government refused to disclose the ingredients.

=== Suspected Ta Kung Pao reporter stalking incident ===
On 14 August 2020, Hui said on social media that he was followed by a mysterious car with license plate WW5399 for several days. As Hui questioned the occupants of the car about their identity, they started the car, injuring Hui slightly. Arriving police did not search the car, nor stop it from leaving; it instead tackled Hui to the ground after he tried to stop the car himself. It was later reported that the persons who followed Hui were two reporters from Ta Kung Pao, a pro-Beijing newspaper. Some netizens also identified the reporter as a male reporter surnamed Lo from Ta Kung Pao who had been involved in a fight with activist Edward Leung at Tai Koo station in 2016. Hui rejected the accusations by Ta Kung Pao that he had tried to pull open the car door, and to prevent the car from leaving, as false, adding that he would pursue the matter through legal channels.

=== Arrest, exile and political asylum ===
On 26 August 2020, Hui was arrested on charges related to a protest on 6 July 2019 in Tuen Mun. In response to the disqualification of pro-democratic legislators by the Chinese National People's Congress Standing Committee, he was among the 19 pan-democrats who resigned en masse on 11 November 2020. Hui resigned on 12 November 2020, while other pro-democracy legislators resigned on 30 November 2020.

On the morning of 1 December 2020, he arrived in Denmark with the help of a group of Danish parliamentarians. On 3 December 2020, he announced that he was seeking political asylum in the United Kingdom and quit the Democratic Party. He said he was facing nine charges in Hong Kong and he would achieve the mission to widen Hong Kong's international battle front. He arrived at London, United Kingdom on 5 December. As of 4 December 2020, Hui had not returned to Hong Kong; the HK Police in response considered him to have jumped bail and put him on the wanted persons list. As a result of his applying for political asylum and allegedly using false pretences to secure permission to travel to Denmark, at least five of his Hong Kong bank and credit card accounts belonging to him, his wife, and parents have been frozen, including accounts at HSBC, Hang Seng Bank and Bank of China. Hui has attacked HSBC for this, and has called for MPs in Britain to act against the bank. He has described the freeze as "a political one, taken out of HSBC’s own political considerations, with a view to aiding the regime in cracking down on opposition voices." HSBC responded by the CEO Noel Quinn informing him that it was "not able to operate" his bank and credit card accounts and "had no choice" as it was legally obliged to take action following the police notification. Hui has made numerous claims to the British Parliament regarding his bank and credit card accounts, and has posted on his Facebook page "Any banks, businesses or organisations helping the communist tyranny to suppress the freedom of Hong Kong people will inevitably pay a heavy price internationally," he said. "I will do everything I can to make these organisations face the consequences."

Hui arrived in Australia on 9 March 2021, citing as reason for his relocation the attempt to expand international lobbying efforts. The Hong Kong government told Hong Kong Free Press that it would "track down" fugitives, in an apparent reference to Hui.

On 29 November 2021, authorities of Hong Kong issued arrest warrants for both Hui and Yau Man-chun, former district councilor, over their incitement to boycott or to cast invalid ballots at the 2021 Hong Kong legislative election. Press releases and newspaper reports indicated that as of July 2022, at least a dozen people had been arrested over Hui's message calling to submit a blank vote.

On 2 June 2022, Hui, who was absent at the trial, was found guilty of contempt of court for his travel to Denmark on a pretext. On 29 September, Hui was sentenced in absentia to three and a half years in prison on four counts of contempt of court, and for alleged misconduct in the Legislative Council. After his departure from Hong Kong, Hui was also charged with secession and collusion with foreign forces.

In August 2023, Hui was admitted to South Australia's Supreme Court as a solicitor. He was formally granted asylum by Australia in August 2025.

== See also ==
- Controversies of the Hong Kong Police Force

Political offices
Preceded by Yuen Bun-keung	Member of Central and Western District Council; Representative for Chung Wan; 2012–2021	Vacant
Legislative Council of Hong Kong
Preceded by Sin Chung-kai	Member of Legislative Council; Representative for Hong Kong Island; 2016–2020	Constituency abolished
