= Chung Wan (constituency) =

Former Hong Kong constituency

- Former elected constituency for the Central & Western District Council
- Boundary of Chung Wan in Central & Western District
- District: Central & Western
- Legislative Council constituency: Hong Kong Island West
- Population: 13,351 (2019)
- Electorate: 4,377 (2019)

Former constituency
- Created: 1982
- Abolished: 2023
- Number of members: One

Chung Wan (Chinese: 中環) was one of the 15 constituencies in the Central and Western District of Hong Kong, returned one district councillor to the Central and Western District Council. The constituency was established in 1982 and abolished in 2023.

The constituency loosely covers the Central District with the estimated population of 13,351. "Chung Wan" is both the Cantonese transliteration of the Chinese name and an alternative English name for Central District.

== Boundaries ==
The Chung Wan constituency covers most of Central District and Admiralty, as well as the portion of Sheung Wan east of Cleverly Street and Ladder Street. The Sheung Wan, Central, Hong Kong and Admiralty stations of MTR are within the boundaries of the Chung Wan constituency.

District Council constituencies bordering Chung Wan includes Mid Levels East, Peak, Sheung Wan and Tung Wah within the same district, as well as Tai Fat Hau of Wan Chai District.

== Councillors represented ==
=== 1982–1985 ===
Election	Member	Party
1982	Chow Wai-keung	Nonpartisan→People's Association

=== 1985–1994 ===
Election	First Member	First Party	Second Member	Second Party
1985	Chow Wai-keung	People's Association→HKAS	Gerry Wai Ka-cheung	HKAS
1986 by-election	Yuen Bun-keung	Independent→ADPL	Gerry Wai Ka-cheung	HKAS
1988	Yuen Bun-keung	ADPL→United Democrat	Gerry Wai Ka-cheung	HKAS→United Democrat
1991	Yuen Bun-keung	United Democrat→Democratic	Vivian Chih Wan-wan	LDF/Civic Association

=== 1994–2023 ===
Election	Member	Party	%
1994	Yuen Bun-keung	Democratic	64.90
1999	Yuen Bun-keung	Democratic	68.35
2003	Yuen Bun-keung	Democratic	69.50
2007	Yuen Bun-keung	Democratic	61.64
2011	Hui Chi-fung	Democratic	51.49
2015	Hui Chi-fung	Democratic	53.69
2019	Hui Chi-fung→Vacant (Note: Unseated on 28 May 2021 after fleeing Hong Kong.)	Democratic→Independent	55.09

== Election results ==
=== 2010s ===
Central & Western District Council Election, 2019: Chung Wan
Party	Candidate	Votes	%	±%
Democratic	Hui Chi-fung	1,618	55.09	+1.40
Independent	Wong Chung-wai	1,319	44.91	
Majority		299	10.18	
Turnout		2,947	67.38	
Democratic hold		Swing	N/A	

Central & Western District Council Election, 2015: Chung Wan
Party	Candidate	Votes	%	±%
Democratic	Hui Chi-fung	1,090	53.7	+2.2
Nonpartisan	Vienna Lau Wai-yan	940	46.3	
Majority		150	7.4	–0.8
Turnout		2,043	47.2	
Democratic hold		Swing	N/A	

Central & Western District Council Election, 2011: Chung Wan
Party	Candidate	Votes	%	±%
Democratic	Hui Chi-fung	951	51.5	−10.1
Independent	Wai Pui-shuen	800	43.3	N/A
People Power (Power Voters)	So Ho	96	5.2	N/A
Majority		151	8.2	−14.5
Democratic hold		Swing	N/A	

=== 2000s ===
Central & Western District Council Election, 2007: Chung Wan
Party	Candidate	Votes	%	±%
Democratic	Yuen Bun-keung	1,107	61.6	−7.9
DAB	Lee Wai-keung	689	38.9	+7.9
Majority		418	22.7	−7.8
Democratic hold		Swing	-7.8	

Central & Western District Council Election, 2003: Chung Wan
Party	Candidate	Votes	%	±%
Democratic	Yuen Bun-keung	1,481	69.5	+1.2
DAB	Lee Wai-keung	650	30.5	−1.2
Majority		831	39	+3.3
Democratic hold		Swing	+1.2	

=== 1990s ===
Central & Western District Council Election, 1999: Chung Wan
Party	Candidate	Votes	%	±%
Democratic	Yuen Bun-keung	1,179	68.0	+3.5
DAB	Li Man-kuen	546	31.5	N/A
Majority		633	36.5	+6.7
Democratic hold		Swing		

Central & Western District Board Election, 1994: Chung Wan
Party	Candidate	Votes	%	±%
Democratic	Yuen Bun-keung	1,017	64.5	
Independent	Lilianna Au Yim-lung	550	34.9	
Majority		467	29.6	
Democratic hold		Swing		

Central & Western District Board Election, 1991: Chung Wan
Party	Candidate	Votes	%	±%
LDF (Civic)	Vivian Chih Wan-wan	1,438	66.9	
United Democrats	Yuen Bun-keung	1,008	46.9	
United Democrats	Cheng Lai-king	9,55	44.4	
LDF gain from United Democrats		Swing		
United Democrats hold		Swing		

=== 1980s ===
Central & Western District Board Election, 1988: Chung Wan
Party	Candidate	Votes	%	±%
ADPL	Yuen Bun-keung	1,046	69.3	
HKAS	Gerry Wai Ka-cheung	1,002	66.4	
PHKS	Tse Wong Siu-yin	475	31.5	
ADPL hold		Swing		
HKAS hold		Swing		

Chung Wan By-election, 1986
Party	Candidate	Votes	%	±%
Nonpartisan	Yuen Bun-keung	Unopposed		
Nonpartisan gain from People's Association		Swing		

Central & Western District Board Election, 1985: Chung Wan
Party	Candidate	Votes	%	±%
People's Association	Chow Wai-keung	Unopposed		
HKAS	Gerry Wai Ka-cheung	Unopposed		
People's Association hold		Swing		
HKAS win (new seat)				

Central & Western District Board Election, 1982: Chung Wan
Party	Candidate	Votes	%	±%
Nonpartisan	Chow Wai-keung	1,022	54.3	
Nonpartisan	Chan Kin-hing	499	26.5	
Civic	Chow Bing-wing	355	18.9	
Nonpartisan win (new seat)				
