= Ladder Street =

Street in Hong Kong

Coordinates: 22°17′03″N 114°09′00″E

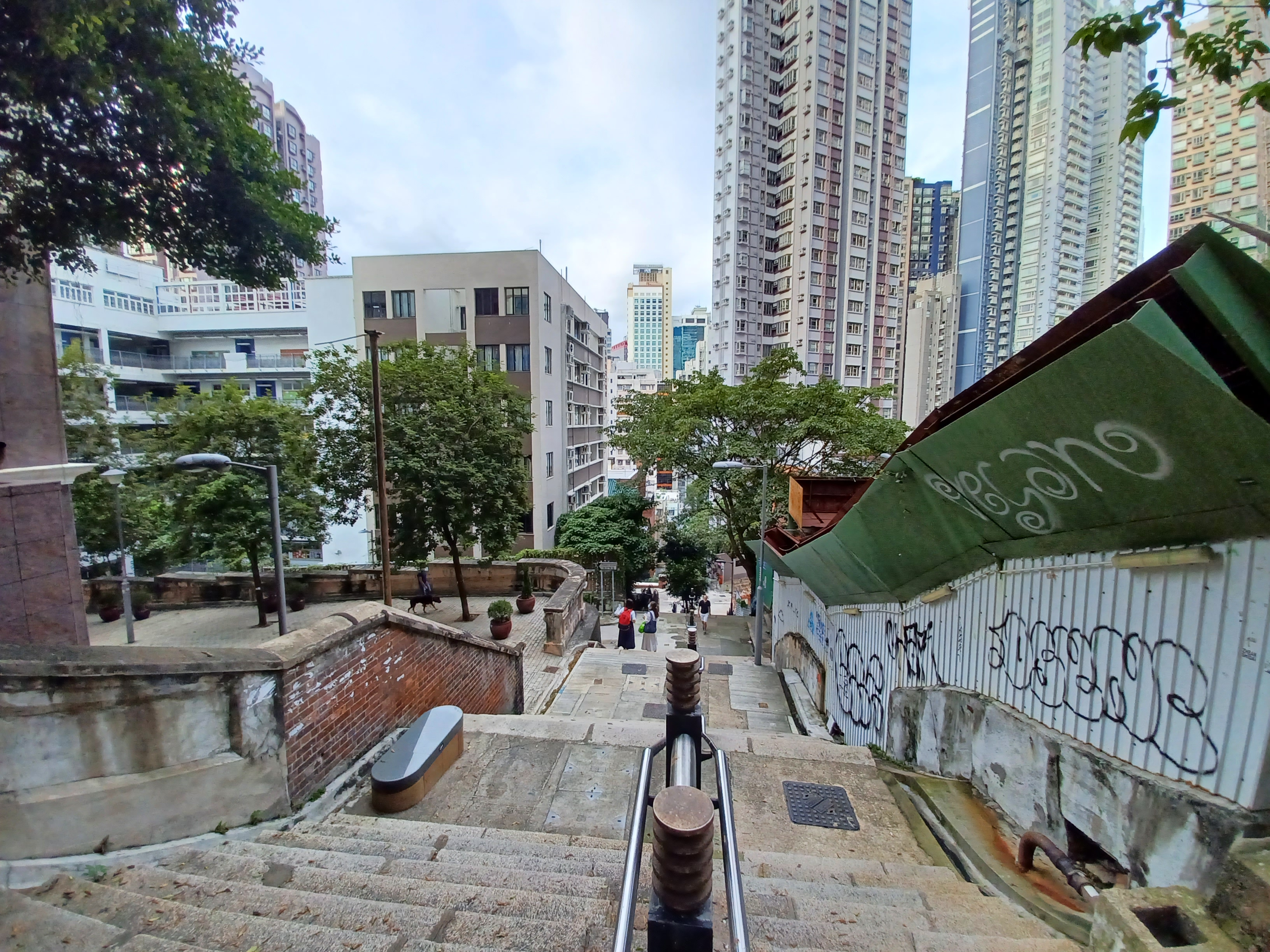
- Ladder Street, looking northeast towards the junction with Rozario Street
- Traditional Chinese: 樓梯街
- Simplified Chinese: 楼梯街
Transcriptions
Standard Mandarin
- Hanyu Pinyin: Lóutī Jiē
Yue: Cantonese
- Yale Romanization: Làuh tāi gāai
- Jyutping: Lau4 tai1 gaai1

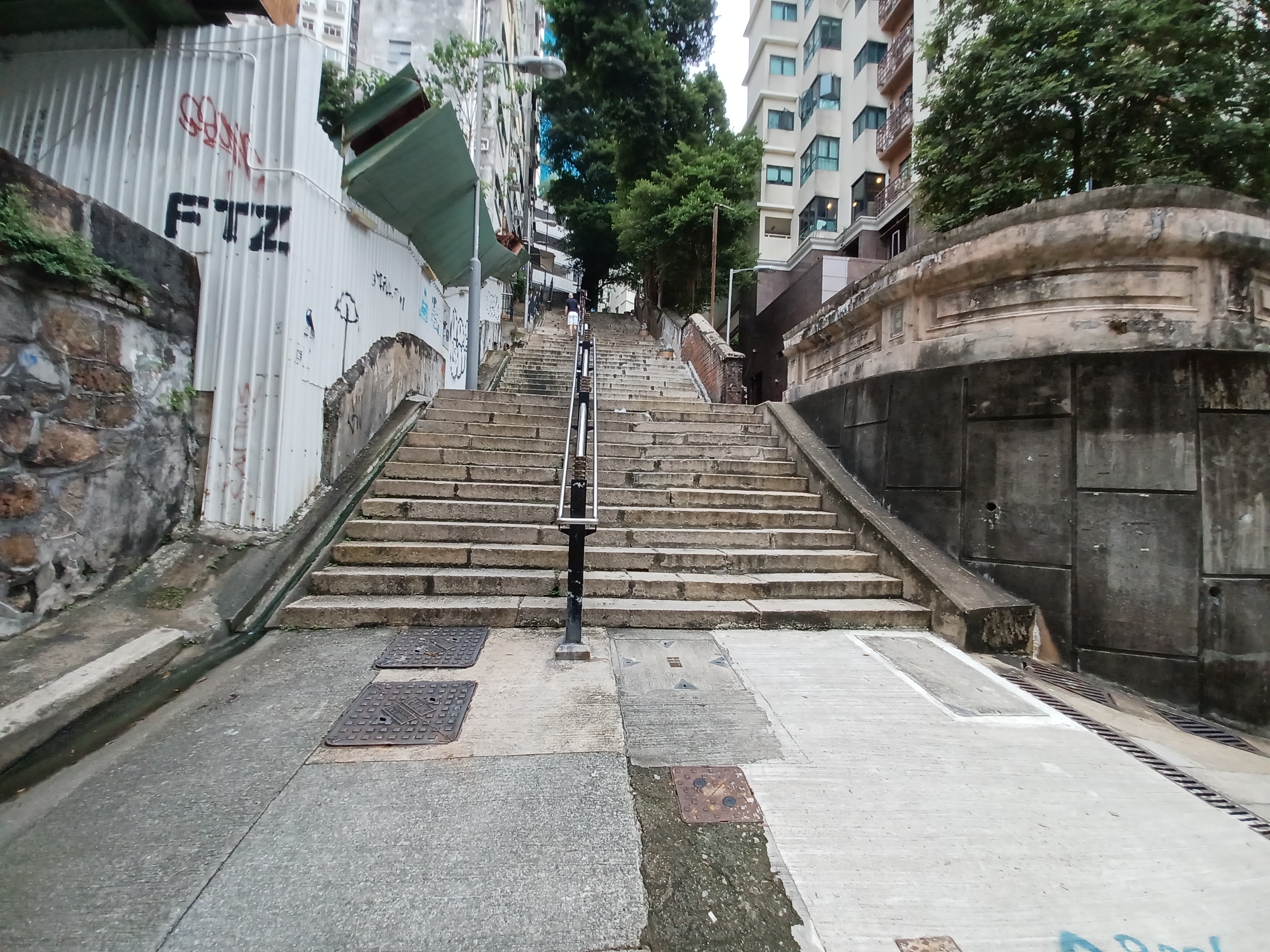
Ladder Street, looking southwest at the junction with Rozario Street.

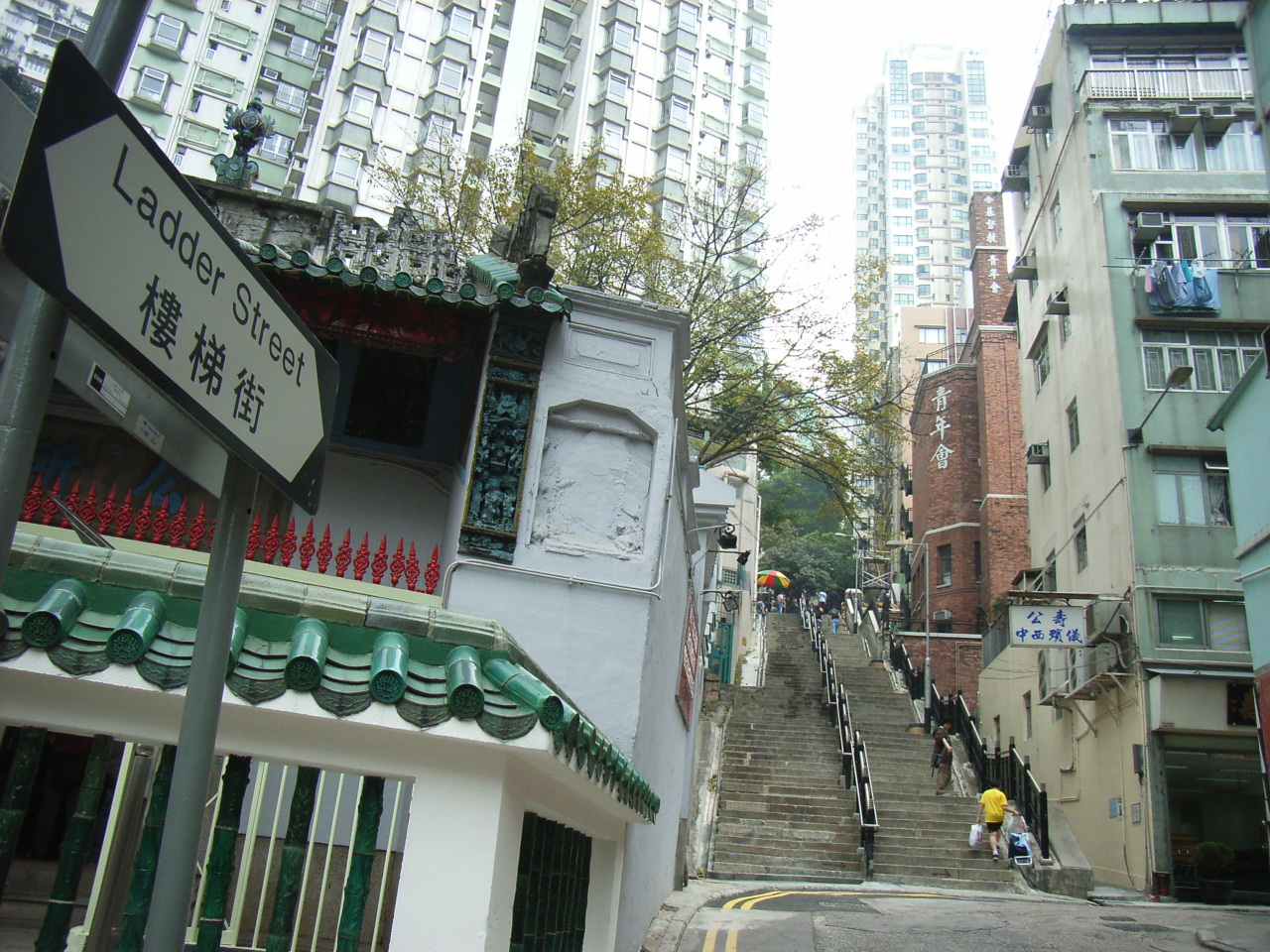
Ladder Street and Man Mo Temple (left) at the junction with Hollywood Road.

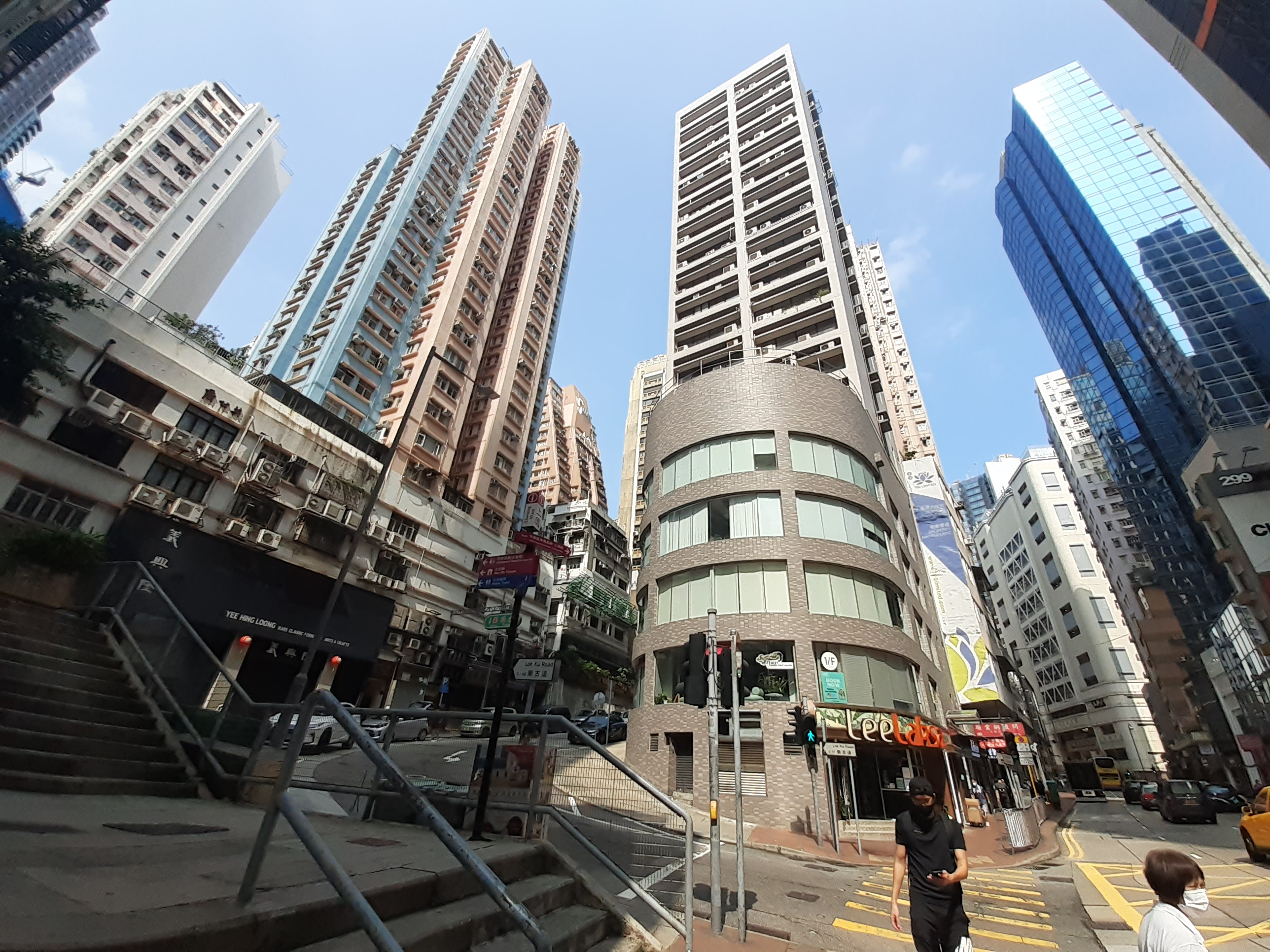
Lower end of Ladder Street, at the junction of Queen's Road Central with Lok Ku Road.

Ladder Street (Chinese: 樓梯街) is a street in the Central and Western District of Hong Kong, consisting entirely of steps and landings formed from a mix of granite slabs and concrete paving. It was so named because it extends up and down in a straight line like a ladder. The street has been listed as a Grade I historic building.

The name has since been applied to describe other streets of this type in Hong Kong.

== History ==
Ladder Street was built between 1841 and 1850. The name 'Ladder Street' first appeared on a plan of Victoria dated 1856.

== Location ==
Ladder Street starts north at the junction of Queen's Road Central with Lok Ku Road (樂古道). It intersects with Hollywood Road and Bridges Street, and has junctions with Upper Lascar Row, Circular Pathway (弓弦巷), Square Street (四方街) and Rozario Street (老沙路街) before reaching its southern terminus at Caine Road.

== Features ==
The Man Mo Temple on Hollywood Road is located on the corner of Ladder Street.

The Chinese YMCA of Hong Kong, Bridges Street Centre, is located on the corner of Bridges Street and Ladder Street.

Metal railings have been installed in the centre of the street, and open drainage channels are located on each side to drain off rainwater. Many old sections of stone retaining walls and boundary walls are present along Ladder Street.

Plans to build escalators on five sections of Ladder Street were considered by the Transport and Housing Bureau, but were abandoned in 2010 due to heritage concerns.

== In popular culture ==
Ladder Street was one of the locations in the 1960 film The World of Suzie Wong.

The street was a main location – and metaphor for the downfall of Hong Kong – in the 2004 Hong Kong independent suspense movie The Cat of Hollywood, directed by Pierre Lam.

== See also ==
- Ladder streets
- Chung Wan (constituency) and Sheung Wan (constituency)
