= Shing Wong Street =

Street in Hong Kong

Coordinates: 22.28410°N 114.15163°E

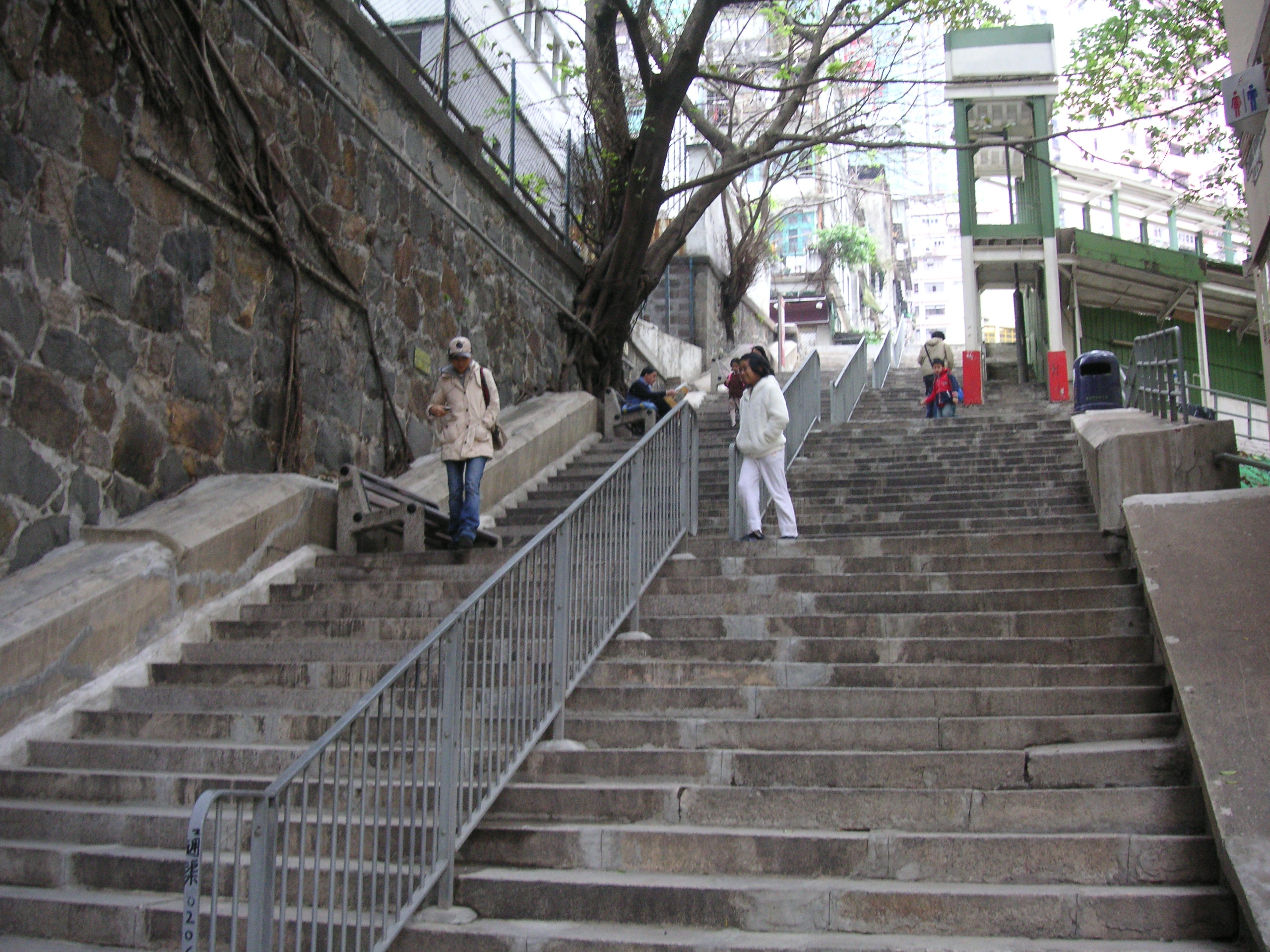
Steps of Shing Wong Street

Shing Wong Street (Chinese: 城皇街) is a street on the hill slope of Sheung Wan and Mid-Levels, Hong Kong. The street extends from Gough Street at its lowest to Caine Road highest. The street is one of ladder streets in Hong Kong, made of stone steps, in the section between Hollywood Road and Caine Road.

Between Hollywood Road and Staunton Street, a large terrace at the street east erects two former staff quarters of Hong Kong Police Force built in 1950s, which have been converted into PMQ. The terrace was constructed for the old campus of Queen's College earlier, the largest building in Hong Kong at the time.

The Staunton Street ends at Shing Wong Street and Bridges Street extends it west. Bridges Street Market is located their junction. Walking upstair are mixture of modern and pre-World War II buildings till the end of the Shing Wong Street at Caine Road.

In 2018, Hong Kong highway officials put anti-skid coating on 100 steps along Shing Wong Street. After public backlash and criticism that the coating would destroy the historic steps, it was removed in early 2019.

== See also ==
- List of streets and roads in Hong Kong
