= Bridges Street =

Street in Hong Kong

Coordinates: 22°17′01″N 114°09′00″E

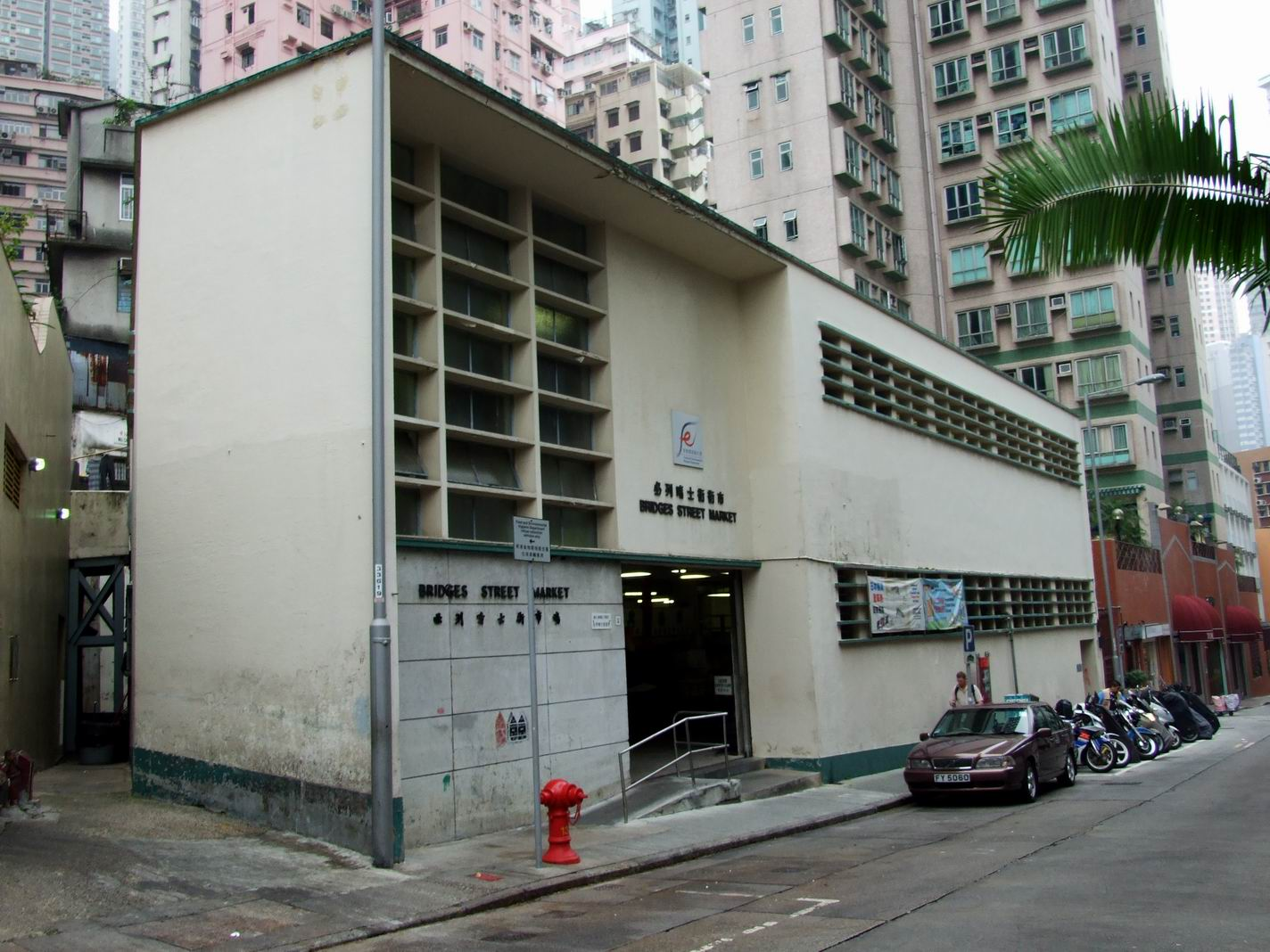
Bridges Street Market in 2008.

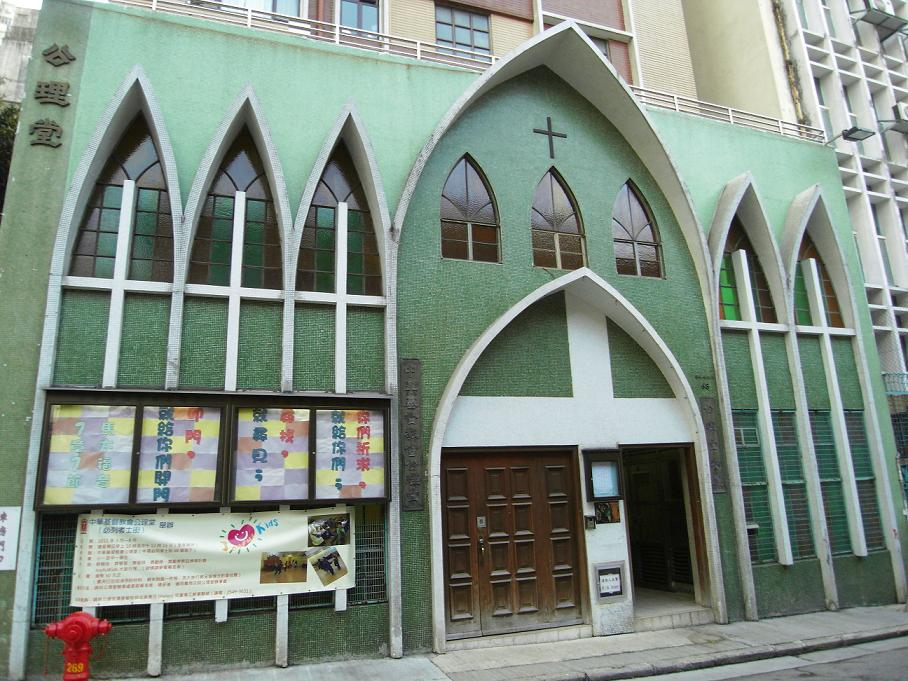
The Church of Christ in China China Congregational Church, Bridges Street in 2011.

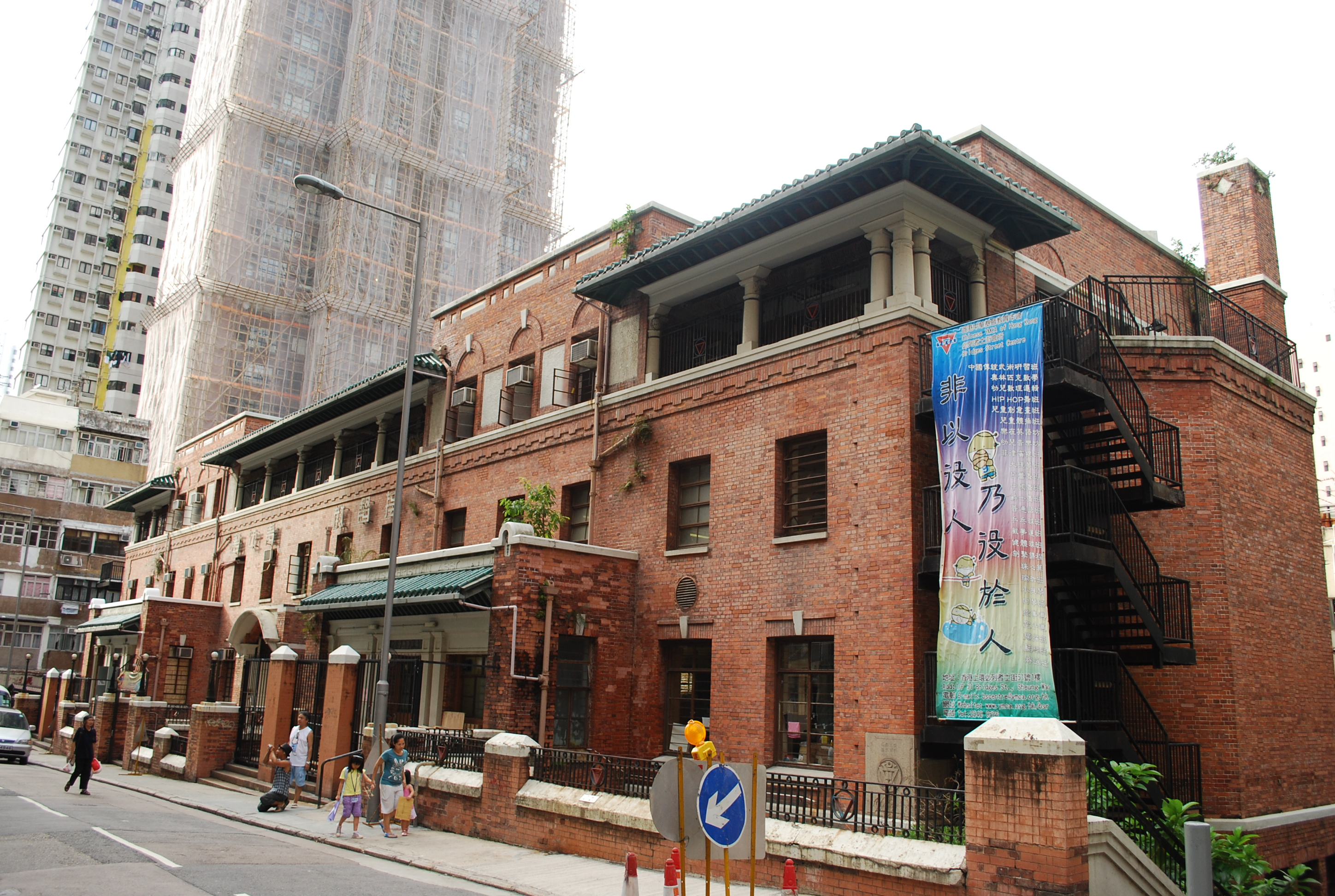
Chinese YMCA of Hong Kong, Bridges Street.

Bridges Street (Chinese: 必列者士街) is a 300-metre two-way street in Sheung Wan, Hong Kong.

== Location ==
At its eastern end, the street intersects Shing Wong Street and Staunton Street. The western end of the street ends with a staircase which intersects with Square Street, Kui In Fong, and Tai Ping Shan Street. The staircase prevents vehicular access to Hollywood Road, and motorists must travel via Aberdeen Street instead.

== Naming ==
The street is named after William Thomas Bridges, a British lawyer, and Acting Attorney General, and Acting Colonial Secretary, who was active in Hong Kong from 1851 to 1861. Bridges was an old friend of Sir John Bowring, the 4th Governor of Hong Kong. The law firm established by Bridges later became known as Deacons.

== Landmarks ==
- Bridges Street Market (No. 2). A Bauhaus-style market, originally opened in 1953, it was renovated and re-opened in 2018 as a news museum. It was partly built on the site of the former American Congregational Mission Preaching House where Dr. Sun Yat-sen was baptised into Christianity in 1883.
- CentreStage, a new luxury landmark apartment near SoHo.
- Ladder Street
- Chinese YMCA of Hong Kong Bridges Street Centre (香港中華基督教青年會必列者士街會所) (No. 51). Built in 1918 in the Eclectic architectural style with Chicago School influence. The architects were Shattuck and Hussey of Chicago, who specialised in designing YMCA buildings. The premises are notable for containing the first indoor swimming pool in Hong Kong, alongside a gymnasium with a mezzanine-level running track. It is part of the Central and Western Heritage Trail. Its central building was formerly a Grade II historic building; its listing was upgraded to Grade I in 2009.
- King's College Old Boys' Association Primary School (英皇書院同學會小學) (No. 58).
- The Church of Christ in China China Congregational Church (中華基督教會公理堂（必列者士街）) (No. 68).
- Island Christian Academy (No. 70)
