= Chan Po-ying =

Hong Kong left-wing activist (born 1956)

- 陳寶瑩
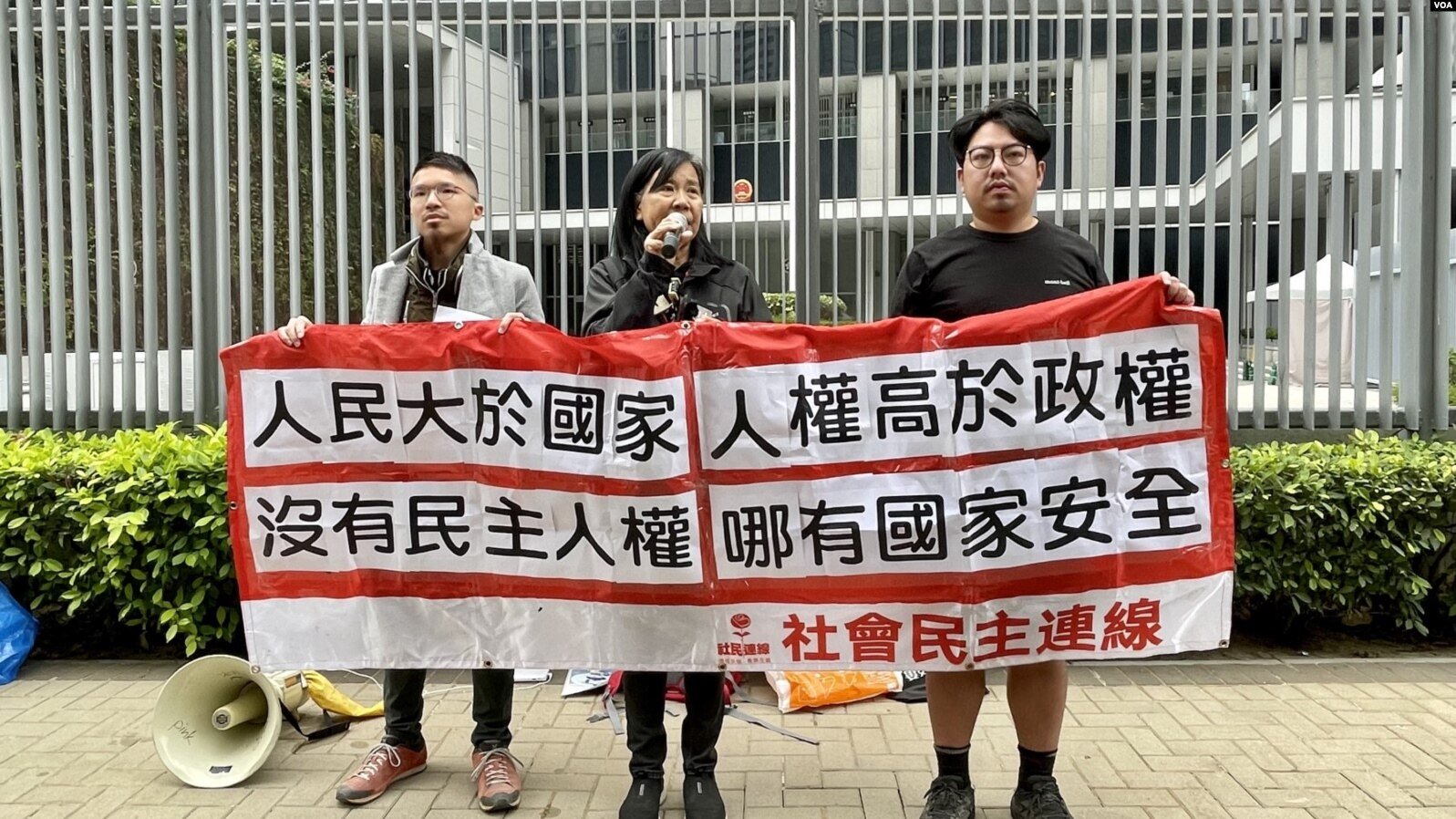
- Chan Po-ying (centre) protesting in 2024

Chairman of League of Social Democrats
- In office 25 July 2021 – 29 June 2025
- Preceded by: Raphael Wong
- Succeeded by: Party disbanded

Personal details
- Born: 2 March 1956 (age 70) Hong Kong
- Party: LSD (until 2025)
- Spouse: Leung Kwok-hung (m. 2021)

Chan Po-ying (Chinese: 陳寶瑩) is a Hong Kong left-wing activist and the final chairperson of League of Social Democrats. She was described as one of the remaining opposition voices in the city following the national security crackdown which forced her to disband the last active pro-democracy party in Hong Kong.

== Early activism ==
Born in British Hong Kong to a family migrated from China, Chan Po-ying came of age during the emerging social movements, such as Vietnam War protests, civil rights movement, and women's suffrage movement, and heavily influenced her views. Chan joined the Trotskyist party Revolutionary Marxist League in around 1975 and met Leung Kwok-hung, then a member. Her father disowned her for participating in politics, forcing Chan to work in garment factory for four years in her 20s. In the early 1980s, she attempted to form a union of garment workers but failed. In 1984 she helped forming the Association for the Advancement of Feminism, before studying social work in university at 30. Chan is also dedicated to advocate labour rights and rights of women and poor, and supported the victims of domestic violence or sexual assault. She became a well-known figure in protests that support left-wing and grassroots groups.

== League of Social Democrats ==
League of Social Democrats (LSD) was formed in 2006, positioning itself at the radical left-wing of the pan-democracy camp striving for better livelihood of the grassroots. Chan was one of the founding members, joining Leung Kwok-hung, Wong Yuk-man, Andrew To, and others. While not a formal grandee of the party, she was one of the key coordinators of street activism, such as protesting against constitutional reform in 2007, the Express Rail Link in 2008, and in 2010 supporting the self-branded "referendum" by-election.

She first ran for election in 2007 local elections representing LSD, but was defeated in Tsui Ping South constituency. After Leung Kwok-hung was re-elected in 2008 to the Legislative Council, Chan became the assistant of Leung, serving the role until Leung was disqualified as MP in 2017. She was also the secretary-general of LSD from 2016 to 2020, before she stood back as vice until 2021.

== Final pro-democracy leader ==
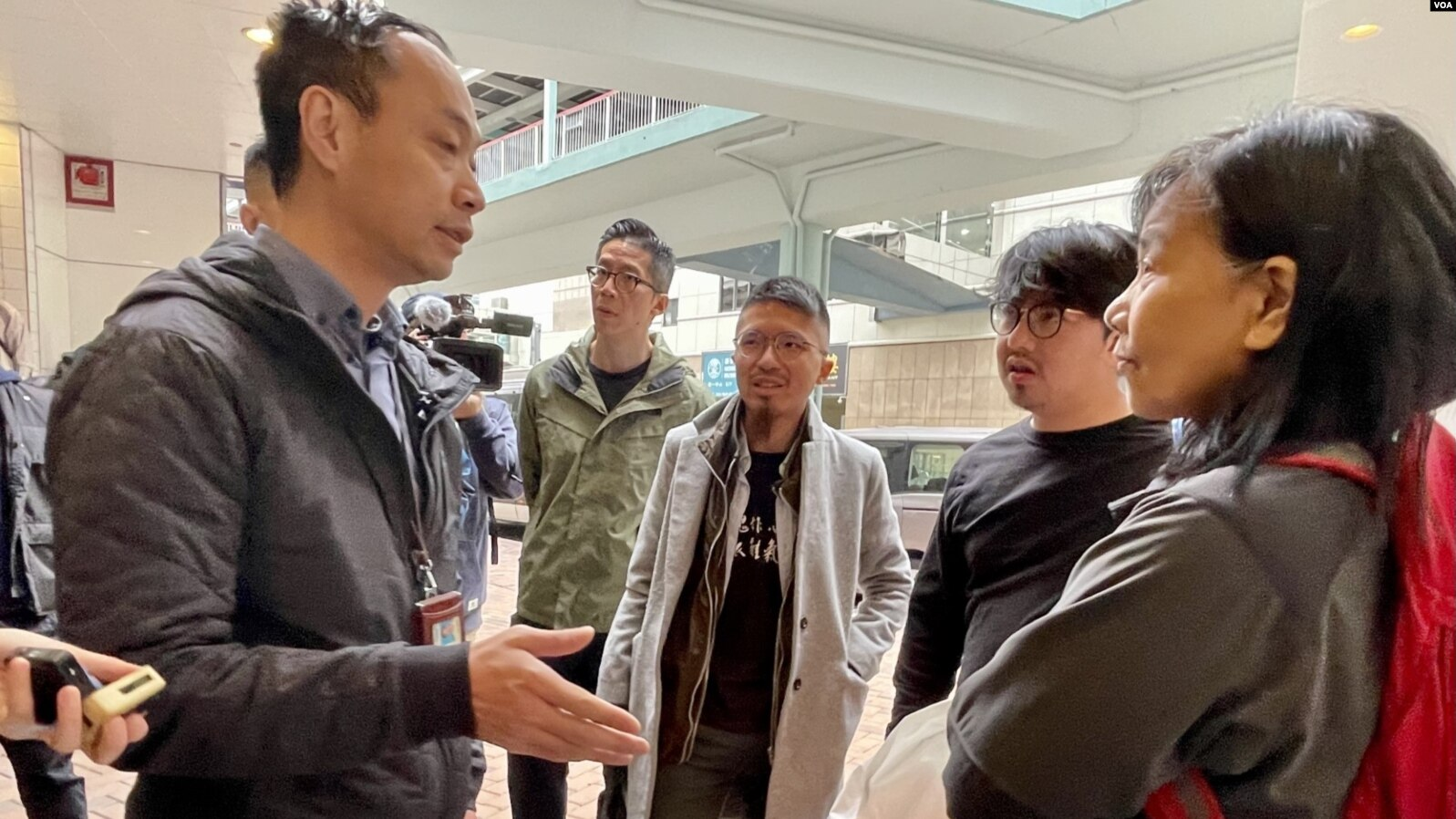
Chan and other LSD members surrounded by plain-clothes police when they tried to petition against the government in February 2024

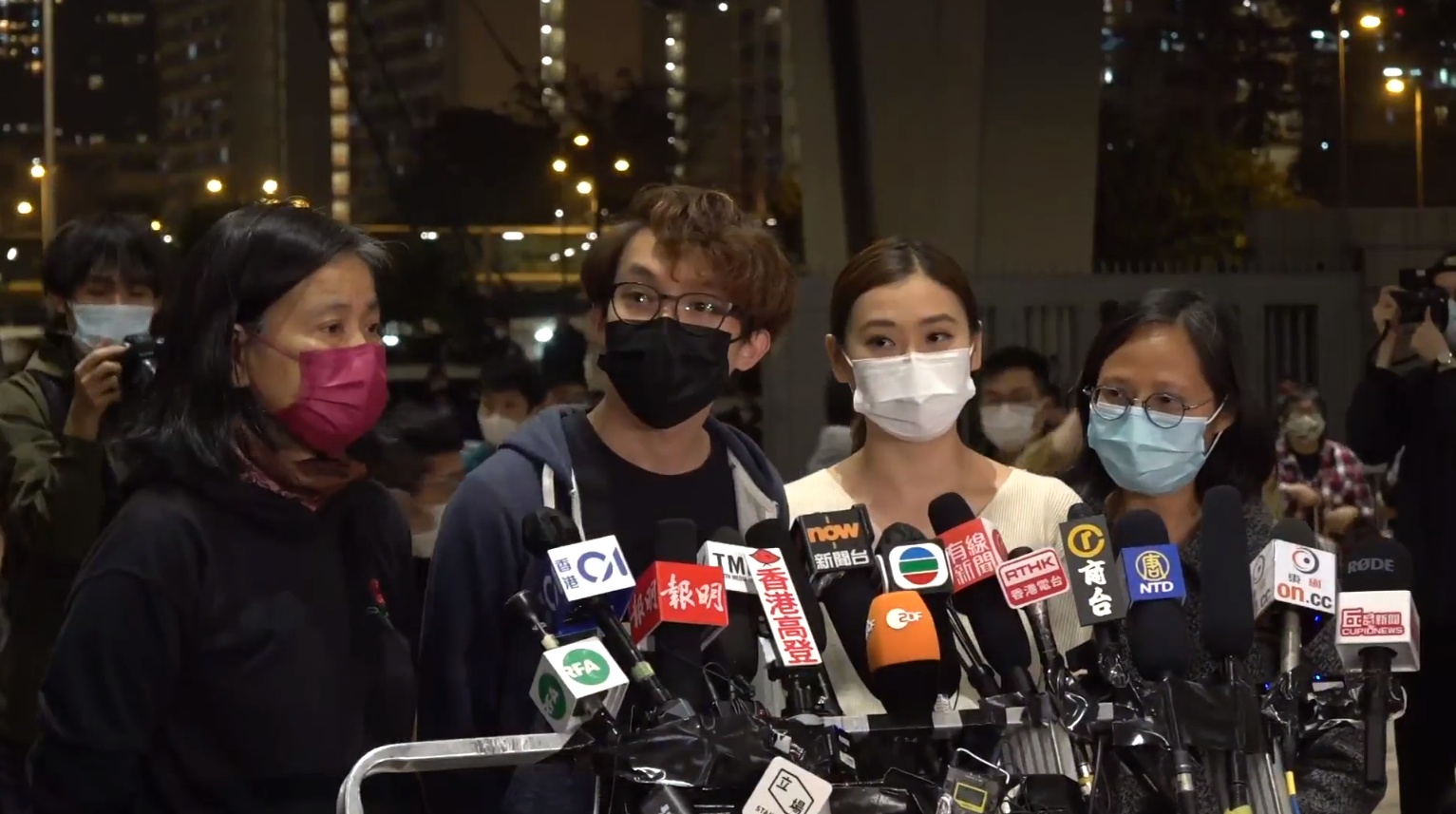
Chan (leftmost) met the press after Leung was remanded by court for subversion

The national security law imposed by the Chinese government to Hong Kong was seen as a blow to the city's democracy movement, and even non-political organisations were forced to disband. On 28 February 2021 amidst a crackdown on the Hong Kong 47, Leung, a candidate in the legislative primaries, was charged and remanded for subversion. Raphael Wong, chairman of the LSD, was later jailed for unauthorised assemblies during 2019 protests, and Chan Po-ying was elected party chair on 25 July 2021 at a special general meeting.

Despite the continued suppression of pro-democracy camp, Chan remained committed to activism at street booths, rallying against several government's policies and budget or raising concerns on housing and elderly issues. As a result, she and other party activists were charged with illegal fundraising or posters, which they described as an oppression against freedom of speech. The bank accounts of the LSD and several party members, including Chan, were terminated in 2023. Chan accused the banks were politically motivated to make the decision. They were also found guilty of the charges and fined afterwards.

After taking the realm of the protest group, Chan was under increasing police surveillance. On one occasion she and other members were briefly detained by the police when went hiking, and on another surrounded by dozens of police at rallies. The party was also contacted by the authorities "suggesting" they do not petition to the government on politically sensitive dates.

On 29 June 2025, Chan hosted a press conference announcing the closure of the League of Social Democrats, saying she was "left with no choice" and had considered the safety of colleagues. The disbandment of the last standing pro-democracy party marks the end of opposition bloc in Hong Kong.

== Personal life ==
Chan was divorced before she married her long-time partner Leung Kwok-hung in January 2021, after Leung was arrested by the national security police as part of the Hong Kong 47. During an interview Chan described Leung as a "troublesome guy" when they first met in the 1970s, and the 2005 anti-WTO riot solidified their bond.
