= Shatin Pui Ying College =

Christian school in Hong Kong

Coordinates: 22°23′21.4″N 114°11′40.1″E

- 沙田培英中學
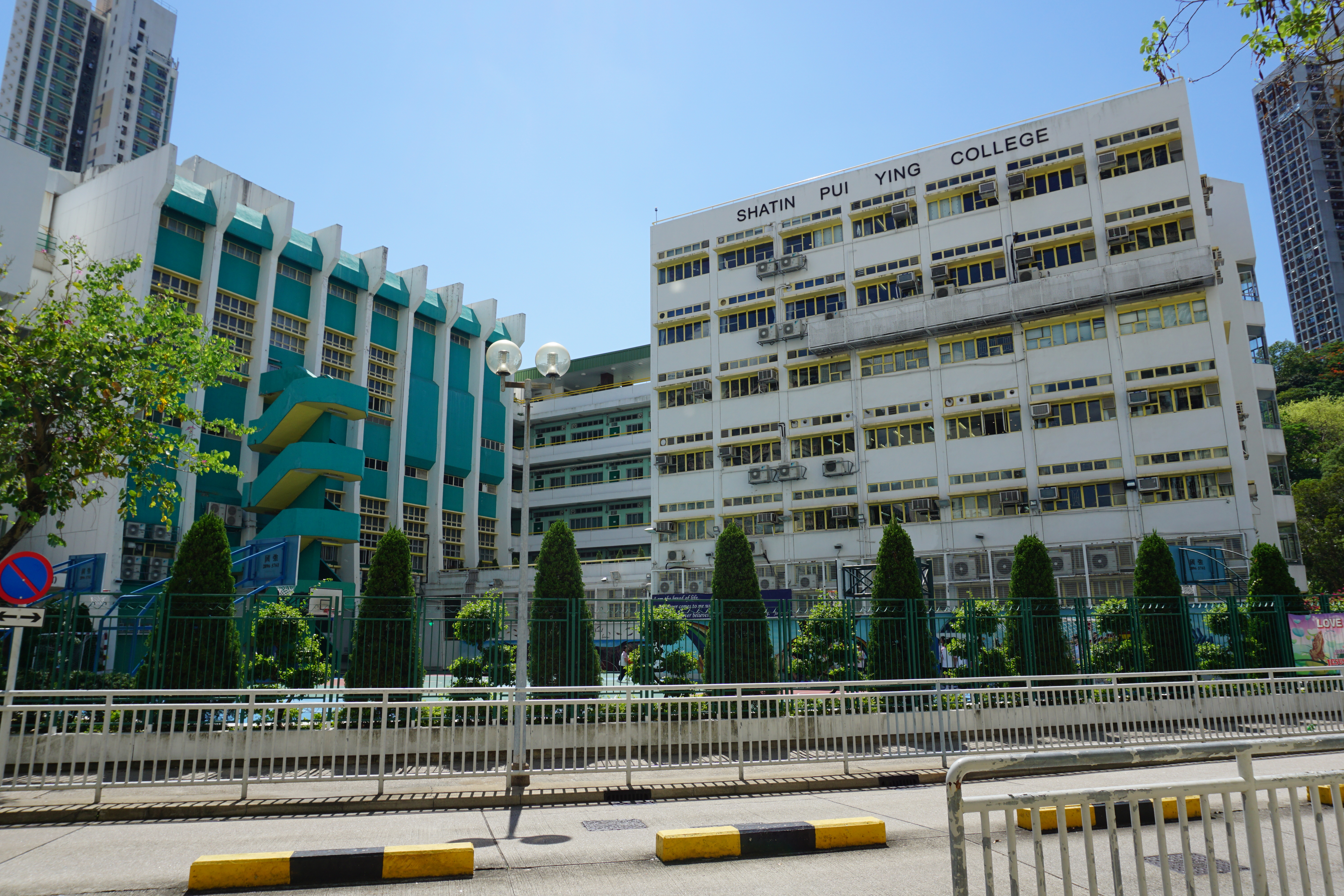
- View of the school

Location
- 9 Fung Shun Street, Wo Che Estate, Sha Tin, NT, Hong Kong

Information
- Type: Grammar, Secondary
- Motto: Faith, Hope, Love
- Established: 1978
- School district: Sha Tin
- Principal: Mr Chu Ka Tim
- Faculty: around 70
- Grades: F1 to F6
- Gender: Co-educational
- Enrollment: around 1200
- Colours: White and green
- Mascot: Eagle
- Affiliation: Christian
- Phone: (852) 2691 7217
- Website: http://www.pyc.edu.hk/

Shatin Pui Ying College
- Traditional Chinese: 沙田培英中學
- Simplified Chinese: 沙田培英中学
Transcriptions
Standard Mandarin
- Hanyu Pinyin: Shātián Péi Yīng zhōngxué
Yue: Cantonese
- Jyutping: saa1 tin4 pui4 jing1 zung1 hok6

Shatin Pui Ying College (Chinese: 沙田培英中學), abbreviated as SPYC or PYC, is a Christian school that was established in 1978. Located in Hong Kong, SPYC is an English medium of instruction (EMI) secondary school fully subsidised by the government with 4 classes each for Forms 1 to 5 and 5 classes for Form 6 (in the 2018/19 academic year). The school icon is an eagle symbolising courage and determination.

== School history ==
Rev Henry Noyes, the school founder, was a minister of the U.S. Presbyterian Church. In 1879 he founded a beginners' school called An Hwoh School in Saki, Guangzhou, offering Mathematics and Science. With a lot of hard work, Pui Ying emerged and bloomed. A chain of schools was established in Guangzhou, Taishan, Jiangmen and Hong Kong.

In 1978, to celebrate the centennial, the Board of Directors established the 5th school; an Anglo-Chinese School named Shatin Pui Ying College, with Wong Wai Wah as the Principal. In the first year, the school operated on the campus of Baptist Lui Ming Choi Secondary School at Lek Yuen Estate. In September 1979, the school could at last move into the 10-classroom premises in Wo Che Estate. The school library was opened in September 1982.

In order to enable the promotion of all Form 3 students to Form 4 in the school, the school altered the class structure to a symmetrical one. The Student Union was set up in September 1995 and Parent-Teacher Association in 1996.

The new wing building of the school has been in use since July 2005. In the new wing, there are classrooms for higher form classes, a new library, and some special rooms.

On 9 September 2019, the human chain activity in the 2019–20 Hong Kong protests was launched. Students and alumni of various secondary schools in Hong Kong initiated the chain action to express their determination to fight for the five demands. The students of this school participated. The activity starts at about 7 o'clock in the morning and ends at about 8 o'clock. Among the 18 districts in Hong Kong, apart from the island district, the remaining 17 districts have middle school students and alumni involved in this operation.

Exchange students from Italy, Brazil, and Germany help to enhance students' English ability. To enhance students’ interest and ability in English, the school offers Script-writing Course, English Tutorial Class, English Drama Competition, Form 1 Bridging Programme, Lyrics-writing Course, English Immersion Speech Competition, Tourist Interview, English Phonetics Class, English Enhancement Course, Summer English Class, Overseas Immersion Course, Summer English Camp for senior form students, Summer English Day Camp for junior form students, and English Musicals.

English musicals:

- 1999–2001 The Comeback Kid
- 2001–2003 Soul for Sale
- 2003–2005 The Last Move
- 2005–2007 The Lost Face
- 2007–2009 Heart in Arms
- 2009–2011 Project Messiah
- 2011–2013 The Twelfth Night
- 2013–2015 The Merchant of Venice
- 2015–2017 Flowers for Algernon
- 2017–2019 Twinkle of the Aye
- 2019–2022 Cyrano de Bergerac
- 2022—2024 Attune
- 2024—2026 Conviction

== School life ==
=== School songs ===
There is a school song with Chinese lyrics. Its melody is the same as the song O Christmas Tree and there are three paragraphs. There is also a school hymn with English lyrics. There are three paragraphs in this school hymn.

=== Sports Days and Swimming Gala ===
There is a Sports Day every year. The Sports Days usually take places at the Yuen Wo Road Sports Ground, but occasionally at the Ma On Shan Sports Ground. Besides the various types of sports competitions, there are competitions among the cheering teams. The Swimming Gala is held every year. It takes place at the Ma On Shan (town) swimming pool.

=== External competitions ===
Students in the school take part in many external competitions in many fields such as music, sports, debates, writings, mathematics, and other academic competitions. One of the most notable competitions is the Hang Lung Mathematics Award. The school’s HLMA team got an Honourable Mention in 2004 and a Special Commendation in 2006. The school also participated in the global 'F1 in Schools' competition in 2024 in which the students represented Hong Kong in the finals.

== School organisations ==
=== Student Union ===
The Student Union was established in November 1994. Its election activity is held in November every year. It helps the school in setting new school rules and improving students’ school lives. It organises activities such as blood donation days and ball game competitions.

=== School library ===
As of the beginning of 2017, the school library has over 32000 items available, including books, multimedia items and 50 kinds of newspapers and magazines. Every year there are about 100 student librarians. An integrated library system was installed in the library September 2001. The library currently uses the SLS Software as its digital solution. The library was relocated to the new wing of the school in 2005, allowing a physical expansion.

== Notable alumni ==
- Joey Yung (容祖兒): A very popular female Canto pop singer and actress.
- Louise Ho (何璐怡): A female dubbing actress in TVB.
- Tsoi Chi Fu (蔡智夫): A writer of a computer reference book.
- Raphel Wong (黃浩銘): Vice Chairman for League of Social Democrats

== See also ==
- Education in Hong Kong
