= Social Democratic Forum =

Social Democratic Forum 社會民主論壇
- Convenor: Fung Chi-wood
- Founded: 2000
- Dissolved: 17 April 2002
- Split from: Democratic Party
- Merged into: The Frontier
- Ideology: Direct democracy Radical democracy Social democracy
- Political position: Centre-left to left-wing
- Regional affiliation: Pro-democracy camp
- Colours: Blue, red

Social Democratic Forum
- Traditional Chinese: 社會民主論壇
Transcriptions
Yue: Cantonese
- Yale Romanization: Séh wuih màhn jyú leuhn tàahn
- Jyutping: Se^{5} wui^{6*2} man^{4} zyu^{2} leon^{6} taan^{4}

The Social Democratic Forum (Chinese: 社會民主論壇, SDF) was a short-lived political group in Hong Kong formed by the radical faction of the Democratic Party. It consisted mostly the "Young Turks" faction of the Democratic Party which took a more pro-grassroots and street action approaches. It ceased to exist in April 2002 when most members joined The Frontier.

== History ==
It was formed in the background of the intra-party struggles in the Democratic Party in 2000. The factional struggle began in the 1998 Democratic Party leadership election where the Young Turks who believed in more pro-grassroots and radical approaches launched a "coup d'etat", supporting trade unionist Lau Chin-shek to run against incumbent Vice-Chairman Anthony Cheung who was leader of the Meeting Point faction who believed in pro-middle class and moderate methods. The intra-party struggle intensified when Andrew To proposed to put the minimum wage legislation on the 2000 Legislative Council election platform but was defeated by the Mainstreamers faction. The Young Turks faction were discontent with the monopoly of the Central Committee by the party leaders and the party's position on grassroots issues, as well as lack of financial support from the party.

Led by Convenor Fung Chi-wood, SDF core members included Andrew To and Lau San-ching. The SDF took an active role in the campaign against Chief Executive Tung Chee-hwa seeking for second term, co-founding the Hong Kong Democratic Development Network and Coalition Against Secord Term which opposed the unfair Chief Executive election. It protested the "small-circle" Election Committee subsector by-elections and protested against the uncontested election which saw Tung Chee-hwa re-elected for the second term.

In February 2002, the SDF and The Frontier issued a joint platform, demanding amendment of the Basic Law and introducing referendum, protecting judicial independence, introducing competition law, collective bargaining and laws protecting the poor and women. On 17 April 2002, the SDF general meeting announced dissolution of the SDF, in which 25 members including convenor Fung Chi-wood, deputy Steve Chan Kwok-leung, Andrew To, Leung Wing-kuen, Tsui Pak-tai and Lam Sam-shing who had already joined the Frontier, with about 25 other associates, in total of 50 members would join The Frontier, in which 42 would become the party members.

== Notable members ==
- Steve Chan Kwok-leung
- Chui Pak-tai
- Gary Fan
- Fung Chi-wood
- Comas Kwong Kwok-chuen
- Lam Sum-shing
- Lau San-ching
- Leung Wing-kuen
- Andrew To
- Tsang Kin-shing
- Eric Wong Chung-ki
