= Chuk Yuen North (constituency) =

Electoral constituency in Hong Kong

- Elected constituency for the Wong Tai Sin District Council
- Boundary of Chuk Yuen North in Wong Tai Sin District
- District: Wong Tai Sin
- Legislative Council constituency: Kowloon Central
- Population: 15,131 (2019)
- Electorate: 11,322 (2019)

Current constituency
- Created: 1991
- Number of members: One
- Member: (Vacant)

Chuk Yuen North
- Traditional Chinese: 竹園北
Transcriptions
Yue: Cantonese
- Yale Romanization: Jūk yùhn bāk
- Jyutping: Zuk1 jyun4 bak1

Chuk Yuen North is one of the 25 constituencies of the Wong Tai Sin District Council. The seat elects one member of the council every four years. The boundary is loosely based on upon the area of Chuk Yuen North Estate.

== Councillors represented ==
Election	Member	Party
1991	Andrew To Kwan-hang	United Democrats→Democratic
1994	Fung Leung Kwai-ping	DAB
1999	Ho Hon-man	Nonpartisan
2003	Andrew To Kwan-hang	Frontier
2007	Andrew To Kwan-hang	LSD
2011	Roy Tin Chi-wai	Independent
2015	Roy Tin Chi-wai	Independent
2019	Cheng Tsz-kin→Vacant (Note: Resigned on 31 May 2021 over new oath-taking laws.)	Independent

== Election results ==
=== 2010s ===
Wong Tai Sin District Council Election, 2019: Chuk Yuen North
Party	Candidate	Votes	%	±%
Independent	Cheng Tsz-kin	4,221	55.50	
Independent	Roy Tin Chi-wai	3,384	44.50	−25.40
Majority		837	11.00	
Turnout		7,636	67.47	
Independent gain from Independent		Swing		

Wong Tai Sin District Council Election, 2015: Chuk Yuen North
Party	Candidate	Votes	%	±%
Independent	Roy Tin Chi-wai	2,799	69.9	+13.9
People Power	Chan Kit-bing	1,206	30.1	
Majority		1,593	39.8	–28.9
Turnout		4,104	36.8	
Independent hold		Swing		

Wong Tai Sin District Council Election, 2011: Chuk Yuen North
Party	Candidate	Votes	%	±%
Independent	Tin Chi-wai	2,754	55.96	N/A
LSD	Andrew To Kwan-hang	1,660	33.73	−26.68
Nonpartisan	Chan Ka-wai	507	10.30	N/A
Majority		1,094	10.94	−9.88
Independent gain from LSD		Swing		

=== 2000s ===
Wong Tai Sin District Council Election, 2007: Chuk Yuen North
Party	Candidate	Votes	%	±%
LSD	Andrew To Kwan-hang	2,825	60.41	+8.66
Nonpartisan	Angel Leung	1,851	39.59	N/A
Majority		974	20.82	+8.54
LSD hold		Swing		

Wong Tai Sin District Council Election, 2003: Chuk Yuen North
Party	Candidate	Votes	%	±%
Frontier	Andrew To Kwan-hang	2,941	51.75	N/A
DAB	Ho Hon-man	2,243	39.47	+0.53
Nonpartisan	Fung Leung Kwai-ping	499	8.78	−23.94
Majority		698	12.28	+6.06
Frontier gain from DAB		Swing		

=== 1990s ===
Wong Tai Sin District Council Election, 1999: Chuk Yuen North
Party	Candidate	Votes	%	±%
Nonpartisan	Ho Hon-man	1,340	38.94	N/A
DAB	Fung Leung Kwai-ping	1,126	32.72	−27.39
ADPL	Pong Ka-man	975	28.33	N/A
Majority		214	6.22	−24.18
Nonpartisan gain from DAB		Swing		

Wong Tai Sin District Board Election, 1994: Chuk Yuen North
Party	Candidate	Votes	%	±%
DAB	Fung Leung Kwai-ping	2,173	60.11	+30.02
Democratic	Lam Yiu-keung	1,074	29.71	N/A
Nonpartisan	Hui Ching-hon	368	10.18	−11.04
Majority		1,099	30.40	
DAB gain from Democratic		Swing	+11.80	

Wong Tai Sin District Board Election, 1991: Chuk Yuen North
Party	Candidate	Votes	%	±%
United Democrats	Andrew To Kwan-hang	2,044	48.69	
LDF	Fung Leung Kwai-ping	1,263	30.09	
Nonpartisan	Hui Ching-hon	891	21.22	
Majority		781	18.60	(new)
United Democrats win (new seat)				
