= Yan Sun-kong =

Hong Kong politician and journalist

- 甄燊港
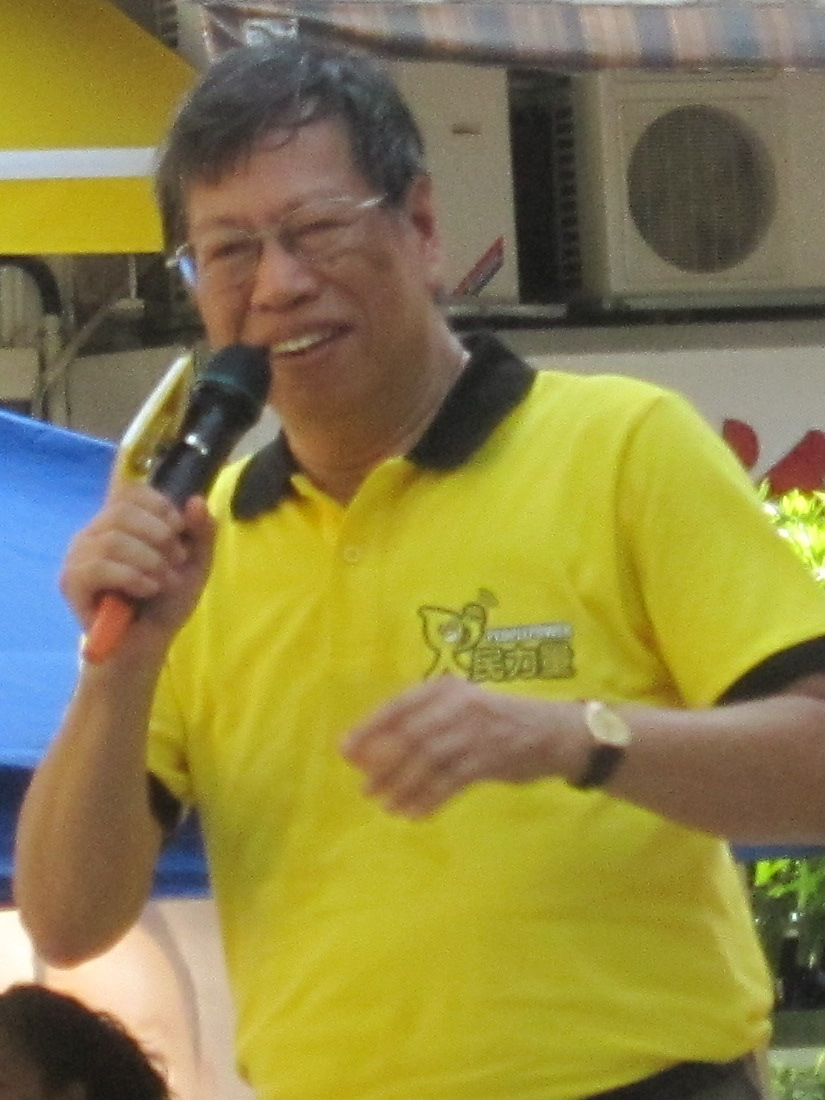

Convenor of The Frontier
- Incumbent
- Assumed office 9 September 2010

Personal details
- Born: Hong Kong
- Party: The Frontier (1996–2008); The Frontier (2010–present)
- Education: National Taiwan University (BA)

Thomas Yan Sun-kong (Chinese: 甄燊港) is a Hong Kong politician and former journalist. He is the current convenor of The Frontier and the former vice-chairman of People Power.

== Biography ==
Yan was born in Hong Kong and was sent abroad and graduated from the National Taiwan University before he returned to Hong Kong and joined the Commercial Radio Hong Kong as a reporter. From 1977 to 1978, he was the president of the Hong Kong Journalists Association after David Leith resigned in mid-term.

He was a core member of The Frontier formed in 1996 by Legislative Councillor Emily Lau. With Lau, he joined the organisation of the Anti-Tung Solidarity against the unpopular Chief Executive Tung Chee-hwa formed by Stephen Shiu.

In 2008 when Emily Lau and other Frontier members decided to merge into the Democratic Party, Yan opposed the decision and set up a new group with the same name in 2010, where he has become the convenor since. The Frontier became one of the constituent groups of the People Power led by Wong Yuk-man and funded by Stephen Shiu in 2011. He became one of the two vice-chairmen, until the Frontier left the People Power in April 2016.

The Frontier filled in joint candidates with the People Power in the constituencies against the Democratic Party which aimed to "punish" the Democrats for its compromise with the Beijing authorities over the constitutional reform proposal in 2010. One of the notable candidates was Raymond Chan who ran against former Democratic Party chairman Lee Wing-tat in Lai Wah. Raymond Chan would later be elected to the Legislative Council in the 2012 election.

Party political offices
Preceded by Andrew To	Secretary-General of The Frontier; 2006–2008	Merged into Democratic Party
New title	Convenor of The Frontier; 2010–present	Incumbent
New title	Vice-Chairman of People Power; 2011–2016	Succeeded by Tam Tak-chi
