= Avery Ng =

Hong Kong politician and social activist

- 吳文遠
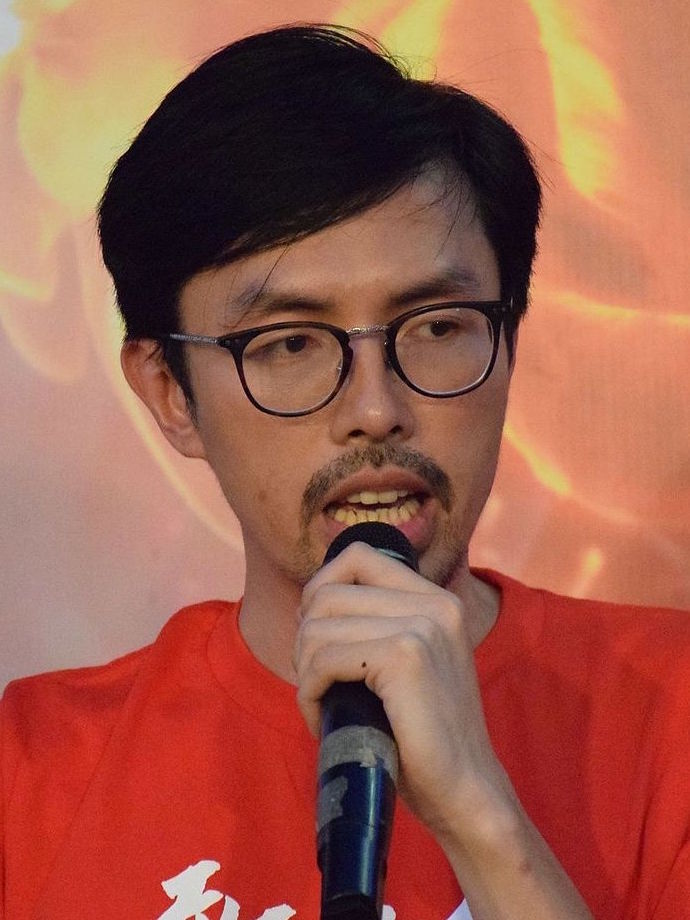

Chairman of the League of Social Democrats
- In office 21 February 2016 – 2 March 2020
- Preceded by: Leung Kwok-hung
- Succeeded by: Raphael Wong

Personal details
- Born: 27 December 1976 (age 49) Hong Kong
- Party: League of Social Democrats
- Education: University of Melbourne

Avery Ng Man-yuen (Chinese: 吳文遠; born 27 December 1976) is a Hong Kong politician and social activist. He is the chairman of the League of Social Democrats (LSD), a pro-democracy radical social democratic party in Hong Kong.

== Early life and education ==
Ng was born in Hong Kong on 27 December 1976 and raised in Sham Shui Po, a poor neighbourhood in Hong Kong. His father, who once was a sailor, made his fortune by starting his own business. He migrated to New Zealand with his family when he was 13, studying at the Auckland Grammar School and the University of Melbourne in Australia with double degrees of Mechanical Engineering and Actuarial Studies. He also studied for a Master of Business Administration at the London Business School in 2003, but returned to Australia as a strategy consultant before he finished the degree.

== Return to Hong Kong ==
Ng returned to Hong Kong in 2008 during the 2008 Legislative Council election. Angered by the pro-Beijing dominance, Ng joined the pro-democracy radical social democratic party, the League of Social Democrats (LSD) in 2009. He has been active in social activism and protests since then and has been arrested and charged. In the 2012 Legislative Council election, he surrendered his Australian and New Zealand citizenships in order to run in the Hong Kong Island constituency. He received 3,169 votes, about one percent of the popular votes and was not elected.

He had been vice-chairman of the LSD since 2010. In February 2016, he was elected the chairman of the LSD, succeeding legislator "Longhair" Leung Kwok-hung.

== Legal cases ==
=== 2018 ICAC disclosure case ===
In April 2016, Ng had disclosed to broadcaster RTHK during a media interview that the Independent Commission Against Corruption (ICAC) was investigating Betty Fung Ching Suk-yee, then Permanent Secretary of the Home Affairs Bureau, for alleged corruption involving a luxury flat purchased. In April 2017, Ng was arrested and charged for disclosing the identity of a person under investigation by ICAC.

In May 2018, Magistrate Cheng Lim-chi convicted Ng on three counts under section 30(1)(b) of the Prevention of Bribery Ordinance for disclosing the identity of a person under investigation. He was sentenced to four months’ imprisonment, despite most people convicted in similar cases dodging prison in recent decades.

Ng defended the disclosure was in the public interest and his actions as an exercise of civic transparency, stating that his intention was to inform the public about potential misconduct involving senior government officials.

In February 2020, the Court of Appeal of the High Court dismissed his appeal. As a result of the custodial sentence, Ng was automatically disqualified from running for public office for the next five years under Hong Kong’s electoral law.

=== Other legal cases ===
On 18 April 2020, Ng was one of the 15 high-profile Hong Kong democracy figures arrested that day. According to the police statement, his arrest was based on suspicion of organizing, publicizing or taking part in several unauthorized assemblies between August and October 2019 during the anti-extradition bill protests.

On 18 May 2021, Ng was remanded in custody by District Judge Amanda Woodcock, over his participation in an unauthorised assembly in 2019. Ng accused the judicial system of persecution and argued that the justice in Hong Kong had been "weaponized" to target pro-democracy figures. About the future of his League of Social Democrats party, he said that they have inside cautious optimism but pointed out an "uncertain" future under the national security law and with its two vice chairmen (Leung Kwok-hung and Jimmy Sham) awaiting trial for subversion.

On 28 May 2021, Ng was sentenced to 14 months' imprisonment over the unauthorised assembly, remanding him in custody, after a suspended 2019 sentence was automatically activated.

Party political offices
| Preceded by Leung Kwok-hung | Chairman of League of Social Democrats; 2016–2020 | Succeeded by Raphael Wong |
