= Guangdong Scheme =

Welfare benefit scheme in Hong Kong

Guangdong Scheme (Chinese: 廣東計劃) was launched on 1 October 2013. The purpose of the Scheme is to provide the Old Age Allowance (Fruit Money), on a monthly basis, for eligible Hong Kong people aged 65 or above who choose to reside in Guangdong. The recipients can get a monthly cash allowance of $1,135 if they satisfy the minimum residence period of 60 days in Guangdong in a payment year, along with the other requirements.

The Social Welfare Department has received over 18.7 thousand applications until September 2014 and over 16 thousand Hong Kong elderly who lived in Guangdong province have received 1,180 Hong Kong dollars bonus per month since the scheme was launched. While going to Guangdong for retirement becomes a more and more popular phenomenon, the public holds different attitudes.

== Background ==
=== Hong Kong's aging problem ===
As the World Health Organization predicted, Hong Kong will be ranked fifth in the world by 2050 for cities with the largest percentage of older adults since over 40% of its population will be 65 or above. As a result of the rapid rising of the aged population, the Hong Kong elderly are now facing the shortage of resources (e.g. housing, medical, etc.). Consequently, an increasing number of elderly go to neighbor cities in Pearl River Delta, such as Guangzhou, Shenzhen and Zhuhai for retirement. According to a survey conducted by the Hong Kong government's Census and Statistics Department in September 2011, more than 15,000 people from Hong Kong aged over 60 lived in mainland for one to six months in 2011[5].

=== Guangdong province's unique conditions ===
- Geographic factor: Guangdong province is relatively closer to Hong Kong than other provinces and thus is more convenient for the elderly to travel.
- Economic factor: The living cost (food, housing, etc.) of Guangdong is lower than Hong Kong.

Tse Shun-fa, 75, a Hong Kong pensioner who moved into a care home in Dongguan, describes that he has to spend HK$4,000 per month in Hong Kong while he only has to pay about CNY 4,000 (HK$6,300) for a 25-square-meter retirement room in Dongguan.

- Cultural factor: They share similar Cantonese cultural background with no language barrier.
- Family and historical factor: Some Hong Kong elderly were born in Guangdong and moved to Hong Kong to make a living in 1950s. These people are willing to return to hometown after retirement. In addition, numerous Hong Kong elderly moved to Guangdong to visit their relatives there.

=== Realistic situation ===
Currently, going to north for retirement offers a partial solution and releases pressure of aging problem in Hong Kong. However, rising prices and the devaluation of Hong Kong dollar have pushed some elderly to come back to Hong Kong.

== The developing history ==
- 1977, old age allowance is renamed from elderly allowance
- 2010s, for the convenience of the permanent citizens living in Guangdong, Hong Kong government prepared to carry out Guangdong scheme to guarantee equal welfare for them as those living in Hong Kong.
- 2013, Aug.1st smoothly runs on the first day and start receiving applications
- 2013, Oct.1 formally launched by Social Welfare Department
- 2013, Oct.1—2014, Sept.30, a special one-off arrangement will be in place in the first year of implementing the Guangdong Scheme

== Eligibility criteria and application procedure ==
1. The elderly should satisfy some residence, age and other requirements (e.g. no criminal record).
2. The applicants need to complete the application and post to Social Security Field Unit (Guangdong Scheme), together with some supplementary information (e.g. residential proof).
3. The staff will make an appointment for interviewing or home visiting.

As long as the applicants are approved before 1 October 2013, they can receive the monthly allowance of HK$1,135. For further detailed information, click on the link of the official website: http://www.swd.gov.hk/gds/index_e.html#s2

== Public's responses ==
The reaction of public has been strong since Guangdong Scheme carried out. From October 1, 2013 (when the social welfare department first launched the scheme) to mid-July 2014, the department received 19,000 applications and more than 16,800 seniors are already receiving the allowances.

However, while creating a trend to go to Guangdong for retirement, this scheme actually has received rather controversial comments since it was first launched.

=== Limitations & negative responses ===
As estimated by Social Welfare Department (SWD), 30,000 aged people are qualified for the applications, but they just received about 18,700 applications. This indicated the existence of people who doubted this scheme or failed to apply for it. Some commenters argued the main reason is that the process of application(as mentioned above in eligibility criteria part) is so complicated that numerous aged people fail to complete it or do not want to be bothered completing it. Moreover, even though some of the elderly successfully passed through the whole process, they will still face many problems in their further lives in mainland China. (E.g. Their special identities make it difficult for them to access medical and health services with medical insurance; the commodity price in Guangdong keeps raising in recent years and narrows the gap between Hong Kong and Guangdong. The increase of living cost in Guangdong makes Hong Kong's aged people hesitate to follow the flow of migrating.)

== Further developments ==
While numerous commenters and experts viewed this scheme as a plan to "export" the Hong Kong elderly to Guangdong for more resources, a report from South China Morning Post recently introduced another view, which regarded this scheme as a plan to "facilitate". The labor and welfare chief introduced this idea of "portable welfare" and some specific methods to achieve that. They managed to utilize two Guangdong care home facilities run by Hong Kong charities to reduce the waiting time of Hong Kong aged people to receive health care. In this way, the act of "exporting the elderly" changes to a much simpler act of "buying places". “We are breaking new grounds in terms of portability of welfare benefits," said the welfare chief. "This is an important first step - a major strategic step allowing the elderly their freedom to retire in Guangdong."

In general, this design pretends that Guangdong is Hong Kong and that has caused great controversies.

According to the latest news, the Hong Kong government has denied and rejected this design and strictly forbade establishing "little Hong Kong" in Guangdong province.

== See also ==
- Retirement Insurance Benefits
