= Raphael Wong =

Hong Kong politician and activist

- 黃浩銘
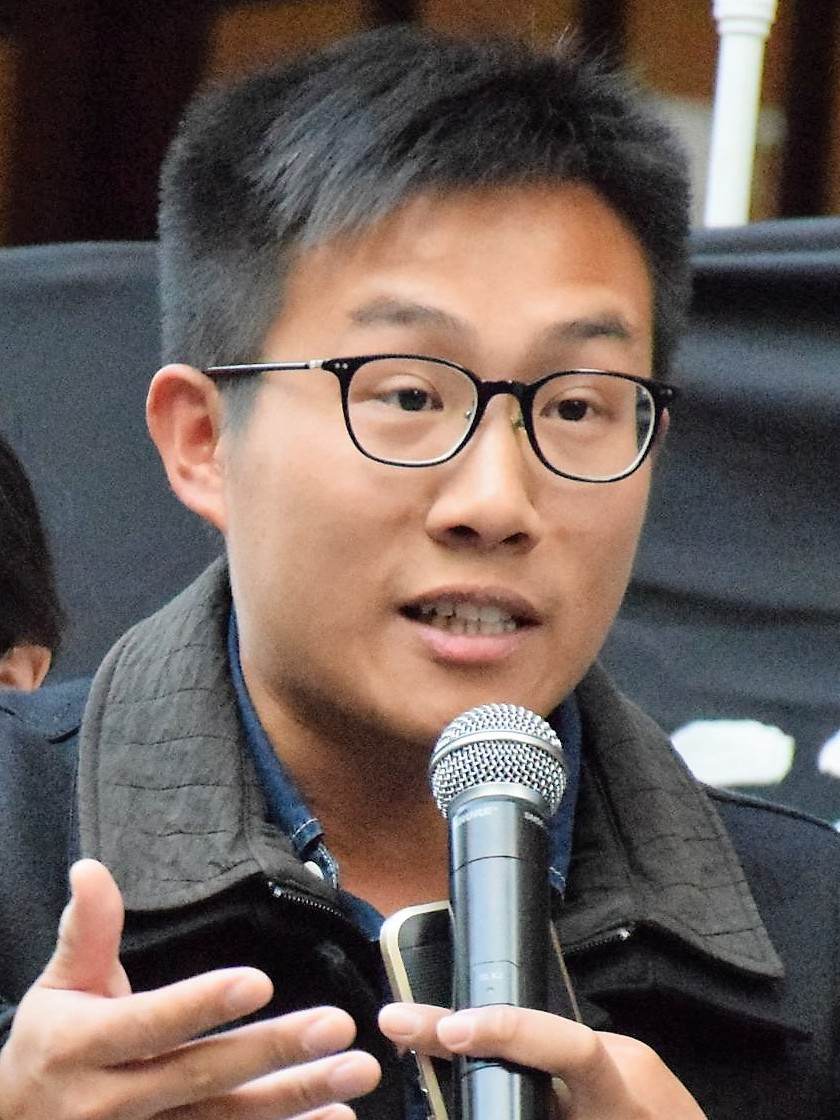
- Raphael Wong in 2017

Chairman of the League of Social Democrats
- In office 2 March 2020 – 25 July 2021
- Preceded by: Avery Ng
- Succeeded by: Chan Po-ying

Vice-chairman of the League of Social Democrats
- In office 21 February 2014 – 2 March 2020
- Preceded by: Tang Chui-chung
- Succeeded by: Leung Kwok-hung

Personal details
- Born: 24 October 1988 (age 37) Hong Kong
- Party: League of Social Democrats
- Education: Hong Kong Polytechnic University, Chinese University of Hong Kong
- Occupation: Activist

Raphael Wong Ho-ming
- Traditional Chinese: 黃浩銘
- Simplified Chinese: 黄浩铭
Transcriptions
Standard Mandarin
- Hanyu Pinyin: Huáng Hàomíng
Yue: Cantonese
- Jyutping: wong4 hou6 ming4

Raphael Wong Ho-ming (Chinese: 黃浩銘; 24 October 1988), also known by his nickname "Village Head", is a Hong Kong social activist and politician. He is formerly the chairman of the League of Social Democrats (LSD) and was one of the leaders in the 2014 Hong Kong protests.

== Early life ==
In 1988, Wong was born in Hong Kong. Wong's father is Wong Yu-choi, a pro-Beijing rural politician, a member of the Civil Force and holding the position of member of the Sha Tin Rural Committee and resident representative of the Ha Wo Che village in Sha Tin.

== Education ==
Wong attended the Shatin Pui Ying College. Wong earned a bachelor's degree in social science from the Hong Kong Polytechnic University. Wong earned a master's degree in social policy from Chinese University of Hong Kong.

== Career ==
=== Protests ===
Wong became interested in politics in the 2008 Legislative Council election, when pro-democracy League of Social Democrats (LSD) chairman Wong Yuk-man chanted "DAB the most shameless" in an election forum. He started listening to Wong's internet radio and joined the LSD despite his father's opposition. He participated in the 1 July demonstration in 2009 for the first time.

In the 2010 July 1 demonstration, he joined the sit-in at the Central Government Offices after the demonstration. On 1 July 2011, he was one of the protesters blocked the Connaught Road Central.

On 1 March 2011, Wong and another protester Wong Chun-kit protested against Chief Executive Donald Tsang when Tsang was on his way to the Hong Kong Museum of History in Tsim Sha Tsui. Wong held a box of rice with fish in corn sauce and ran towards Tsang. They were charged with hitting Tsang but later found innocent by the court.

On 29 June 2012 during Chinese President Hu Jintao's visit in Hong Kong, five LSD members including Wong protested at the North Lantau Highway where Hu's car passed by. They climbed over a metal fence, scrambling onto a slope to hold up two banners reading: "Vindication of the June 4th crackdown"; and "Give me back [Li] Wangyang". They were later charged and fined for improper use of an expressway.

In 2014, Wong became the vice-chairman of the LSD.

On 11 June 2014, Wong was charged along with Scholarism convenor Joshua Wong, former secretary general of Hong Kong Federation of Students Nathan Law and People Power legislator Albert Chan for obstructing police officers when they burnt replicas of Beijing's white paper interpreting Hong Kong's one country, two systems principle during a protest outside the Liaison Office. They were later found not guilty.

As a veteran activist, Wong was one of the leaders during the 2014 Hong Kong protests, which was often called the "Umbrella Revolution". He was deeply involved in the movement and was later arrested with Joshua Wong, the main leader of the protests and Chinese University's Student Union member Jason Szeto Tze-long on 25 November during the police clearance of the Mong Kok sit-in site.

On 18 April 2020, Wong was arrested as one of 15 Hong Kong high-profile democracy figures, on suspicion of organizing, publicizing or taking part in several unauthorized assemblies between August and October 2019 in the course of the anti-extradition bill protests. Following protocol, the police statement did not disclose the names of the accused.

On 25 July 2021, Wong was replaced by Leung Kwok-hung wife, Chan Po-ying, as the chairperson of LSD.

=== Election ===
In 2011 and 2015, Wong ran in the District Council elections in his neighborhood Lek Yuen but was both defeated. In the 2016 Legislative Council election, he will run in the New Territories West with incumbent legislator Albert Chan of the People Power standing in the second place of his ticket.

== See also ==
- Avery Ng
- Umbrella Movement

Political offices
Preceded by Tang Chui-chung	Vice-chairman of League of Social Democrats; 2016–2020	Succeeded by Leung Kwok-hung
Preceded by Avery Ng	Chairman of League of Social Democrats; 2020–2021	Succeeded by Chan Po-ying
