= League of Social Democrats =

Pro-democracy political party in Hong Kong

League of Social Democrats 社會民主連線
- Abbreviation: LSD
- Chairperson: Chan Po-ying (final)
- Founded: 1 October 2006
- Dissolved: 29 June 2025
- Headquarters: Flat B2, 4/F, Tai Cheong; Factory Building, 3 Wing Ming Street, Cheung Sha Wan, Kowloon
- Membership (2016): Over 57
- Ideology: Social democracy; Direct democracy; Left-wing populism
- Political position: Centre-left to left-wing
- Regional affiliation: Pro-democracy camp
- Colours: Red

Website
- lsd.org.hk

League of Social Democrats
- Traditional Chinese: 社會民主連線
- Simplified Chinese: 社会民主连线
Transcriptions
Standard Mandarin
- Hanyu Pinyin: Shèhuì Mínzhǔ Liánxiàn
Yue: Cantonese
- Yale Romanization: Séh wuih màhn jyú Lìhn sin
- Jyutping: Se^{5} wui^{6*2} man^{4} zyu^{2} Lin^{4} sin^{3}

The League of Social Democrats (LSD) was a social democratic party in Hong Kong. Chaired by Chan Po-ying, wife of Leung Kwok-hung, it positioned itself as the radical wing of the pro-democracy camp and stressed on "street actions" and "parliamentary struggles".

Established in 2006 by a group of pro-grassroots left-leaning activists, the party opposed the perceived moderate and compromising approach of its pro-democratic allies Democratic Party and Civic Party and called for more aggressive tactics to achieve democracy. It often found itself at odds with other pan-democrats due to its confrontational and radical activism in the Legislative Council. The party first participated in the 2008 Legislative Council election and won over the 10 per cent of the popular vote and emerged as the new force with three seats.

In 2010, the League launched the "Five Constituencies Referendum" campaign to pressure the government to implement universal suffrage no later than 2012. The plan was joined by the Civics but rejected by the Democrats. The plan to target the Democratic Party in the following District Council election, as well as personal differences, led to a devastating factional struggles between the founding chairman Wong Yuk-man and his successor Andrew To, which resulted in the Wong's faction splitting from the party to form the People Power, leaving the party with only one legislator, Leung Kwok-hung.

The party suffered a sharp decline in the 2012 Legislative Council election but resumed a cooperative relationship with the People Power in the issues such as filibustering in the legislature and street activisms. Facing the rise of localism, the two parties formed an electoral coalition in the 2016 Legislative Council election which received seven per cent of the vote with Leung Kwok-hung being re-elected. Leung was subsequently disqualified over his oath-taking manner in 2017, leaving the party without any elected representation.

In the massive pro-democracy protests in 2019, its party member Jimmy Sham, who was also the convenor of the Civil Human Rights Front (CHRF), won one of two seats for the party in the following District Council election, and also won the nomination in the 2020 pro-democracy primaries where Leung Kwok-hung failed to secure a nomination. The party was dissolved in June 2025, amidst the political crackdown from the government.

== Party beliefs ==
The LSD was considered to be the "radical wing" of the pro-democracy camp by its political beliefs and tactics. It was formed by legislators, social activists and grassroots residents. It aims to be a "clear-cut opposition party" and defend the interests of the grassroots. It opposes the wealth inequality created by collusions between the government and corporations. It positions itself as a social democratic party and believes that a just society can be achieved by redistribution of wealth, economic interventionism and direct democracy.

== Tactics ==
=== Protests ===
Members of the party pioneered the use of theatrics and disruptive tactics in Hong Kong. Heckling and the throwing of projectiles have since become a frequent occurrence at Legislative Council and public meetings. Their members have been ejected from LegCo meetings on numerous occasions. At a Legislative council meeting on 15 October 2008, during the Policy Address given by then Chief Executive Donald Tsang, party chairman Wong Yuk-man threw a banana at Tsang in protest at the means test of "fruit money" (Old Age Allowance) for the elderly.

At the opening of an exhibition at the Museum of History on 2 March 2011, Steve Wong Chun-kit, member of the League of Social Democrats rushed at Donald Tsang. Protesters also threw cooked rice at Tsang, as a symbol of the plight of the poor, but missed him. Tsang said his chest was hit by the protestor and had a medical check at the Queen Mary Hospital afterwards. Tsang denounced the protest, saying that violence was unacceptable in Hong Kong, where civilised behaviour and the rule of law were fundamental values. However Leung Kwok-hung said he did not see any physical contact between Tsang and protesters. Steve Wong was arrested and released on bail.

At CY Leung's first question-and-answer session as Chief Executive at the Legislative Council in Hong Kong on 16 July 2012, "Long Hair" Leung Kwok-hung threw an effigy of Pinocchio at CY Leung.

Leung Kwok-hung threw a cloud-shaped cushion at Financial Secretary John Tsang during his budget report in the Legislative Council on 27 February 2013 to demand for a universal retirement protection scheme.

At a political forum on 7 December 2013, one member was captured by the media throwing a Lufsig, a cuddly toy wolf at CY Leung.

=== Filibusters ===
In May 2012, Leung Kwok-hung, the only LSD member in the Legislative Council joined a weeks-long filibuster staged by Albert Chan and Wong Yuk-man, who were LSD legislators but defected to the People Power, submitting 1306 amendments altogether to the Legislative Council (Amendment) Bill 2012, by which the government attempted to forbid resigning lawmakers from participating in by-elections as the government's response to the "Five Constituency Referendum movement" launched by the LSD in 2010. On the morning of 17 May 2012, Jasper Tsang Yok-sing, President of the Legislative Council adopt Article 92 of the Standing Order, which allows the president follow foreign parliament rules for unregulated behaviours to terminate the debate. In the end, all amendments were defeated and the Bill was passed.

In May 2013, the LSD and People Power staged a month-long filibuster by moving a total of 710 amendments on the Budget Appropriation Bill debate, to press for a universal pension scheme and a HK$10,000 cash handout to be included in John Tsang's budget. The government warned that the service would shut down if the budget bill do not pass. Jasper Tsang ordered to end the filibuster on 13 May after 55 hours spent to debate 17 of the 148 amendments. The Appropriation Bill was passed on 21 May 2013 with 684 amendments negatived.

== History ==
=== Founding and early years (2006–10) ===
The LSD was founded on 1 October 2006. The two Legislative Councillors, Leung Kwok-hung, activist from the April Fifth Action Group, and Albert Chan, former Democratic Party member, were the founding members. Radio host, author and former journalism professor Wong Yuk-man became the first Chairman of the party.

In the participation in the 2007 Chief Executive Election of Alan Leong, the League of Social Democrats refused to co-operate with the Democratic Party and the Civic Party and criticised the two parties for nominating Leong as Chief Executive candidate, saying that they are not qualified as democrats. In the 2006 Election Committee election, the League was criticised by media for refusing to name a candidate in protest at the "small-circle election".

The LSD won six seats its first attempt in the election in the 2007 District Council elections. In late December 2007, the Vice-Chairman of the party, Lo Wing-lok, resigned after a controversy over the lack of documentation on the lease of the party headquarters. According to Lo, the premises belonged to an alleged triad member who claimed to be a merchant.

In the 2008 LegCo elections, the party emerged as the sixth largest party in the legislature by gaining over 10 percent of the vote and winning total of three seats with chairman Wong Yuk-man winning a seat in the Kowloon West geographical constituency and Leung Kwok-hung and Albert Chan retained their seats respectively. The LSD fiercely criticised the other democratic parties during the campaign. In Kowloon East Andrew To Kwan-hang has accused the Democratic Party of wrongly backing the government's move to privatise the Link Reit Investment Trust, thus paving the way for hefty rent rises in public housing commercial and parking facilities. In Kowloon West, Wong Yuk-man lambasted the Civic Party's Claudia Mo in the same way he did the candidates from the pro-Beijing, pro-government flagship party, the Democratic Alliance for the Betterment and Progress of Hong Kong (DAB), accusing the Civic Party of applying double standards in its fight for democracy, and being elitist.

=== 2010 electoral reform and splits (2010–16) ===
The party was a member of the Alliance for Universal Suffrage which consisted of all the pro-democracy groups to strive for the 2012 universal suffrage of the Chief Executive and Legislative Council. In response to the electoral reform package proposed by the government, the party joined hand with the Civic Party to launch the "Five Constituency Referendum" by having five legislators resigning and participating in a territory-wide by-election to demand genuine universal suffrage. The claim of by-election as referendum expectedly received severe attacks from the Beijing government and the pro-Beijing camp in Hong Kong as unconstitutional. The Democratic Party refused to join the movement and sought for a less confrontational way to negotiate with Beijing. The movement was considered as failure with only 17.7 percent of the registered voters voted despite all three LSD legislators successfully returned to the LegCo. The LSD strongly criticised the Democratic Party for its move to negotiate with Beijing and voted for the reform package and attacked the Democratic Party in the following 2010 July 1 march.

The party was also heavily devastated from the intra-party struggles. The former chairman Wong Yuk-man disagreed with the policies of the incumbent chairman Andrew To including the ways of dealing with the Democratic Party. In November 2010, Wong Yuk-man's protege Edward Yum led a no-confidence motion against To which was defeated by 111 to 170 at an extraordinary general party meeting. After the failure of toppling To's chairmanship, on 24 January 2011, two of the three legislators of the party, Wong Yuk-man and Albert Chan quit the party with many party's leading figures, citing disagreement with leader Andrew To and his faction. About two hundreds of their supporters joined them, leaving the LSD in disarray. Wong and Chan formed the People Power with other defected members and radical groups which aimed at sniping Democratic Party in the upcoming 2011 District Council elections.

The party lost all its seats in the District Councils in the District Council elections in November, all four of the party's seats were swept by the pro-Beijing candidates, including that of Andrew To for Chuk Yuen North constituency. 23 other League candidates also failed to win. Two days later, Andrew To resigned as chairman, to take responsibility for the loss, but pledged not to alter the LSD's ideology for the sake of winning elections. Leung Kwok-hung replaced To as the Chairman of the LSD.

=== Ousted from legislature (2016–20) ===
In February 2016, the party selected its sixth Executive Committee and new leaders. Avery Ng succeeded Leung as the new chairman and Raphael Wong and Derek Chan Tak-cheung as vice-chairman.

In the 2016 Legislative Council election, the LSD formed an electoral alliance with another radical democrat People Power as they were facing serious challenges from the newly emerging radical localist camp. The alliance won two seats in total with sole League legislator Leung Kwok-hung and People Power's Ray Chan being re-elected in the New Territories East. Former LSD legislator Albert Chan failed to help LSD's Raphael Wong to be elected despite him standing as a second candidate in the New Territories West. LSD chairman Avery Ng also lost his bid in Kowloon West.

In the 2017 Chief Executive election, LSD legislator Leung Kwok-hung launched his Chief Executive bid in February 2017 through a "public nomination" mechanism, in which he would seek to secure 37,790 votes from members of the public, one per cent of the city's registered voters before he would canvass for the nominations from the Election Committee. Leung dropped out from the race on 25 February after failed to gain enough nominations from the public, secured only 20,234 nominations.

In July 2017, Leung Kwok-hung was unseated with three other pro-democracy legislators due to their manners at the oath-taking ceremony at the inaugural meeting, where Leung had used it as a platform to protest since he was first elected in 2004, which made the LSD lost its only seat in the legislature.

In 2019, in the aftermath of the massive Hong Kong pro-democracy protests two prominent members of LSD namely, political and LGBT activist Jimmy Sham and Citizens' Radio founder Tsang Kin-shing were elected in the 2019 District Council elections as part of the electoral landslide by the pro-democracy camp. In spite of this, Leung Kwok-hung was narrowly defeated in his bid to unseat incumbent lawmaker Starry Lee in the To Kwa Wan North in the Kowloon City District Council.

=== Security law and crackdown (2020–25) ===
On 6 January 2021, vice-chair persons of the party Leung Kwok-hung and Jimmy Sham were arrested for violation of the national security law. They were released on bail the next day but charged with subversion on 28 February 2021. As of 12 March 2021, both Leung and Sham remain in custody after being denied bail twice and were in prison until their next hearing on the case on 31 May 2021. On 31 May, the court postponed further court proceedings until 8 July 2021. Both Leung and Sham (along with the rest of defendants) will be presented with evidence before 28 June and they will be able to enter a plea. Otherwise, their case will be referred to the High Court.

Chan Po-ying, Leung Kwok-hung's wife, was elected as the LSD's new chairperson during a special meeting on 25 July 2021, replacing Raphael Wong. Dickson Chau was also elected as vice chairman (external affairs), replacing Leung Kwok-hung, who was jailed for his role in the 2019 protests.

On 1 June 2021, the party's leader Raphael Wong announced that the party will not participate in the upcoming legislative election after accusing the Chinese Communist Party of "wiping out dissidents". The move comes after the party is almost decimated after the arrests of Leung Kwok-hung, Jimmy Sham and Avery Ng.

=== Dissolution ===
LSD is described as the last active party of the rump pro-democracy bloc after allies were forced to disband or turn silent following crackdown on the pro-democracy camp. The party continued its small-scale, occasional street activism, such as street booth activities calling for labour rights and one-man commemorations of Tiananmen massacre. Pressure grew and the party faced dozens of charges and fines including "illegal fundraising". In 2021, Raphael Wong was jailed for unauthorised assembly and Chan Po-ying became the new leader of the party. After taking the realm of the protest group, Chan was under increasing police surveillance. On one occasion she and other members were briefly detained by the police when hiking, and on another they were surrounded by dozens of police officers at rallies. The party was also contacted by the authorities "suggesting" they do not petition to the government on politically sensitive dates.

On 25 June 2025 local media reported that "middle men" had reached LSD three times throughout the past six months, demanding the party to dissolve by 1 July or face serious consequences, although LSD had said they were not requested to disband when the Democratic Party announced plans to disbandment in April. After consulting party members including Leung Kwok-hung, Chan Po-ying announced the dissolution of the party on 29 June 2025, citing immense political pressure from the government throughout the national security crackdown since 2020. The party chair declined to disclose further details concerning their decision. With the end of LSD, the pro-democracy camp is considered to have come to an end, without any active political groups.

== Performance in elections ==
=== Chief Executive elections ===
Election	Candidate	# of votes	% of vote
2017	Leung Kwok-hung	Not nominated	

=== Legislative Council elections ===
Election	Number of popular votes	% of popular votes	GC seats	FC seats	EC seats	Total seats	+/−	Position
2008	153,390	10.12	3	0		3 / 60	1▲	6th
2012	87,997▼	4.86▼	1	0		1 / 70	0	10th▼
2016	PP/LSD ticket		1	0		1 / 70	0	10th▲
2021	Boycotted		0	0	0	0 / 90	1▼	N/A

=== District Council elections ===
Election	Number of popular votes	% of popular votes	Total elected seats	+/−
2007	28,601	2.51	6 / 405	0
2011	21,833▼	1.85▼	0 / 412	5▼
2015	6,526▼	0.45▼	0 / 431	0
2019	8,384▲	0.29▼	2 / 452	2▲

== Leadership ==
=== Chairpersons ===
- Wong Yuk-man, 2006–10
- Andrew To Kwan-hang, 2010–11
  - Tang Chui-chung, acting 2011–12
- Leung Kwok-hung, 2012–16
- Avery Ng Man-yuen, 2016–20
- Raphael Wong Ho-ming, 2020–21
- Chan Po-ying, 2021–25

=== Vice-chairpersons (External Affairs) ===
- Lo Wing-lok, 2006–07
- Andrew To Kwan-hang, 2008–10
- Avery Ng Man-yuen, 2012–16
- Raphael Wong Ho-ming, 2016–20
- Leung Kwok-hung, 2020–21
- Dickson Chau Ka-faat, 2021–25

=== Vice-chairpersons (Internal Affairs) ===
- Michael Mak Kwok-fung, 2006–2010
- Lee Wai-yee, 2008–2010
- Avery Ng Man-yuen, 2010–2012
- Tang Chui-chung, 2012–2014
- Raphael Wong Ho-ming, 2014–2016
- Derek Chan Tak-cheung, 2016
- Jaco Chow Nok-hang, 2018–2020
- Jimmy Sham Tsz-kit, 2020–21
- Yu Wai-pun, 2021–25

== See also ==
- Socialism in Hong Kong
- Socialist Action (Hong Kong)
- People Power (Hong Kong)
