= Andrew To =

Hong Kong politician and activist

Andrew To Kwan-hang
- 陶君行
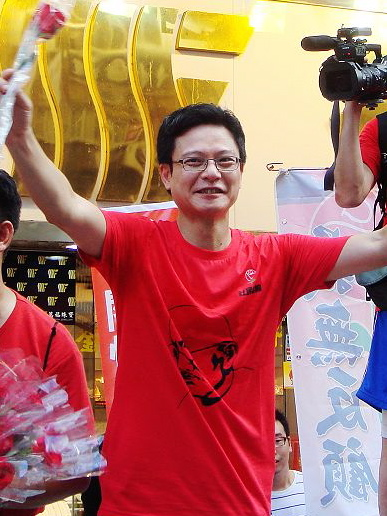

Chairman of the League of Social Democrats
- In office 1 February 2010 – 8 November 2011
- Preceded by: Wong Yuk-man
- Succeeded by: Tang Tsui-chung (acting)

Member of the Wong Tai Sin District Council
- In office 1 April 1991 – 31 December 2011

Secretary-General of the Hong Kong Federation of Students
- In office 1989–1990
- Succeeded by: Richard Tsoi

Personal details
- Born: 7 February 1966 (age 60)
- Party: United Democrats (1990–94); Democratic Party (1994–2002); Social Democratic Forum (2000–02); The Frontier (2002–06); League of Social Democrats (2006–2025)
- Spouse: Jackie Hung
- Education: La Salle Primary School; La Salle College; Lingnan University

Andrew To
- Traditional Chinese: 陶君行
Transcriptions
Yue: Cantonese
- Yale Romanization: Tòuh Gwān hàhng
- Jyutping: Tou^{4} Gwan^{1} hang^{4}

Andrew To Kwan-hang (Chinese: 陶君行; born 7 February 1966) is a Hong Kong politician and activist. He is the former chairman of the League of Social Democrats and former member of the Wong Tai Sin District Council.

== Early life, education and student activism ==
Of Hakka ancestry, To was born in Hong Kong in 1966 and was raised in Choi Hung Estate. He was educated at the La Salle Primary School and the La Salle College. He was the president of the student union when he attended the Lingnan College and was the secretary-general of the Hong Kong Federation of Students from 1989 to 1990. During the Tiananmen Square protests of 1989 and he once went to Beijing to join the hunger strike.

== United Democrats and Democratic Party ==
After the protest, he became the founding member of the United Democrats of Hong Kong, the united front of the pro-democracy forces in Hong Kong. In the 1991 District Board election, he became the youngest person to be elected to the Wong Tai Sin District Board, which he kept the position until 2011 when he was ousted.

He represented the radical "Young Turks" faction in the Democratic Party, after it merged the United Democrats and the moderate Meeting Point, against the Meeting Point faction. In December 1998, he staged a successful coup d'état in the party leadership election, which promptly brought the party into a phase of factional struggle. The Young Turks formed their own list of about ten candidates to run for the Central Committee and nominated Lau Chin-shek to run for vice-chairman against the former Meeting Point chairman Anthony Cheung. Hoping to make Lau as their factional leader, he would lead the party from the Meeting Point faction's pro-middle class, pro-laissez-faire and pro-Beijing positions to a more pro-grassroots position. Although Lau was elected vice-chairman, he resigned after the election.

In a general meeting in September 1999, the To-led Young Turks also proposed to put the minimum wage legislation on the 2000 LegCo election platform of the party. The Mainstreamers which included the "triumvirate", Yeung Sum, Cheung Man-kwong and Lee Wing-tat, saw the minimum wage debate was a challenge to the party authority and decide to fight back by joining hands with the Meeting Point faction to defeat the Young Turks. Andrew To wrote a newspaper article accusing the Mainstreamers of suppressing intra-party dissent, "just like the butchers in the Tiananmen massacre." To's comment led to a backlash of opinion within the party and led to the defeat of the minimum wage motion. The debate, largely took place in the mass media, publicised the factional rivalries and created a bad image within the party. To later on left the party in 2002 and formed the Social Democratic Forum, which later merged into The Frontier, where he was the secretary-general of the party until 2006.

== League of Social Democrats ==
In 2006, he co-founded the League of Social Democrats (LSD) with other activists including legislators Albert Chan and Leung Kwok-hung and radio host Wong Yuk-man with a "clearcut" pro-grassroots stance and opposition party image. To exchanged fire with the Democratic Party over the "Five Constituencies Referendum" campaign, in which the LSD proposed to have five legislators resigning from all five geographical constituencies to trigger a de facto referendum to pressure the government to implement universal suffrage, in which the Democratic Party disapproved but the Civic Party joined. On 1 February 2010, LSD founding chairman Wong Yuk-man stepped down and To succeeded as the party chairman.

The tension between the To and Wong factions worsened by the late 2010 as Wong disagreed with the policies of To and his faction, including his disapproval of sniping the Democratic Party in the upcoming 2011 District Council election, which To thought it would benefit the pro-Beijing camp. In November 2010, Wong Yuk-man's protege Edward Yum led a no-confidence motion against To at an extraordinary general party meeting in which To survived the motion by 170 to 111. As a result, two of the three legislators of the party, Wong Yuk-man and Albert Chan quit the party with many party's leading figures on 24 January 2011, about two hundreds of their supporters joined them, leaving the LSD in disarray. In the 2011 District Council election, he lost his seat in Chuk Yuen North to a new face Roy Tin. He resigned as the LSD chairman as a result.

== Personal life ==
He was active in sports and school sport competitions when he was young. His wife, Jackie Hung, was a leader of Civil Human Rights Front and Justice and Peace Commission of the Hong Kong Catholic Diocese.

Political offices
Preceded by ???	Secretary General of Hong Kong Federation of Students; 1989–1990	Succeeded by Richard Tsoi
New constituency	Member of Wong Tai Sin District Council; Representative for Chuk Yuen Central; 1991–2003	Constituency abolished
Preceded by Ho Hon-man	Member of Wong Tai Sin District Council; Representative for Chuk Yuen North; 2004–2011	Succeeded by Roy Ting
Party political offices
Preceded by Ivy Chan	Secretary-General of The Frontier; 2003–2006	Succeeded by Yan Sun-kong
New political party	Secretary-General of League of Social Democrats; 2006–2008	Succeeded by Foo Wai-lok
Preceded by Lo Wing-lok	Vice-Chairman of League of Social Democrats; 2008–2010	Succeeded by Vacant
Preceded by Wong Yuk-man	Chairman of League of Social Democrats; 2010–2011	Succeeded by Leung Kwok-hung
