= Old Age Allowance =

Hong Kong government programme

- Traditional Chinese: 高齡津貼
- Simplified Chinese: 高龄津贴
Transcriptions
Standard Mandarin
- Hanyu Pinyin: Gāolíng jīntiē
Yue: Cantonese
- Yale Romanization: Gōu lìhng jēun tip
- Jyutping: Gou1 ling4 zoen1 tip3

Fruit money
- Chinese: 生果金
Transcriptions
Yue: Cantonese
- Yale Romanization: Sāang gwó gām
- Jyutping: Saang1 gwo2 gam1

Old Age Allowance (OAA), colloquially known as fruit money, is a Hong Kong government programme introduced in 1973 which provides monthly payments of $1,290 to elderly Hong Kong residents. There is no means test for the Higher Old Age Allowance given to recipients of age 70 or above. The Normal Old Age Allowance (NOAA) for elderly residents between the ages of 65 and 69 was only offered to people who fell below certain income and asset thresholds, but since 2013 such people are now covered by the similar but separate Old Age Living Allowance scheme instead.

== Residence requirement ==
OAA recipients were originally required to have been absent from Hong Kong for no more than 56 days in the year prior to the date of their application, and to be present in Hong Kong for 125 days per year thereafter. The latter limit was relaxed to 60 days in 2011, but this still meant that people who had retired in mainland China or abroad and did not often return to Hong Kong were ineligible. A 2012 challenge to these residence requirements before Judge Johnson Lam in the Court of First Instance failed. In his ruling, Lam suggested that the applicant apply for the means-tested Portable Comprehensive Social Security Assistance (CSSA) instead.

In 2013, the Social Welfare Department began accepting applications for OAA from Hong Kong residents who lived in Guangdong. However, receipt of payments continued to require an account at a Hong Kong bank, which proved difficult for some recipients whose banks told them they could not maintain an account without a Hong Kong address.

== Means testing ==
Recipients of Normal Old Age Allowance between 65 and 69 have long been required to meet a means test; however, attempts to introduce a broader means test as a trade-off for increasing the OAA have proven politically controversial. In 2008, when the OAA was HK$625 per month, Chief Executive Donald Tsang faced calls to raise the allowance to at least HK$1,000 per month, and proposed a means test in response. However, public opinion was strongly against such a means test, with some elderly recipients saying they would prefer the continuation of lower payments instead; they saw the payments as too small to constitute a living allowance in either case, and thought of them simply as a "token of appreciation" for their decades of contributions to Hong Kong society. Eventually, Tsang was forced to withdraw his proposal for a means test.

In July 2012, Chief Executive C. Y. Leung announced the new Old Age Living Allowance, which would provide monthly payments of HK$2,200, roughly double the existing OAA, to applicants who met a means test. By June 2013, three months after the OALA scheme had begun, there were more than 310,000 recipients, mostly former NOAA recipients between the ages of 65 and 69 who had been automatically converted to the new OALA scheme.

== See also ==
- Guangdong Scheme
