= List of vice-chancellors and presidents of the degree-awarding tertiary institutions in Hong Kong =

The Chief Executive of Hong Kong is ex officio the chancellor of all publicly funded universities in Hong Kong. The Chief Executive is also the president of The Hong Kong Academy for Performing Arts and chancellor of The Open University of Hong Kong. As the ceremonial head of these institutions, the Chief Executive may participate in ceremonial occasions, such as congregation and the conferral of degrees, and has the power to appoint a portion of the members of the university councils.

In emulation of the British system, the chancellor is expected to refrain from interfering in the academic affairs of the universities, with day-to-day management of the universities overseen by a vice-chancellor, who is the chief executive of the university.

== Degree-awarding institutions ==
The following is a list of the current vice-chancellors of the 22 degree-awarding institutions in Hong Kong.

=== UGC-funded universities (8) ===
- President of the City University of Hong Kong (Kuo Way, JP)
- President and Vice-Chancellor of the Hong Kong Baptist University (Roland T Chin, BBS, JP)
- President of Lingnan University (Leonard Cheng, BBS, JP)
- Vice-Chancellor/President of the Chinese University of Hong Kong (Rocky Tuan, SBS, JP)
- President of the Hong Kong Polytechnic University (Timothy W Tong, JP)
- President of the Hong Kong University of Science and Technology (Tony F Chan, JP)
- Vice-Chancellor and President of the University of Hong Kong (Xiang Zhang)
- President of The Hong Kong Institute of Education (Anthony Cheung, GBS, JP)

=== Private universities (4) ===
- President of the Open University of Hong Kong (Wong Yuk-shan, BBS, JP)
- President of the Hong Kong Shue Yan University (Henry Hu)
- President of the Caritas Francis Hsu College (Dr Kim Mak)
- The Hang Seng University of Hong Kong (HSUHK)

=== Publicly-funded institutions (1) ===
- Director of The Hong Kong Academy of Performing Arts (Adrian Walter)

=== Privately-funded institutions (9) ===
- President of the Chu Hai College of Higher Education (Chen Zhi)
- Tung Wah College (TWC)
- UOW College Hong Kong (UOWCHK)
- Technological and Higher Education Institute of Hong Kong, Vocational Training Council (VTC-THEi)
- Centennial College
- Gratia Christian College
- Yew Chung College of Early Childhood Education
- Hong Kong Nang Yan College of Higher Education
- HKCT Institute of Higher Education

== Long service ==
Since the development of the university sector in Hong Kong (The University of Hong Kong 1887) a small number of Vice-Chancellors (President, Director) have served for 15 years or more. They include:

16 years: Poon Chung-kwong GBS OBE(Hong Kong Polytechnic 1991-2008);

15 years: Sir Lindsay Ride CBE (Hong Kong 1949-64), Li Choh-ming KBE (Chinese University of Hong Kong 1963-78), Henry Hu (Hong Kong Shue Yan 2007-ff), Way Kuo (City 2008-23).

== See also ==
- List of vice-chancellors of the University of Hong Kong
- List of presidents and vice-chancellors of the Chinese University of Hong Kong
