= Higher education in Hong Kong =

Higher education in Hong Kong means any education higher than secondary education, including professional, technical, and academic. It is the highest level of education in Hong Kong, regulated under the Hong Kong Law.

== Admission ==
Joint University Programmes Admissions System (JUPAS) is a scheme and the main route of application designed to assist students with Hong Kong Diploma of Secondary Education (HKDSE) or Hong Kong Advanced Level Examination (HKALE) results to apply for admission to the universities in Hong Kong.

== Institutions ==
According to the Education Bureau, Hong Kong has 22 degree-awarding higher education institutions, including:

=== UGC funded universities ===
Below universities funded under the University Grants Committee (UGC):

- The University of Hong Kong (HKU, founded in 1911) – University of Hong Kong Ordinance (Cap. 1053)
- The Chinese University of Hong Kong (CUHK, founded in 1963) – The Chinese University of Hong Kong Ordinance (Cap. 1109)
- The Hong Kong University of Science and Technology (HKUST, founded in 1991) – The Hong Kong University of Science and Technology Ordinance (Cap. 1141)
- The Hong Kong Polytechnic University (PolyU, founded in 1937, granted university status in November 1994) – The Hong Kong Polytechnic University Ordinance (Cap. 1075)
- City University of Hong Kong (CityU, founded in 1984, granted university status in November 1994) – City University of Hong Kong Ordinance (Cap. 1132)
- Hong Kong Baptist University (HKBU, founded in 1956, granted university status in November 1994) – Hong Kong Baptist University Ordinance (Cap. 1126)
- Lingnan University (LU, founded in 1967 as Lingnan School in Hong Kong, granted university status in July 1999) – Lingnan University Ordinance (Cap. 1165)
- The Education University of Hong Kong (EdUHK, founded in 1994, granted university status in May 2016) – The Education University of Hong Kong Ordinance (Cap. 444)

=== Self-financing institutions ===
Statutory university

- Hong Kong Metropolitan University (HKMU; known as the Open University of Hong Kong, OUHK; founded in 1989, granted university status in May 1997) – The Open University of Hong Kong Ordinance (Cap. 1145)

Approved post secondary colleges

Approved post secondary colleges are educational institutes registered under the Post Secondary Colleges Ordinance (Cap. 320). This type of colleges are allowed to give out academic awards at bachelor's degree level or above as well as to include the Chinese words "學院" or "大學", or the English word "University" in the registration name with prior approval from the Chief Executive-in-Council (Before 1 August 2025) or Secretary for Education (Starting from 1 August 2025).

- Hong Kong Shue Yan University (HKSYU, founded in 1971, granted university status in December 2006)
- Hang Seng University of Hong Kong (HSUHK, founded in 1980, granted university status in October 2018)
- Saint Francis University (previously Caritas Institute of Higher Education, granted university status in January 2024)
- Chu Hai College of Higher Education
- HKCT Institute of Higher Education
- Tung Wah College
- Centennial College
- Gratia Christian College
- Hong Kong Nang Yan College of Higher Education
- Technological and Higher Education Institute of Hong Kong, Vocational Training Council
- UOW College Hong Kong

=== Publicly funded institutions ===
Statutory institution

- The Hong Kong Academy for Performing Arts (HKAPA, founded in 1984) – The Hong Kong Academy for Performing Arts Ordinance (Cap.1135)

== Ranking ==
QS World University Rankings and Times Higher Education–QS World University Rankings	Times Higher Education World University Rankings
View source data.	View source data.

QS World University Rankings
Institution	2010/11	2011/12	2012/13	2013/14	2014/15	2015/16	2016/17	2018	2019	2020	2021	2022	2023	2024	2025	2026
HKU	23	22	23	26	28	30	27	26	25	25	22	22	21	26	17	11
CUHK	42	37	40	39	46	51	44	46	49	46	43	39	38	47	36	32
HKUST	40	40	33	34	40	28	36	30	37	32	27	34	40	60	47	44
CityU	129	110	95	104	108	57	55	49	55	52	48	53	54	70	62	63
PolyU	166	177	159	161	162	116	111	95	106	91	75	66	65	65	57	54
HKBU	342	243	271	288	318	281	278	299	277	261	264	287	281	295	252	244
LU	—N/a	—N/a	—N/a	551–600	601–650	601–650	601–650	551–600	601–650	591–600	571–580	581–590	601–650	641–650	711–720	701–710
HKMU	—N/a	—N/a	—N/a	—N/a	—N/a	—N/a	—N/a	—N/a	—N/a	—N/a	—N/a	—N/a	—N/a	—N/a	—N/a	781–790

Times Higher Education World University Rankings
Institution	2010/11	2011/12	2012/13	2013/14	2014/15	2015/16	2016/17	2018	2019	2020	2021	2022	2023	2024	2025	2026
HKU	21	34	35	43	43	44	43	40	36	35	39	30	31	35	35	33
CUHK	—N/a	151	124	109	129	138	76	58	53	57	56	49	45	53	44	41
HKUST	41	62	65	57	51	59	49	44	41	47	56	66	58	64	66	58
CityU	—N/a	193	182	201–225	192	201–250	119	119	110	126	126	151	99	82	78	73
PolyU	149	251–275	251–275	251–275	201–225	201–250	192	182	159	171	129	91	79	87	84	80
EdU	—N/a	—N/a	—N/a	—N/a	—N/a	—N/a	—N/a	—N/a	—N/a	—N/a	—N/a	—N/a	—N/a	—N/a	—N/a	195
HKBU	111	276–300	301–350	301–350	301–350	351–400	351–400	401–500	401–500	401–500	351–400	401–500	501–600	301–350	251–330	201–250
LU	—N/a	—N/a	—N/a	—N/a	—N/a	—N/a	—N/a	—N/a	—N/a	—N/a	—N/a	—N/a	—N/a	—N/a	—N/a	301–350

QS University Rankings: Asia
Institution	2009	2010	2011	2012	2013	2014	2015	2016	2018	2019	2021	2022	2023	2024	2025	2026
HKU	1	1	2	3	2	3	2	2	5	2	4	3	4	2	2	1
CUHK	2	4	5	5	7	6	6	8	10	9	13	11	12	10	6	7
HKUST	4	2	1	1	1	5	5	4	3	7	8	9	14	15	11	6
CityU	18	15	15	12	12	11	9	7	8	21	18	20	23	17	10	7
PolyU	38	30	30	26	25	27	27	29	27	31	25	25	26	23	17	10
HKBU	73	45	49	48	43	45	51	64	64	65	64	66	68	64	71	53
LU	>200	191–200	151–160	121	115	128	142	109	100	123	120	131	152	167	188	181
HKMU	—N/a	—N/a	—N/a	—N/a	—N/a	—N/a	—N/a	—N/a	—N/a	—N/a	—N/a	—N/a	—N/a	701–750	541–560	393

QS World University Rankings by Subject
Institution	2016 (Top 20)	2017 (Top 100)	2018 (Top 20)	2018 Best subject of this institute	The highest ranking of this subject in Hong Kong (2018)
The University of Hong Kong	29	37	10	1st:Dentistry	The University of Hong Kong (1st)
The Chinese University of Hong Kong	17	30	1	20th:Communication & Media Studies	The Chinese University of Hong Kong (20th)
The Hong Kong University of Science and Technology	12	16	4	14th:Computer Science & Information Systems	The Hong Kong University of Science and Technology (14th)
City University of Hong Kong	7	18	0	26th:Linguistics	The University of Hong Kong (11th)
The Hong Kong Polytechnic University	8	16	3	3rd:Hospitality & Leisure Management	The Hong Kong Polytechnic University (3rd)
Hong Kong Baptist University	0	2	0	51-100th: Communication & Media Studies	The Chinese University of Hong Kong (20th)
The Education University of Hong Kong	1	1	1	9th:Education & Training	The University of Hong Kong (7th)
The Hong Kong Academy for Performing Arts	0	1	0	50-100th:Performing Arts	The University of Hong Kong (44th)

Notes:

- UGC is the abbreviation of University Grants Committee.
- HKCAAVQ is the abbreviation of Hong Kong Council for Accreditation of Academic and Vocational Qualifications (formerly HKCAA).
- Programme Area Accreditation means the programme operator can operate specific programmes at designated subject areas and academic levels during specific period, granted and reviewed by HKCAAVQ. Prior notice and individual accreditation to HKCAAVQ are not required.
- Honour diploma (academically equivalent to higher diploma and associate degree in Hong Kong, and equivalent to bachelor's degree in some countries) was an academic award issued by colleges or institutes before they were granted full university status, such as HKBU, LU and SYU. It is no longer awarded.

== See also ==
- Education in Hong Kong
- Medical education in Hong Kong
- Joint University Programmes Admissions System
- Self-financing Higher Education in Hong Kong
- Hong Kong
