= Self-financing Higher Education in Hong Kong =

Self-Financing Higher Education in Hong Kong refers to educational programmes at the sub-degree level and above provided by local self-financing entities. Since the government announced the target of enabling 60% of secondary school graduates to receive higher education, the self-financing post-secondary education sector has experienced significant expansion with the aim of accommodating the emerging needs of the society.

== Background ==
=== Changing needs of knowledge-based economy ===
The emergence of knowledge-based economy has often been highlighted by the government in explaining its initiatives in the Higher Education sector. The changing manpower needs of a knowledge-based economy increases the demand for higher education around the world. As a knowledge-based economy depends upon knowledge and its agile applications, it requires an educated population and the corresponding massification of post-secondary education.

=== Massification since 1990s ===
During the early period of British colonial rule, higher education served as a platform for the British Empire to train Chinese elites who were likely to become government officials in the future. Only 2579 students (2.2% of the relevant age groups) were enrolled as first-year students in local university degree programmes in 1980.

However, the higher education sector began to experience rapid massification since the 1990s. The most significant move in massification is encapsulated by the Chief Executive's policy in 2000, which sets the target of raising the participation rate in post-secondary education from 33% to 60% in ten years’ time. The objective has been achieved in the middle of the decade due to the rapid expansion of the self-financing post-secondary institutions.

=== Growth of self-financing institutions ===
In 2017, 61,600 secondary school graduates attended the Hong Kong Diploma of Secondary Education (HKDSE) Examination. Around 28,000 achieved results that met the admission criteria for a university degree, while only 12,700 of them could enrol in the government-funded degree programmes offered by eight universities in Hong Kong through the Joint University Programmes Admission System (JUPAS). Given the large number of academically qualified candidates, the government-funded bachelor's degree cannot provide sufficient places for the graduates, which gives the self-financing institutions a crucial role in meeting the rising demand.

== Modes of operation ==
=== Publicly funded post-secondary education institutions ===
They offer programmes through their self-financing continuing and professional education arms or member institutions under their aegis. These institutions include the eight UGC-funded institutions, and the Hong Kong Academy of Performing Arts.

=== Self-financing post-secondary institutions ===
These institutions include:

1. The seven approved post-secondary colleges registered under the Post-Secondary Colleges Ordinance (Cap. 320), including
  - Caritas Institute of Higher Education
  - Centennial College
  - Chu Hai College of Higher Education
  - Hang Seng Management College
  - Hong Kong Nang Yan College of Higher Education
  - Hong Kong Shue Yan University
  - Tung Wah College
  - UOW College Hong Kong
2. the Open University of Hong Kong, which is a statutory institution operating on a self-financing basis; the Technological and Higher Education Institute of Hong Kong, Vocational Training Council.

=== Operators of self-financing locally accredited post-secondary programmes and non-local programmes ===
1. Locally accredited post-secondary programmes, including:
  - Hong Kong College of Technology
  - Hong Kong Institute of Technology and Savannah College of Art and Design
2. 1200 non-local courses registered or exempted under the Non-local High and Professional Education (Regulation) Ordinance (Cap.493)

== Key government policies ==
=== Financial Support ===
Over the years, the Government has provided a series of financial schemes to support self-financing higher education institutions, including:

Start-up Loan Scheme (2001)

- Interest-free loans provided to self-financing higher education institutions for the construction of new premises or renovation/extension of existing premises.

Self-financing Higher Education Fund (2011)

- A $2.5 billion fund is established for awarding scholarships to outstanding students who study full-time in locally accredited self-financing programmes.

Quality Enhancement Grant Scheme (2012)

- A scheme aiming to support initiatives or projects which promote better teaching and learning experience of self-financing programmes.

Research Endowment Fund (2012)

- A $3 billion fund established to support academic enhancement and research development for a total of eleven institutions which provide locally accredited self-financing degree programmes.

Student Financial Assistance Schemes

- The Student Finance Office provides both means-tested and non-means-tested financial assistance schemes for students attending self-financing programmes. These schemes include Financial Assistance Scheme for Post-secondary Students (FASP) (for full-time students, means-tested) and Non-means-tested Loan Scheme for Post-secondary Students (NLSPS).

Study Subsidy Scheme for Designated Professions/Sectors (SSSDP)

- The scheme was first launched in the 2015/16 academic year. It subsidized around 1000 students per cohort to pursue designated full-time locally accredited self-financing undergraduate programmes in selected disciplines. The scheme will increase the number of subsidized places to around 3000 students per cohort in the 2018/19 academic year.

=== Quality Assurance ===
Currently in Hong Kong, three bodies are responsible for quality assurance of programmes offered by higher education institutions. In order to receive local accreditation, the programme has to satisfy the standards of the Hong Kong Qualifications Framework (QF) to ensure credibility and recognition.

1. Hong Kong Council for Accreditation of Academic and Vocational Qualifications (HKCAAVQ): It is responsible for accreditation and qualification registration of programmes offered by all non-UGC-funded institutions. It monitors the compliance of both the operation (e.g. governance structure, financial condition, etc.) and programme quality (e.g. quality of teaching and learning, academic standard, etc.) with the requirements stipulated in the Hong Kong Qualification Framework.
2. Quality Assurance Council (QAC): QAC was established in 2007 under the University Grants Committee (UGC). The main responsibility of QAC is to conduct quality audits of all programmes, both Government-funded and self-financed programmes included, offered by UGC-funded institutions.
3. Joint Quality Review Committee (JQRC): JQRC was established in 2005 by the Heads of Universities Committee. It is responsible for providing peer review on the quality assurance processes of self-financing sub-degree programmes offered by UGC-funded institutions. The objective is to ensure quality assurance assessments achieve the requirements of the Hong Kong Qualification Framework.

=== Recognition of Associate Degrees ===
The qualification of associate degree is recognized by around 26 professional bodies in Hong Kong, such as information technology, logistics, financial services, etc. For recruitment in the civil service, the Civil Service Bureau started accepting locally accredited associate degree qualifications (as broadly equivalent to Higher Diploma qualifications) since 2001. There are more than 70 grades that accept applications from associate degree holders (who hold associate degree as one's highest qualification), including 13 grades that require higher diploma qualifications or below, and other grades that require qualifications below sub-degree level.

=== Non-means-tested Subsidy Scheme for Self-financing Undergraduate Studies ===
Under Carrie Lam's administration, the government introduced a non-means-tested annual subsidy for eligible students pursuing full-time locally accredited self-financing undergraduate programmes in Hong Kong. The subsidy scheme provides a $30,000 subsidy to Hong Kong students who have either attained (a) “3322” in Hong Kong Diploma for Secondary Education Examination (HKDSE) or (b) sub-degree qualifications at the time when they are enrolled in the selected self-financing undergraduate degree programs.

However, the scheme does not cover UGC-funded degree and sub-degree programs, self-financing degree programs at UGC-funded universities and sub-degree programs, including associate degrees and higher diplomas, offered by private universities and colleges. According to Kevin Yeung Yun-hung, Deputy Education Chief, sub-degree programs are not covered in the subsidy scheme as the government has to evaluate their value and orientation in the market.

The introduction of the subsidy scheme had led to the reduction of the tuition fees level in private universities and colleges. Prior to the subsidy scheme, most of the self-financing degree programs charged students HKD $60,000 - $130,000 a year. Under the new subsidy scheme, the tuition fees for most self-financing degree programs drop to HKD$24,000 - $99,030. Some institutions even have a tuition fee level lower than the one at publicly funded universities. Students reading eligible private college degree programs will therefore benefit directly from reduced tuition fees and financial burden.

Self-financing institutions	Pre-subsidy tuition fees	Post-subsidy tuition fees
Centennial College	$89,000	$59,000
Heng Seng Management College	$77,400	$47,400
Open University of Hong Kong	$71,360 - $115,920	$41,360 - $85,920
Tung Wah College	$54,000 - $129,030	$24,000 - $99,030
Chu Hai College of Higher Education	$69,000	$39,000
Gratia Christian College	$63,000	$33,000
UOW College Hong Kong	$69,000	$39,000

The economic incentive may encourage more students to apply for self-financing higher degree offered by the selected private universities and colleges. After the release of HKDSE result, some candidates expressed their interests in applying to self-financing degree program instead of the self-financing associate degree programs, mainly because of the lower tuitions fees of the former under the new subsidy scheme. However, Kevin Yeung Yun-hung revealed in mid-November 2017 that there was no major shift in the proportion of students between self-financing degree and sub-degree programs. Ng Po-shing, Director of the Student Guidance Centre of Hok Yau Club, explained that most of the self-financing degree programs offered by the selected private universities and colleges have a relatively low recognition in the society and in the job market, and that students would prefer reading a sub-degree to seek admission to public universities. This is particularly the case when students reading sub-degree programs can apply for the subsidized self-financing degree programs even if they cannot be admitted to public universities after graduation. Therefore, Ng predicted that the $30,000 subsidy has little influence on students’ decision in choosing between self-financing degree and sub-degree programmes.

== Challenges ==
=== Declining number of secondary school graduates ===
With the reduction of school-age population, a persistent decline in the number of local secondary school graduates is projected in the next few years. The number will continuously decrease from 71,700 in 2014 to 45,100 in 2022, and is anticipated to climb to 69,900 in 2030. It is projected that starting from 2017, the number of post-secondary intake places will be more than the number of eligible candidates. There will be insufficient number of prospective student among self-financing higher educational institutions, resulting in the low demand for post-secondary education.

Meanwhile, the supply of both publicly funded and self-financing post-secondary education programs are anticipated to increase in the coming years. The surplus of post-secondary education programmes suggests a more fierce competition for eligible candidates within the expanding self-financing higher education sector. In 2016, the Education Bureau found that 82% of the self-financing higher education programs had the actual intake of students lower than their expected number. For example, Chu Hai College of Higher Education expected to recruit 1030 students in the first year of admission, but only 169 were eventually accepted. Similarly, Centennial College provided 440 intake places while only 75 students were admitted at the end.

Since the funding of self-financing higher education institutions depends upon their tuition fee income, the intensified competition will drive some private universities and colleges into financial difficulties. In 2016, it was revealed that Centennial College faced serious financial difficulties such that it was taken over by and currently managed by HKU School of Professional and Continuing Education (HKU SPACE). Before the figure of secondary school population climbs up again, it is expected that self-financing post-secondary institutions will face grave problems in terms of admission and finance.

Members from the education sector criticised the government for failing to foresee the future decline of secondary population, and wrongly encouraged the private sector to expand the self-financing post-secondary sector.

=== Financial constraints ===
Different financial schemes (such as Self-financing Higher Education Fund and Quality Enhancement Grant Scheme) have been implemented to support the development of self-financing higher education institutions. However, no recurrent funds are provided for daily operation of facilities, salaries of teaching and non-teaching staff, and extra-curricular activities for students. Compared to UGC-funded universities, which receive Government's subsidy of $242,260 per student every year since the 2015/16 academic year, the major income source of self-financing institutions comes from tuition fees, which is around $60,000-$85,000 per student every year, but this cannot cover their operational expenses. Despite the financial difficulties, they are also reluctant to have significant increase in their tuition fees due to the concern of negative publicity. The lack of alumni network and reputation also aggravates the difficulty for the institutions to obtain donations from society.

=== Ineffective peer review mechanism ===
The 2012 ‘CCLU’ incident aroused public concern towards the quality of teaching and learning offered by self-financing higher education institutions.

First, there was the problem of excess admission of students. The original number of placements for all programmes in the 2012/13 academic year was 1900 students, but over 5400 students were being admitted in total. Owing to insufficient classroom facilities, lessons were cut from three hours to two hours in order to accommodate all registered students. In addition, the tutor-student ratio exceeded the Education Bureau's requirement. The maximum capacity for language courses was 25 students, but the class size at most reached 40 students. Given the limited resources regarding classroom facilities and qualified tutors, it would be difficult for the institution to maintain the quality of teaching and learning.

Second, unregistered courses were being offered. In the ‘CCLU’ incident, it was discovered that CCLU offered 25 unregistered courses which were not listed on the Information Portal for Accredited Post-secondary Programmes (IPASS), a website launched by the Government in 2007 to provide information on programmes and courses offered by higher education institutions.

The ‘CCLU’ incident revealed the ineffectiveness of JQRC's peer review mechanism. There was a lack of transparency on the manner in which peer reviews on quality assurance processes were being conducted. Impartiality of the mechanism was also doubted owing to the absence of an independent third party in the review process.

=== Insufficient recognition ===
In promoting self-financing higher education institutions, the government emphasizes the broad coverage of both general and professional education offered by these institutions, together with the recognition of higher diploma and associate degree qualifications by various professional bodies. However, the problem of insufficient recognition remains due to the inconsistency between curriculum design and the skills required for human resources in Hong Kong. The learning outcome of these programmes do not match with current demands of techniques and soft skills in the labour market, which has adversely affected the employability of graduates and the recognition of the institution. One of the reasons is that there is inadequate communication and collaboration between institutions and the industry, leading to weak alignments in curriculum design and actual skills needed in the real world.

The socio-economic prospect of graduates, especially associate degree graduates, reflects the recognition issue of self-financing higher education institutions from another perspective. Although associate degree is an independently recognized qualification, it is commonly perceived as stepping stones to bachelor's degree programmes. For those aged 30–34 earning a monthly salary over $30,000, 42.3% have a bachelor's degree, while only 6.3% obtain associate degree as one's highest qualification. Moreover, reports showed that 63.7% associate degree holders aged 20–34 earn an income lower than the overall median income in Hong Kong, with a significant discrepancy with bachelor's degree holders.

The recognition of self-financing higher education institutions is also affected by Government's accreditation. Under the Post-Secondary Colleges Ordinance (Cap. 320), the accreditation process is conducted by Hong Kong Council for Accreditation of Academic and Vocational Qualifications (HKCAAVQ). The process is criticised for its expensive cost and the duration that it takes for self-financing institutions to be upgraded to private universities, which involves two rounds and usually takes an institution ten years for the upgrading process.

== Recommendations ==
=== Reform of Quality Assurance Mechanism ===
In pursuance of coherence and consistency in quality assurance practice, the University Grants Committee proposed in 2010 the integration of HKCAAVQ, Joint Quality Review Committee and the Quality Assurance Council.

The rationale lies in the fragmented division of responsibilities among the three quality assurance bodies, with different bodies regulating certain parts of the oversight system. Considering the quality-assurance agencies for sub-degree programmes, programmes offered by UGC-funded are monitored by the Joint Quality Review Committee, while others are quality-assured by the Hong Kong Council for Accreditation of Academic and Vocational Qualifications.

From the student's viewpoint, it is difficult to compare the quality of self-financing sub-degree programme provided by a UGC-funded institution and a private institution, as they are quality-regulated by two different bodies. For education providers, the fragmented oversight mechanism casts doubt upon the consistencies in the quality assurance practices applied to different institutions. The differences in regulatory frameworks, for example, allow UGC-funded institutions to offer new programmes in a faster manner as compared to other institutions, which have to go through the HKCAAVQ process.

=== Institutional Governance ===
With reference to overseas examples, the Committee on Self-financing post-secondary Education translated the principles into concrete recommendation for governance practices.

Firstly, it proposes the development of strategic and operational plans that are aligned with the missions and visions of the institutions. The abstract plan should be translated into detailed analysis of the institution's strengths and weaknesses, and assessment of the risk and opportunities in the external environment.

Also, the institutions should publish annual reports that reviews their performance against the published strategic and operational plans. Financial information should be made available to current students and the general public.

In respect of the governing structures, the governing body should include different stakeholders and a mix of expertise. An institution should establish a system of appointment of members to its governing body and key committees, which enhances the transparency and accountability of its governance.

=== Code of Practice ===
To standardize the benchmark of these institutions, the Steering Committee on the Review of Post-secondary Education Sector proposes the introduction of a code of practice that broadly outlines the arrangements for good governance and quality assurance. The code assures student, employers and the public that the governance and quality assurance of self-financing post-secondary education institutions will stay within the stipulated ambit of the code.

The committee suggests that the code should be based on principles of good governance and quality assurance derived from academic studies and overseas examples, which include:

1. Participation and accountability: (Appointment of external member to the governing body; Training programme for governing body; accountability mechanism)
2. Inclusiveness: (Diverse composition of governing body and relevant committees; Involvement of different stakeholders in the QA processes)
3. Performance-based: (Compilation of performance indicators)
4. Transparency (public accessibility to key information)

As the principles and processes of governance and QA are closely related, it gives credence to the proposal of introducing one single code covering both governance and QA.

=== Curriculum ===
The convenor of Education and Training Sub-committee of Banking Industry Training Advisory Committee criticised the weak alignments and communications between educational institutions and industries. Currently, the curriculum focuses on generic banking and finance knowledge, which has to be adjusted to reflect the real world and puts more emphasis on technical and soft skills. There were rarely dialogues between institutions and the industry on knowledge, skills and attributes that banks require.

In 2013, the Education Bureau urges self-financing higher education institutions to conduct in-depth research on the current needs of society, and engage employers and professional bodies to participate in the curriculum design.

In view of the rise of economic power in Asia, the University Grants Committee highlights the need of incorporating the Asian context in building the new curricula. The additional focus would provide a distinctive character to part of Hong Kong higher education and enhance the learning horizons of local and non-local students alike.

=== Extension of the Subsidy Scheme ===
Some criticise that the scheme covers only self-financing degree programs offered by private universities and colleges, excluding those offered by UGC-funded universities. A number of students reading self-financing degree programmes in public universities complained that the scheme is unfair to them, since they have to pay even higher level of tuition fees than their counterparts in private universities.

Isabella Ng Fung-sheung, Assistant Professor at Education University, considered that the government deliberately drew a demarcation between self-financing degree programs offered by public universities and those offered by private universities. She argued that the subsidy scheme was introduced to assist those “weak” private universities to survive amidst the declining number of secondary 6 population, and therefore the relatively “strong” UGC-operated self-financing degree programs with sufficient intake of students are not covered under the scheme. Such a distinction would impede benign competition in self-financing higher education market, therefore failing to weed out those substandard degree programs offered by private post-secondary institutions. President of the Hong Kong Professional Teachers’ Union, Dr. Fung Wai-wah, also criticized the demarcation deprives students of the choice to choose between quality self-financing degree programs offered by public universities and those substandard programs offered by private colleges.

Political commentator, Albert Cheng opts for the proposal of extending the subsidy scheme to programmes offered by UGC-funded institutions. By providing economic incentives to students applying for self-financing degree programs offered by private universities, Cheng worried that those better-quality UGC-funded degree programs will be marginalized after the introduction of the subsidy scheme. He considered that it is “ridiculous” to expend valuable public resources to fund substandard programs at private universities and compel students to accept poor-quality education. Such substandard programs, as he argued, shall not receive any subsidization so that they can be weeded out in the market to raise the overall quality of the degree programs in self-financing higher education market.

Nevertheless, Ng Po-shing submitted that Cheng's worry may be exaggerated, since the new $30,000 subsidy scheme does not appear to affect students’ decision in the 2017/2018 intake, and most students opt to either read a UGC-funded degree program, or a sub-degree program, which provides less capable performers in HKDSE with an alternative route to public universities.
