= Paul Morris (educationalist) =

President of the Hong Kong Institute of Education
- In office 2002–2007
- Preceded by: Ruth Hayhoe
- Succeeded by: Lee Wing-on

Personal details
- Born: 1951 (age 74–75)
- Education: University of Leeds (BEd); Council for National Academic Awards (MSc); University of Sussex (DPhil)

Paul Morris (born 1951) is an internationally renowned educational scholar – best known for his analysis of education policy in Hong Kong and East Asia. He was President of the Hong Kong Institute of Education (HKIEd; now the Education University of Hong Kong) until July 2007.

== Career ==
Morris obtained his BEd (Economics) from the University of Leeds, MSc (Sociology of Education) from the Council for National Academic Awards (CNAA) and DPhil from the University of Sussex. He taught at the University of Hong Kong from 1976, was Dean of the Faculty of Education there from 1986 until 1992, and became Chair Professor in Curriculum Studies in 1997. He served on the Government Education Commission from 1988 to 1993. He was Deputy Director (Academic) at the HKIEd from August 2000, and in 2002 became the President. In recognition of his services to education he was presented with the degree of Doctor of Civil Law (honoris causa) by the University of East Anglia in 2007. In October 2007 he was appointed as a Professor of Comparative Education at the Institute of Education, University College London.

== Controversy ==
Morris campaigned to establish the Institute as a university in its own right after it attained self-accrediting status under his leadership in March 2004. In November 2006 the Secretary for Education and Manpower, Arthur Li, indicated that Shue Yan College would be made a university title, but that HKIEd would not.

Subsequently, on 25 January 2007, the governing Council of the Institute decided not to extend Morris's tenure as President after the end of his contract, in a vote of 10 to 3 with 3 abstentions. Morris maintained he had been told by the Chairman of the Council, Thomas Leung Kwok-fai, that his tenure would be terminated unless he agreed to the merger of the Institute with the Chinese University of Hong Kong (CUHK). The Chairman denied Morris' assertion, stressing that Morris had misinterpreted him and that there was no connection between the two. This gave rise to speculation that Arthur Li was trying to force the amalgamation.

On 2 February 2007, 10 external HKIEd Council members held a conference with editors of press to explain their reasons for not reappointing Morris as President. Following the media reports next day, HKIEd Vice President Professor Bernard Luk Hung-kay posted an Intranet letter in response in which he alleged that Morris had been under pressure to merge HKIEd with CUHK and to sack staff who were critical of government policies.

On 15 February 2007 Chief Executive Donald Tsang appointed a Commission of Inquiry to "…establish the facts relevant to those allegations made by the Institute’s Academic Vice President…" and further said that "The Commission will ascertain if there has indeed been any improper interference with the Institute’s academic freedom or institutional autonomy."

The Commission started hearings on 6 March 2007 and issued its report on 20 June 2007 . It concluded, with regard to the specific allegations, that "it was improper for someone of Mrs (Fanny) Law's position (then Permanent Secretary for Education and Manpower), to attempt to silence critics by addressing them personally or through their superiors." [Para 11.48] Also, "it was unacceptable that she did not express her opinions openly and through proper channels, but instead in a manner with the semblance, if not also the substance, of intimidation and reprisal. The Commission disapproves such behaviour unequivocally" [Para 14:25] and "even if well-intentioned (her complaints) were improper and constituted an improper interference with Mr Ip's and Prof. Cheng's academic freedom."

It found that two other allegations, which arose during the course of the Inquiry but were denied by the senior government officials involved, did in fact occur. Firstly, Arthur Li had threatened to ‘rape’ the HKIEd if it failed to merge with CUHK; and secondly, Fanny Law had requested a professor at HKIEd to sack a staff member who was publicly critical of the Government’s reform agenda. The credibility of Arthur Li [Para 8.77] and Fanny Law [para 8.84] as witnesses was questioned by the Commission, whereas Professor Morris was described as a “generally honest” [Para 8.45] and “truthful” [Para 9.31] witness.

On the day the report was published Fanny Law resigned from her post as Commissioner of the Independent Commission Against Corruption (ICAC). Arthur Li was not reappointed to the new Government that came into office on 1 July 2007.

However, in 2007, the Secretary for Education took out a judicial review to challenge one statement made in the Commission's report, viz. that a government minister should not directly approach academics. The court of first instance held that on this matter the Permanent Secretary's approach did not violate the Institute's right to academic freedom, and the judicial review was allowed in March 2009. This did not affect the findings of the Commission with regard to their terms of reference. For a fuller analysis of the controversy see: Morris, Paul (2010). "Academic freedom, university governance and the state: the Commission of Inquiry into the Hong Kong Institute of Education". Journal of Education Policy. 25 (5): 587–603. doi:10.1080/02680931003671962. S2CID 143446877.

Currently, Professor Morris works at the Institute of Education, University College London.
