= Academic grading in Hong Kong =

Academic work in Hong Kong is graded as follows:

== Universities ==
In Hong Kong, the system of grade point average (GPA) is used in universities.

A+	4.30	B+	3.30	C+	2.30	D+	1.30
A	4.00	B	3.00	C	2.00	D	1.00	F	0.00
A-	3.70	B-	2.70	C-	1.70

Some universities do not include A+ in the grades, or set the grade point of A+ to be 4.00, so that the maximum GPA attainable is 4.00 instead of 4.30. Some universities use a 12-point based system called "CGA" instead. Some universities do not include minus grades (i.e., no A−, B−, C−) and the grade point of A+, B+, C+, D+ is 4.5, 3.5, 2.5, 1.5 respectively.

=== Definitions ===
- Grade A: Excellent
- Grade B: Good
- Grade C: Adequate
- Grade D: Marginal pass
- Grade E: Conditional fail (rare)
- Grade F: Fail

== Hong Kong Certificate of Education Examination and Hong Kong Advanced Level Examination ==
Results of the Hong Kong Certificate of Education Examination (HKCEE) and Hong Kong Advanced Level Examination (HKALE) were expressed in terms of six grades A to F, of which grade A is the highest and F the lowest. Results below grade F were designated as unclassified (UNCL). HKCEE and HKALE have been completely replaced by the Hong Kong Diploma of Secondary Education Examination in 2013. The last HKCEE were held in 2012 and the last HKALE were held in 2013 for private candidates only.

=== Common Grade Definition of HKCEE and HKALE Recognized by the Government and Institutes ===
- Grade A: Distinction or GCSE/GCE A* equivalent
- Grade B: Credit or GCSE/GCE A*/A equivalent
- Grade C: Credit or GCSE/GCE A equivalent
- Grade D: Pass or GCSE/GCE B equivalent
- Grade E: Pass or GCSE/GCE C equivalent
- Grade F: Failed
- UNCL: Unclassified

Notes:

- Grade C or above in a HKCEE subject is recognised as equivalent to an O-level pass (grade C or better) in an overseas GCE examination. But Grade E in HKCEE is commonly recognized as a pass for most employers and education institutes in Hong Kong.
- Grade E or above in HKALE subject is recognised as equivalent to a pass (Grade E or above) in a British overseas GCE examination.
- Historically the Hong Kong A level (HKALE) grade C has been aligned by NARIC to GCE grade A. This decision seems to have been based upon the portion of candidates passing the HKALE at different grades – just under 25% achieved a grade C or higher in Hong Kong A levels overall in 2008. This compares to just under 26% achieving a GCE grade A in 2008. In setting standards for the HKDSE, levels 4 and 5 (including 5, 5*, 5**) will be set with reference to the standards achieved by students awarded grades A-D in the current HKALE.

== Hong Kong Diploma of Secondary Education Examination ==
For Category A subjects (Senior Secondary Subjects) in the HKDSE, results are expressed in terms of five levels, of which level 5 is the highest and level 1 the lowest. Distinction levels 5** and 5* will be awarded to two best-performing groups of candidates attaining Level 5, with level 5** being awarded to the highest-achieving 10% and level 5* being awarded to the next highest-achieving 30%.

For Category B subjects (Applied Learning Subjects), results awarded are divided into three grades, "Attained", "Attained with Distinction (I)" and "Attained with Distinction (II)". The grade "Attained with Distinction (I)" is comparable to a level 3 of the Category A subjects while "Attained with Distinction (II)" is comparable to level 4 or above. The subject of Applied Learning Chinese however only has the grades "Attained" and "Attained with Distinction", which the grade "Attained with Distinction" is comparable to level 3 or above of the Category A subjects. Performance below the grade "Attained" is designated as "Unattained" and will not be reflected on the certificate.

=== Generally Recognised Grade Equivalence of HKDSE to HKALE and UK A-levels ===
Historically the Hong Kong A level (HKALE) grade C has been aligned by NARIC to GCE grade A. This decision seems to have been based upon the portion of candidates passing the HKALE at different grades – just under 25% achieved a grade C or higher in Hong Kong A levels overall in 2008. This compares to just under 26% achieving a GCE grade A in 2008. In setting standards for the HKDSE, levels 4 and 5 (including 5, 5*, 5**) will be set with reference to the standards achieved by students awarded grades A-D in the current HKALE.

HKALE	GCE A-Level	HKDSE
A	A*	5**
B	A/A*	5*
C	A	5
D/E	B/C	4
E/F	D/E	3
F/U	F	1-2
Note: The HKEAA does not make a direct comparison between HKALE and HKDSE grades.
