= List of higher education institutions in Hong Kong =

Under Hong Kong law, there are 22 accredited degree-awarding higher education institutions in Hong Kong. Only the first three categories of higher education are eligible to award bachelor's degrees or above in Hong Kong.

== Universities ==
Name	Area	Type	Year established	Year granted university status
The University of Hong Kong 香港大學	Hong Kong Island	UGC-funded	1887 - Hong Kong College of Medicine for Chinese; 1911 - The University of Hong Kong (college merged in)	1911
The Chinese University of Hong Kong 香港中文大學	New Territories	UGC-funded	1963 - Merged from Chung Chi College, New Asia College, and United College	1963
The Hong Kong University of Science and Technology 香港科技大學	New Territories (Official Address: Kowloon)	UGC-funded	1991 - The Hong Kong University of Science and Technology	1988 (Note: The Hong Kong University of Science and Technology Ordinance officially came into effect on 10 April 1988. This legally incorporated the university, appointed its first President (Prof. Chia-Wei Woo), and allowed the campus groundbreaking to begin. However, the university officially opened and welcomed its very first cohort of students in 1991. This is why HKUST traditionally celebrates 1991 as its formal founding year.)
The Hong Kong Polytechnic University 香港理工大學	Kowloon	UGC-funded	1937 - The Government Trade School; 1972 - The Hong Kong Polytechnic	1994
City University of Hong Kong 香港城市大學	Kowloon	UGC-funded	1984 - City Polytechnic of Hong Kong	1994
Hong Kong Baptist University 香港浸會大學	Kowloon	UGC-funded	1956 - Hong Kong Baptist College	1994
Hong Kong Metropolitan University 香港都會大學 (Note: The Open University of Hong Kong was established and financed by the Hong Kong Government from 1989 to 1993. Since then, it has been self-financed but still receives some irregular subsidies and loans from the government.)	Kowloon	Self-financed	1989 - The Open Learning Institute of Hong Kong; 1997 - The Open University of Hong Kong; 2021 - Hong Kong Metropolitan University	1997
Lingnan University 嶺南大學	New Territories	UGC-funded	1888 - Christian College in Guangzhou; 1903 - Canton Christian College; 1927 - Lingnan University; 1967 - Lingnan College, re-established in Hong Kong; 1978 - registered as an Approved Post Secondary College	1999
Hong Kong Shue Yan University 香港樹仁大學 (Note: In January 2007, the Hong Kong government offered a one-off grant of HK$200 million to establish a general development fund to support the academic development and improve the campus facilities of Hong Kong Shue Yan University.)	Hong Kong Island	Self-financed	1971 - Hong Kong Shue Yan College; 1976 - registered as an Approved Post Secondary College; 2006 - Hong Kong Shue Yan University	2006
The Education University of Hong Kong 香港教育大學	New Territories	UGC-funded	1994 - Merged from Northcote College of Education, Grantham College of Education, Sir Robert Black College of Education, Hong Kong Technical Teachers' College and Institute of Language in Education to form The Hong Kong Institute of Education (HKIEd); 2016 - Education University of Hong Kong	2016
The Hang Seng University of Hong Kong 香港恒生大學	New Territories	Self-financed	2010 - Hang Seng Management College; 2018 - The Hang Seng University of Hong Kong	2018
Saint Francis University 聖方濟各大學 (Note: In August 2017, the Hong Kong government announced 6 self-funded institutions, Caritas Institute of Higher Education, Chu Hai College of Higher Education, Hang Seng Management College, The Open University of Hong Kong, Tung Wah College and Technological and Higher Education Institute of Hong Kong will be included in the Study Subsidy Scheme for Designated Professions/Sectors (SSSDP) from 2018.)	New Territories	Self-financed	1985 - Established as Caritas Francis Hsu College (明愛徐誠斌書院); 2001 - registered as an Approved Post Secondary College; 2011 - The new Chinese name "明愛徐誠斌學院" was adopted. Then, the college changed its name to the "Caritas Institute of Higher Education" (明愛專上學院) the same year.	2024

The following notation is used:

- UGC-funded universities: universities funded by public and under the University Grants Committee
- Self-financed institutions: higher education institutions that are self-funded

== Post-secondary Institutions ==
Name	Area	Type	Year established
Centennial College 明德學院	Hong Kong Island	Private	2011
Chu Hai College of Higher Education 珠海學院	New Territories	Private	1947 - Chu Hai University in Guangzhou; 1949 - Chu Hai College, re-established in Hong Kong; 2004 - Chu Hai College of Higher Education; 2004 - registered as an Approved Post Secondary College
Gratia Christian College 宏恩基督教學院		Private	2015
HKCT Institute of Higher Education 港專學院	Kowloon	Private	2014
Hong Kong Nang Yan College of Higher Education 香港能仁專上學院	Kowloon	Private	1969 - Hong Kong Buddhist College; 2014 - Hong Kong Nang Yan College of Higher Education; 2014 - registered as an Approved Post Secondary College
Technological and Higher Education Institute of Hong Kong 香港高等科技教育學院	Hong Kong Island	Public	2012
Tung Wah College 東華學院	Kowloon	Private	2010 - Tung Wah Tertiary Institute; 2011 - Tung Wah College; 2011 - registered as an Approved Post Secondary College
UOW College Hong Kong 香港伍倫貢學院	New Territories	Private	2004 - Community College of City University, under the City University of Hong Kong; 2019 - UOW College Hong Kong
Yew Chung College of Early Childhood Education 耀中幼教學院		Private	2018

In July 2017, the Hong Kong government announced that the non-means-tested Subsidy Scheme for Self-financing Undergraduate Studies in Hong Kong will include full-time self-financing degree programmes from 15 (non-UGC funded) institutions for the cohort to be admitted in the 2017/18 academic year.

== Public institutions ==
These institutions are government-supported, but do not fall under the UGC.

Name	Year established
The Hong Kong Academy for Performing Arts 香港演藝學院	1984
Hong Kong Institute of Vocational Education 香港專業教育學院	1999 - By merger of 9 technical institutes

== Sub-degree institutions ==
These institutions offer higher education programmes, but are not authorised to confer degrees.

Name	Parent institution	Year established
School of Continuing and Professional Education	City University of Hong Kong	1991
Caritas Bianchi College of Careers	Caritas Hong Kong	1971
Hong Kong Art School	Hong Kong Arts Centre	2000
HKBU College of International Education	Hong Kong Baptist University	2000
HKBU School of Continuing Education	Hong Kong Baptist University	1975
Hong Kong College of Technology		1957
Hong Kong Institute of Technology		1997
HKU SPACE Po Leung Kuk Community College	University of Hong Kong	2006
Lingnan Institute of Further Education	Lingnan University	2001
CUHK School of Continuing and Professional Studies	The Chinese University of Hong Kong	1957
Hong Kong Community College	Hong Kong Polytechnic University	2001
HKU SPACE Community College	University of Hong Kong	2000
Li Ka Shing Institute of Professional and Continuing Education	Hong Kong Metropolitan University	1992
Hong Kong Management Association (香港管理專業協會)		1960
YMCA College Of Careers	Chinese YMCA of Hong Kong	1995
Academy of the Baptist Convention of Hong Kong	Baptist Convention of Hong Kong	2000

== Other institutions ==
- Savannah College of Art and Design of Hong Kong was a campus of a US-based university in North Kowloon Magistracy. The school was shut down in 2020.
- University of Chicago Hong Kong, a satellite campus of the University of Chicago in Hong Kong

== See also ==
Hong Kong

- List of Hong Kong university vice-chancellors and presidents
- Education in Hong Kong
- Higher education in Hong Kong
- Hong Kong Council for Accreditation of Academic and Vocational Qualifications
- List of schools in Hong Kong
- List of mainland Chinese schools reopened in Hong Kong
- List of buildings and structures in Hong Kong

Other lists of universities

- List of universities and colleges in Macau
- List of colleges and universities by country
- List of colleges and universities
