= Education University of Hong Kong =

Public university in New Territories, Hong Kong

Coordinates: 22.4689°N 114.194°E

- 香港教育大學
- Seal of the university
- Type: Public
- Established: 1994; 32 years ago
- Affiliations: BHUA, GHMUA
- Chairman: David Wong Yau-kar
- Chancellor: John Lee Ka-chiu
- President: Lee Chi-kin John
- Vice-president: Vacant (Academic); Chan Che-hin Chetwyn (Research and Development); Wong Man-yee Sarah (Administration)
- Academic staff: 427 (2023)
- Administrative staff: 953 (2023)
- Students: 8,827 (2023)
- Undergraduates: 5,815 (2023)
- Postgraduates: 786 (2023)
- Location: 10 Lo Ping Road, Tai Po, New Territories, Hong Kong
- Campus: Suburban
- Colours: Orange & green
- Website: eduhk.hk

Chinese name
- Traditional Chinese: 香港教育大學
- Simplified Chinese: 香港教育大学
- Cantonese Yale: Hēunggóng Gaauyuhk Daaihhohk
Transcriptions
Standard Mandarin
- Hanyu Pinyin: Xiānggǎng Jiàoyù Dàxué
Yue: Cantonese
- Yale Romanization: Hēunggóng Gaauyuhk Daaihhohk
- Jyutping: Hoeng1gong2 Gaau3juk6 Daai6hok6

The Hong Kong Institute of Education
- Traditional Chinese: 香港教育學院
- Simplified Chinese: 香港教育学院
- Cantonese Yale: Hēung góng gāau yuhk hohk yuhn
Transcriptions
Yue: Cantonese
- Yale Romanization: Hēung góng gāau yuhk hohk yuhn
- Jyutping: Hoeng1 gong2 gaau1 juk6 hok6 jyun6

Logo of HKIEd (1994–2016)

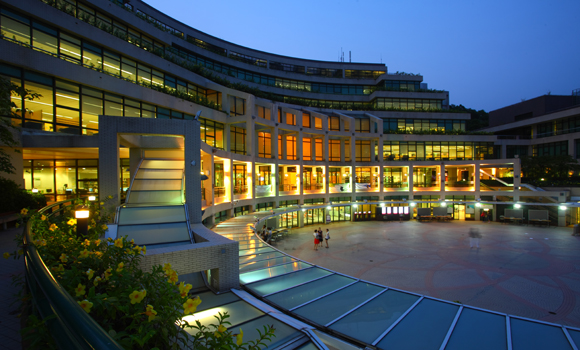
EdUHK Campus View

The Education University of Hong Kong (EdUHK) is a public university in Ting Kok, New Territories, Hong Kong.

The university was founded in 1994 as The Hong Kong Institute of Education. It is one of eight subsidised universities under the University Grants Committee of Hong Kong and the only one historically dedicated to teacher education, with an increasingly broadening academic scope across recent years.

== History and recent developments ==
The history of The Education University of Hong Kong (EdUHK) can be traced back to 1853. The St. Paul's College introduced the first formalised programme of in-service teacher training. This was described in its Annual Report for 1994–1995. On 25 April 1994, under the recommendation made by the Education Commission Report No 5, The Hong Kong Institute of Education (HKIEd) was formally established by the merger of:

- Northcote College of Education, established in 1939 and named after Sir Geoffry Northcote, then Governor of Hong Kong.
  - The college was at what is now at the Bonham Road Government Primary School in Sai Ying Pun from 1941 to 1962, though this was interrupted by the Japanese occupation of Hong Kong. In 1962, the college moved to 21 Sassoon Road, now headquarters of the Li Ka Shing Medical Faculty of the HKU. The college returned to the Sai Ying Pun site in 1971 and stayed there until 1997.
- Grantham College of Education, established in 1951 and named after Sir Alexander Grantham, then Governor of Hong Kong. It was located at 42 Gascoigne Road.
- Sir Robert Black College of Education, established in 1960 and named after Sir Robert Brown Black, then Governor of Hong Kong.
- Hong Kong Technical Teachers’ College, established in 1974.
- Institute of Language in Education, established in 1982 and previously under the supervision of the then Education Department.

Established in 1994, HKIEd provides doctorate, master and undergraduate degrees, postgraduate diploma, certificates and a range of in-service programmes to around 7,000 pre-service students and serving teachers.

In October 1997, the Institute moved to its new campus in Tai Po near the Tai Po Industrial Estate. It has a Sports Centre at Pak Shek Kok, Tai Po, as well as a Town Centre campus in Tseung Kwan O.

In 2001, the HKIEd HSBC Early Childhood Learning Centre was established on the campus. The HKIEd Jockey Club Primary School was founded on the campus in the following year.

From 1 May 2004, the institute was granted self-accrediting status in respect of its own teacher education programmes at degree-level and above.

In June 2009, the institute won extra annual funding of HK$22 million from the Hong Kong Government to provide 120 undergraduate degree places for three new undergraduate programs and 30 research postgraduate places for the 2009–2012 triennium.

In January 2010, the University Grants Committee endorsed the HKIEd's plans for Research Postgraduate programmes and undergraduate programs in three disciplines: "Humanities" (mainly Language), "Social Sciences", and "Creative Arts & Culture".

The approval is seen as a step closer for the institute to gaining its university title by becoming a fully-fledged university of education with a range of disciplines and strong research capacity.

HKIEd will launch its first batch of non-education programmes, namely the Bachelor of Arts in Language Studies and Bachelor of Social Sciences in Global and Environmental Studies in September 2010. Both programmes have already secured the support of the External Validation Panel of the Hong Kong Council for Accreditation of Academic and Vocational Qualifications.

Preparations for the launching of the third Education-Plus programme, Bachelor of Arts in Creative Arts and Culture, in 2011–2012 are underway.

The institute operates four institute-level research centres had been set up to facilitate the growth of expertise in multi-disciplinary research.

On 11 September 2015 the University Grants Committee accepted the application by the Institute of Education to change its name to university, and on 26 January 2016 the adoption of the title "The Education University of Hong Kong" was approved. Accordingly, The Hong Kong Institute of Education (Amendment) Bill will be gazetted on 19 February 2016 and introduced into the Legislative Council on 2 March 2016.

In January 2016, the institute was awarded self-accrediting status in three further programme areas, covered by its existing Programme Area Accreditation status: Chinese Studies, English Studies and Environmental Studies.

On 27 May 2016, the institute was formally renamed The Education University of Hong Kong in recognition of its "efforts and contributions over the years".

In September 2020, The Education University of Hong Kong, with the help of the Li Ka Shing Foundation, partnered with Kneron to build Hong Kong's first AI educational system.

In November 2023, the university announced that students would have to undergo mandatory national security education.

== Academic organisation ==
There are three faculties and a number of non-faculty academic units at the university, which provide study programmes and courses for students.

The Graduate School was established in April 2010 to support EdUHK (the then HKIEd) in the management and quality assurance of its higher degree programmes.

=== Faculties ===
- Faculty of Liberal Arts and Social Sciences
- Faculty of Education and Human Development
- Faculty of Humanities
- Graduate School

=== Research centres ===
- Academy of Hong Kong Studies (AHKS)
- Assessment Research Centre (ARC)
- Centre for Governance and Citizenship (CGC)
- The Joseph Lau Luen Hung Charitable Trust Asia Pacific Centre for Leadership and Change (APCLC)

== Major facilities ==
=== Sports centre ===
The 5.3-hectare (13-acre) Sports Centre is located at 55 Yau King Lane, Tai Po Kau, facing Tolo Harbour. It houses a range of outdoor and indoor sports and recreational facilities including:

- grandstand with undercover seating for 1,200 spectators
- 400-metre all-weather track with facilities for field events
- natural grass soccer pitch
- artificial turf soccer / hockey pitch
- five tennis courts
- jogging path with six fitness stations
- fitness room
- parking spaces

== Reputation and rankings ==
University rankings

Global – Overall
- QS World: =530 (2026)

Regional – Overall
- QS Asia: =212 (2025)

According to the 2018 QS World University Rankings: "In the field of Education, it is ranked the ninth in the world and the second in Asia; in the field of linguistics, it is ranked the 151-200th in the world; in the field of Psychology, it is ranked the 251-300th in the world; in the field of Social Science and Management, it is ranked the 323rd in the world".

== Controversy over the proposed HKIEd-CUHK merger ==
In January 2007, a public row broke out between the management and the government over the future of the institute. Battle lines were drawn between the Vice-Chancellor Paul Morris and then Secretary for Education and Manpower, Prof. Arthur Li. The dispute had apparently been brewing for some time, as far back as June 2002, when the Arthur Li was appointed secretary. Apparently, Li favoured a merger of the institute with The Chinese University of Hong Kong (CUHK), where he was vice-chancellor. Morris opposed the merger, and had for some time been campaigning to establish the institute as a university in its own right. Morris maintained he had been warned by the Chairman of the council, Dr. Thomas Leung Kwok-fai, as far back as June 2006, that his tenure would end unless he agreed to the amalgamation of the institute with the CUHK.

=== Timeline ===
- 24 June 2002 – Shortly after Li's appointment as Education Secretary, Li had apparently invited Morris to dinner and proposed a merger of the institute with the Chinese University. Li also apparently offered Morris to head the "super education centre".
- 19 July 2002 – Morris was allegedly told by Simon Ip Sik-on, a former chairman of the institute's council, during a lunch he shared with Li and two other senior institute officials that Li threatened to render the institute unviable if a merger could not be achieved.
- 14 October 2002 – Fanny Law had met with Arthur Li, Dr. Leung and its former vice chairman Alfred Chan Wing-kin. She issued an "internal email" to staff, stating the institute's wish for an early indication of a possible merger with the education faculty of the CUHK.
- 25 January 2007 – The governing council of the institute decided in a vote of 10 to 3, with three abstentions, not to renew Vice Chancellor Morris' contract. Leung denied Morris' assertion about the threats to the security of his tenure, instead accusing Morris of misinterpreting him. Leung insisted that there was no connection between the two. This led to speculation that the Education and Manpower Bureau (EMB) was trying to force an amalgamation of the institute with the CUHK.
- 26 January 2007 – Deputy Vice Chancellor Professor Bernard Luk Hung-kay (陸鴻基) alleged on RTHK Radio 1's Openline Openview phone-in program that during the summer of 2003, after results of the Language Proficiency Assessment for Teachers were released, the media reported (falsely) that most of 330 teachers who had failed in the test were from The Hong Kong Institute of Education. Professor Luk accused Law for not having set the record straight and alleged that this publicity resulted in a sharp fall in the number of applications for the next year, though the numbers had since recovered through hard work of the staff.
  Prof Luk also corroborated Vice Chancellor Morris' version of events by revealing a secret breakfast meeting that took place between Dr. Leung and the Vice Chancellor in June 2006.
- 5 February 2007 – Luk alleged both in his open letter and on RTHK Radio 1's Openline Openview program that Li had made veiled threats both against him and Morris in the past. For their refusal to make a news release denouncing those teachers who exceeded the placement quota for their profession and who were about to lose their current jobs, Arthur Li was quoted by Luk to have said on 26/27 June 2004, "I'll remember this. You will pay." (The quote was said in English). Luk suggests in his letter that the time is up for his "pound of flesh."
  Luk also alleged that during January 2004, Li had phoned Morris to once again urge Morris to take the lead in amalgamating with CUHK. He threatened to reduce future student intake quotas of HKIEd otherwise.
  Luk pointed out that there had been numerous newspaper articles written by IEd staff members in the past few years criticizing the EMB education reform and policies. Luk maintained this resulted in a number of phone calls from a certain high-ranking official in the EMB, demanding the immediate dismissals of those four staff members, which they refused to entertain.
- 6 February 2007 – Staff members Leung Yan-wing (梁恩榮) and Ip Kin-yuen (葉建源) asked Legco to investigate further or set up an open hearing into the allegations. Legco member Cheung Man Kwong told RTHK Radio 1's Openline Openview phone-in program that he along with eight other Democratic camp members had already written to Legco's Education Committee chairman Tsang Yok-sing, urging him to convene an emergency meeting to investigate these allegations of government interference in the running of IEd. Students overwhelmingly passed vote of no-confidence in Governing Board Chairman Thomas Leung Kwok-fai: of 680 the voters, only 36 students backed Leung. There were 65 abstentions and eight voided ballot papers.
- 7 February 2007 – It was announced that Legco's Education Committee would convene on 12 February 2007 to discuss any further action and that it would invite both IEd representatives and Arthur Li himself if necessary.
- 9 March 2007 – Pro-government legislators blocked an attempt to set up a Legco inquiry to investigate allegations over meddling with the academic freedom and autonomy of educational institutions. The vote failed by 30:21 with one abstention.
- Chief Executive Donald Tsang set up a commission headed by Justice Woo Kwok-hing.
- 16 March 2007 – Justice Woo Kwok-hing resigned to avoid potential accusations of lack of impartiality.
- 22 March 2007 – Commission hearings commenced.
- 20 June 2007 – The commission dismissed allegations that Li had interfered with the institutional autonomy, but pinned the blame on Fanny Law. Law resigned immediately from her post of Commissioner of the Independent Commission Against Corruption.
- 13 March 2009 – the Secretary for Education took out a judicial review application to challenge the commission's findings in 2007. In recognising that academic freedom is a self-contained right under Articles 34 and 137 of the Basic Law, the Court of First Instance held that the Permanent Secretary's (Mrs Fanny Law) approach did not violate the institute's right to academic freedom as she had not made any direct or indirect threats of sanction. The judicial review was allowed in March 2009.

== See also ==
- Category:Alumni of the Education University of Hong Kong
- Education in Hong Kong
- Higher Education in Hong Kong
- List of universities in Hong Kong
- List of buildings and structures in Hong Kong
- Hong Kong Mathematics Olympiad
