= Hong Kong College of Technology =

Private college in Hong Kong

- 香港專業進修學校
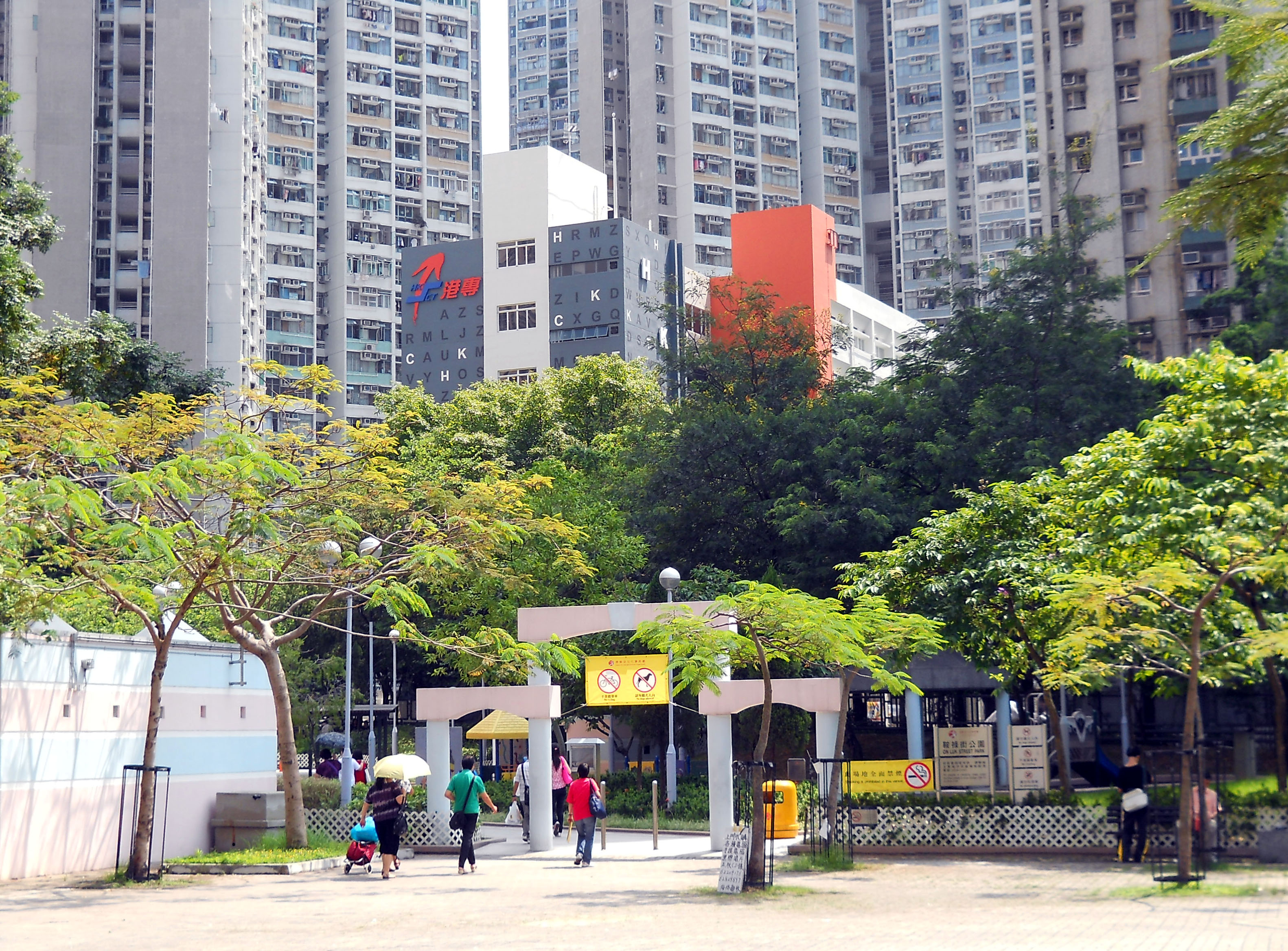
- Ma On Shan Campus
- Former name: Mongkok Workers' Night School
- Type: Private
- Established: 1 August 1947; 79 years ago
- Parent institution: HKCT Group Limited
- Chairperson: Lau Pui-king
- Vice-president: Wong Wai-han
- Principal: Chan Cheuk-hay
- Director: Kung Pui-ying, Jolly
- Location: 22°19′10″N 114°10′44″E
- Campus: Urban and new town
- Location: Hong Kong
- Website: hkct.edu.hk

Chinese name
- Simplified Chinese: 香港专业进修学校
- Traditional Chinese: 香港專業進修學校
Transcriptions
Standard Mandarin
- Hanyu Pinyin: Xiānggǎng Zhuānyè Jìnxiū Xuéxiào
Yue: Cantonese
- Yale Romanization: Hēunggóng Jyūnyihp Jeunsāu Hohkhaauh
- Jyutping: Hoeng^{1}gong^{2} Zyun^{1}yip^{6} Zeon^{3}sau^{1} Hok^{6}haau^{6}
- Location within Hong Kong

The Hong Kong College of Technology (HKCT, Chinese: 香港專業進修學校) is a private vocational college in Hong Kong that provides a range of sub-degree programmes. It was founded on 1 August 1947 as the Mong Kok Workers' Night School. A subsidiary established in 2014, HKCT Institute of Higher Education (CTIHE), is legally able to award degrees.

== History ==
=== Establishment ===
The HKCT was founded as the Mongkok Workers' Night School (Chinese: 旺角工人夜校) by the Hong Kong Kowloon Labour Education Association (HKKLEA) in 1947. It was the last of five workers' night schools set up by the HKKLEA in the 1940s and 1950s. In the same era, the HKKLEA also set up 12 schools for the children of labourers, including the Mongkok Workers' Children School, which still exists under a different name. The HKKLEA was later merged into the Hong Kong Federation of Trade Unions (FTU), a pro-Beijing political party. The workers' night schools promoted the values of the new communist regime in Beijing, and sought to build a pro-communist community in Hong Kong.

The MKWNS benefited from the growing demand for vocational training and education in Hong Kong during the 1960s and 1970s, culminating in the establishment of the Vocational Training Council in 1973. To meet the growing need for education and technical certification, the MKWNS began to offer the Electrical/ Electronic Certificate (C&G271) which qualified students to sit the telecommunications technicians examination of the City and Guilds of London Institute.

=== Renaming ===
The 1967 riots turned public sentiment against communists in Hong Kong. Coupled with financial issues and ageing leadership, the workers' night schools began to suffer. The five schools were "restructured" in 1979, and all but the Mongkok Workers' Night School were closed. In the 1980s, as it became clear that Hong Kong's sovereignty would be transferred to China in 1997, the school's anti-colonial mission became obsolete. In response, the institute began offering more mainstream courses in line with international standards. It also began co-operating with international corporations to offer more professional vocational courses. On 30 March 1987, the MKWNS officially changed its name to the Hong Kong College of Technology.

== HKCT Institute of Higher education ==
In 2014, the school established the HKCT Institute of Higher Education (CTIHE), which is empowered under the Post-Secondary Colleges Ordinance (Cap. 320) to award post-secondary degrees. In the same year, CTIHE began to offer a sole degree programme, the Bachelor of Social Sciences (Honours) in Social Development Studies programme.

For the 2015–16 school year, CTIHE aimed to enrol 25 bachelor's degree students to this programme. However, no students were actually admitted. In this regard, CTIHE performed worst among 19 self-financing degree-awarding institutions. In March 2016, CTIHE received approval from the Hong Kong Council for Accreditation of Academic and Vocational Qualifications (HKCAAVQ) to add a new stream in Social Innovation and the Environment to the programme. This was approved by the Executive Council and chief executive on 6 September 2016.

According to June 2017 data from the Education Bureau, HKCT has 419 sub-degree students, but still did not have any students enrolled in undergraduate degree programmes.

== Campuses ==
The college has three main campuses:

- Jockey Club Undergraduate Campus, 2 On Shing Street, Ma On Shan
- Jockey Club Ma On Shan Campus, Yiu On Estate, 2 Hang Hong Street, Ma On Shan
- Ho Man Tin Campus, 14 Princess Margaret Road, Ho Man Tin

== Facilities ==
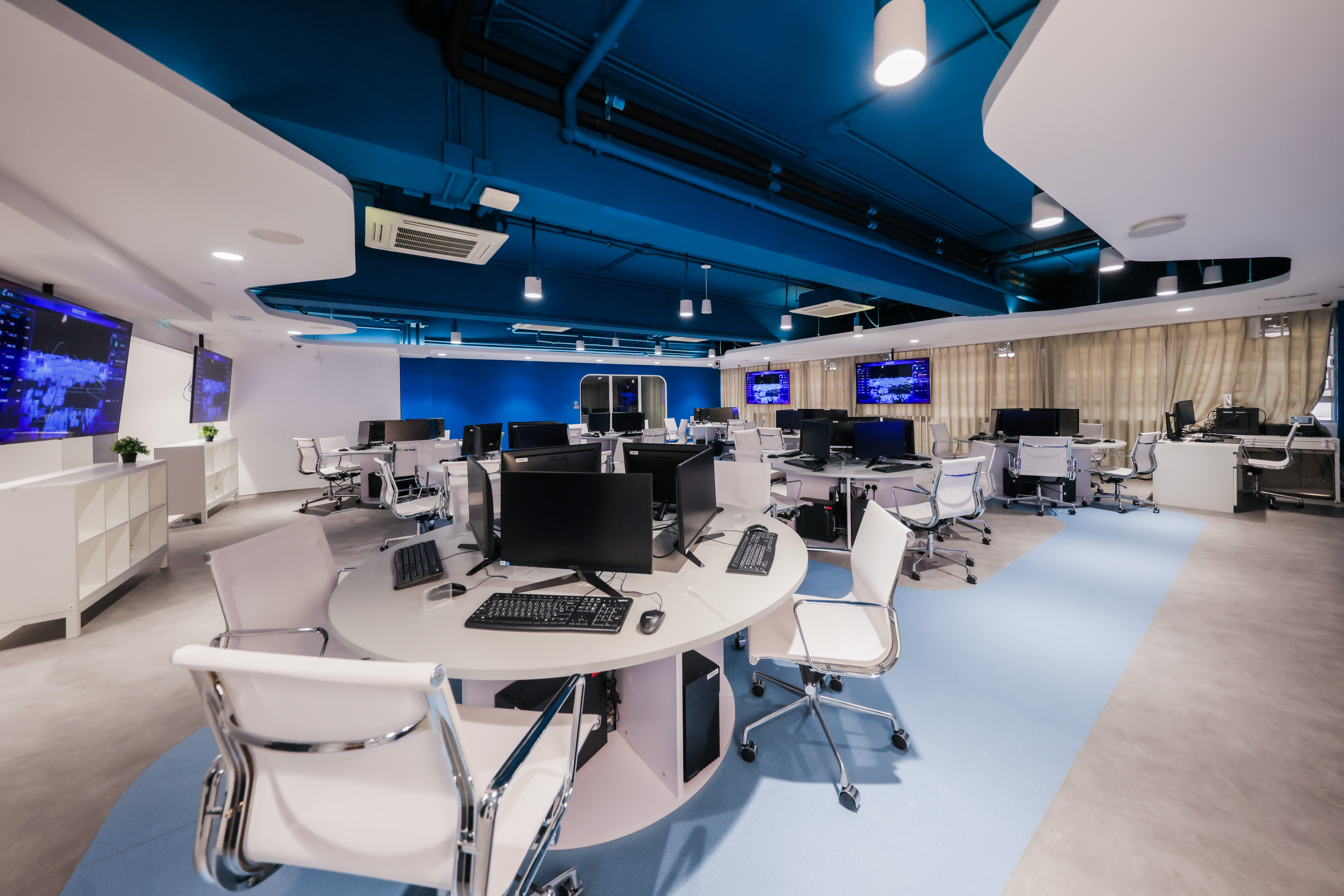
Network Testing Range and Training Center

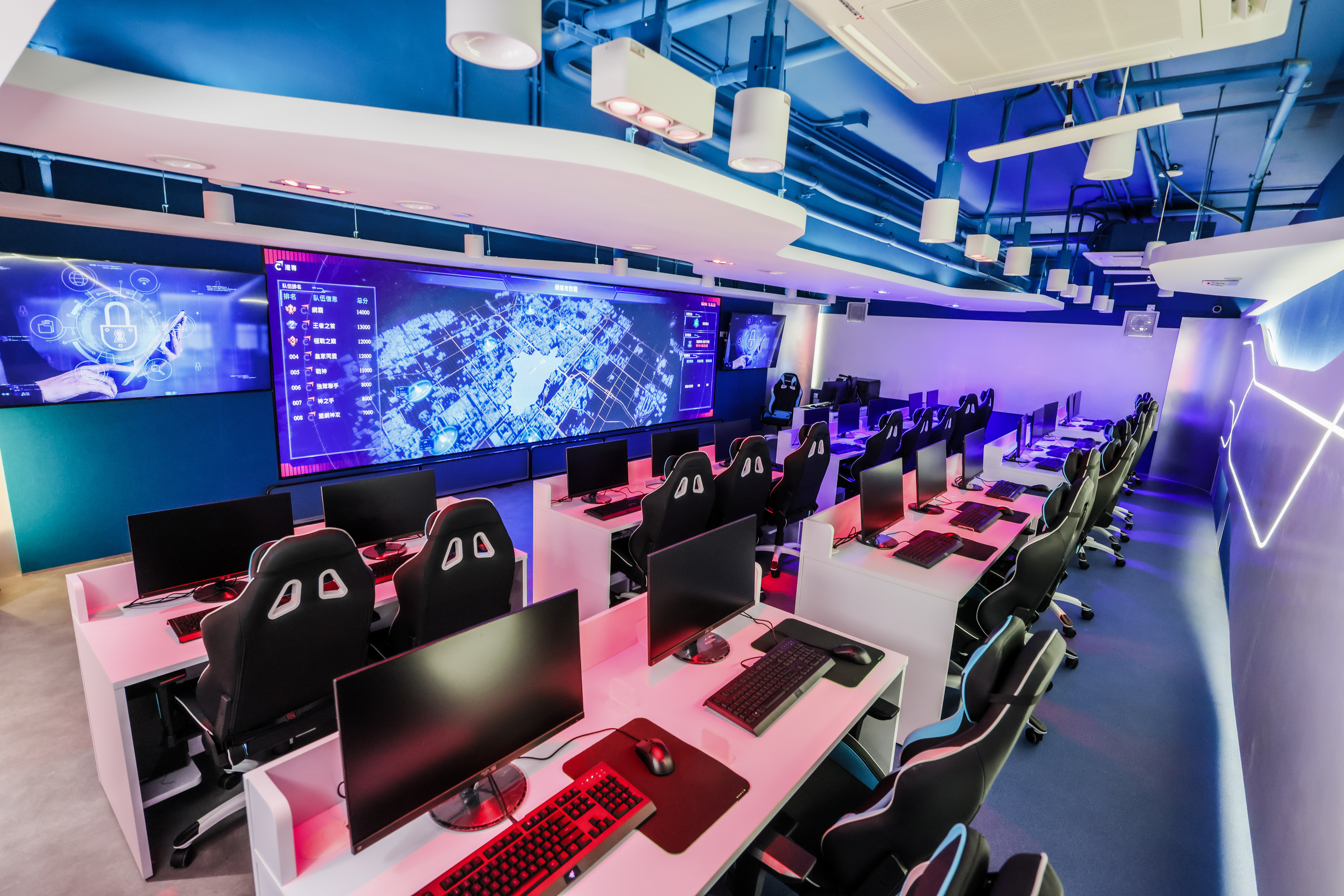
Cybersecurity Operations Center

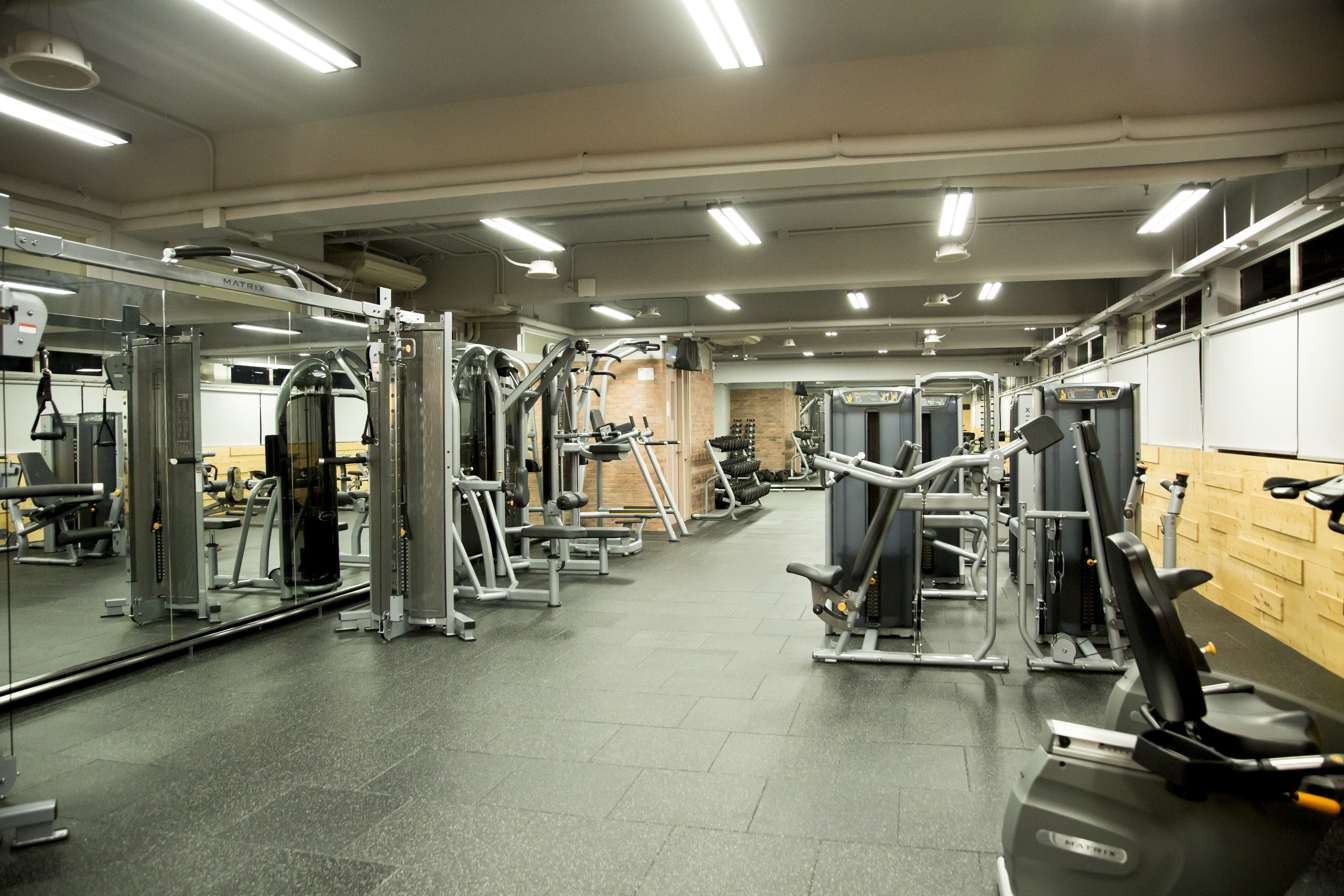
Gym

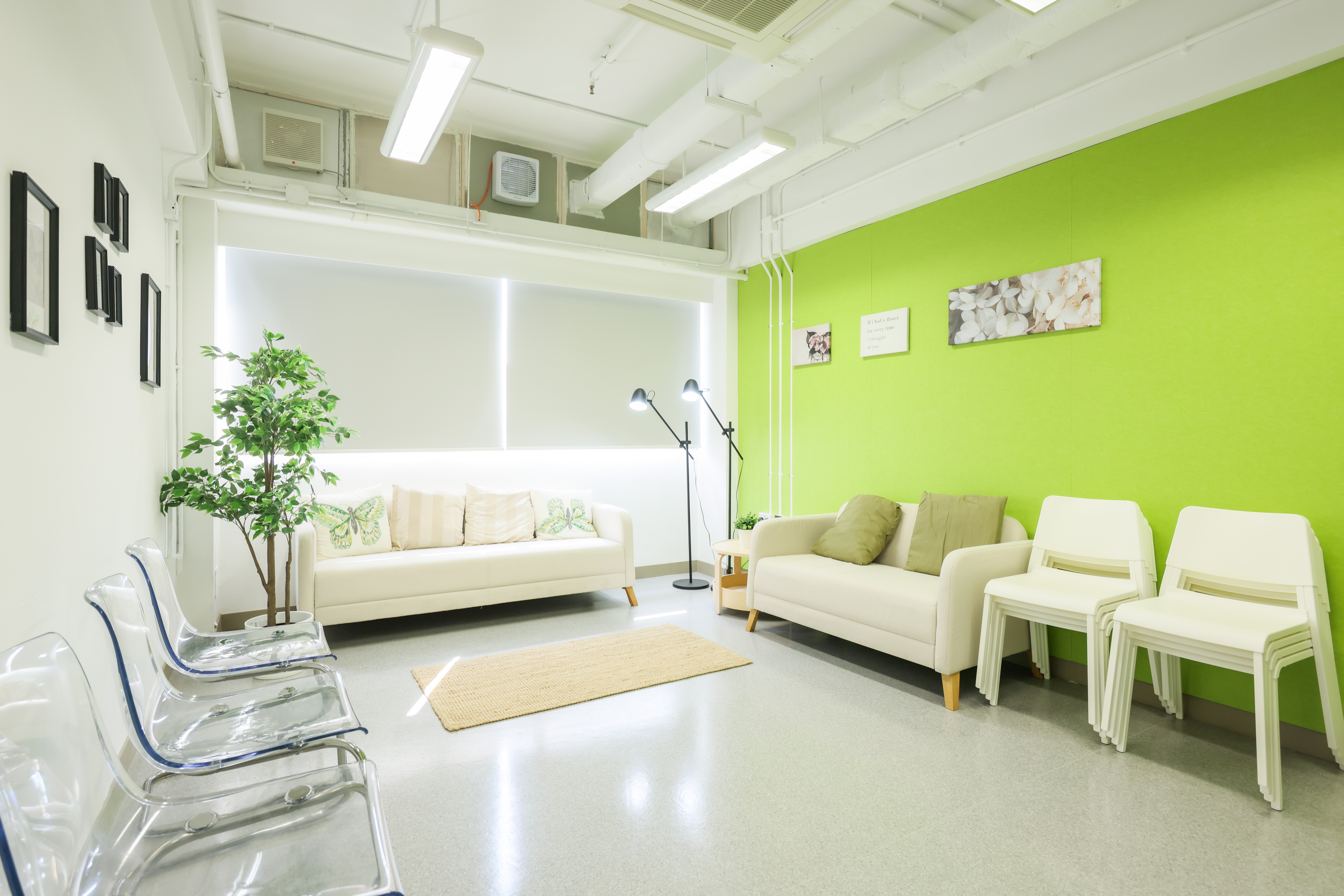
Social Work Practice Center

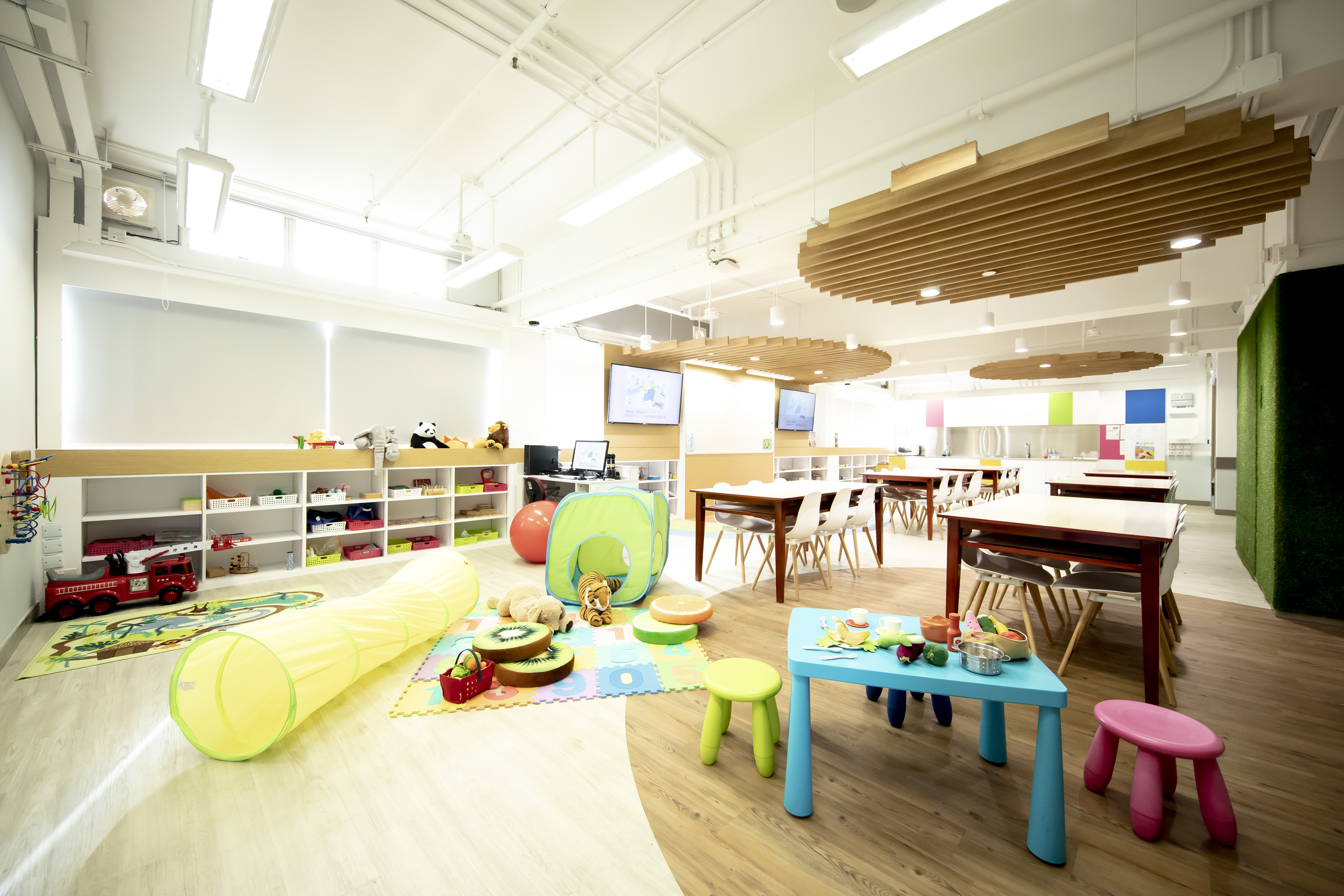
Fairy Tale Corner (Early Childhood Education Center)

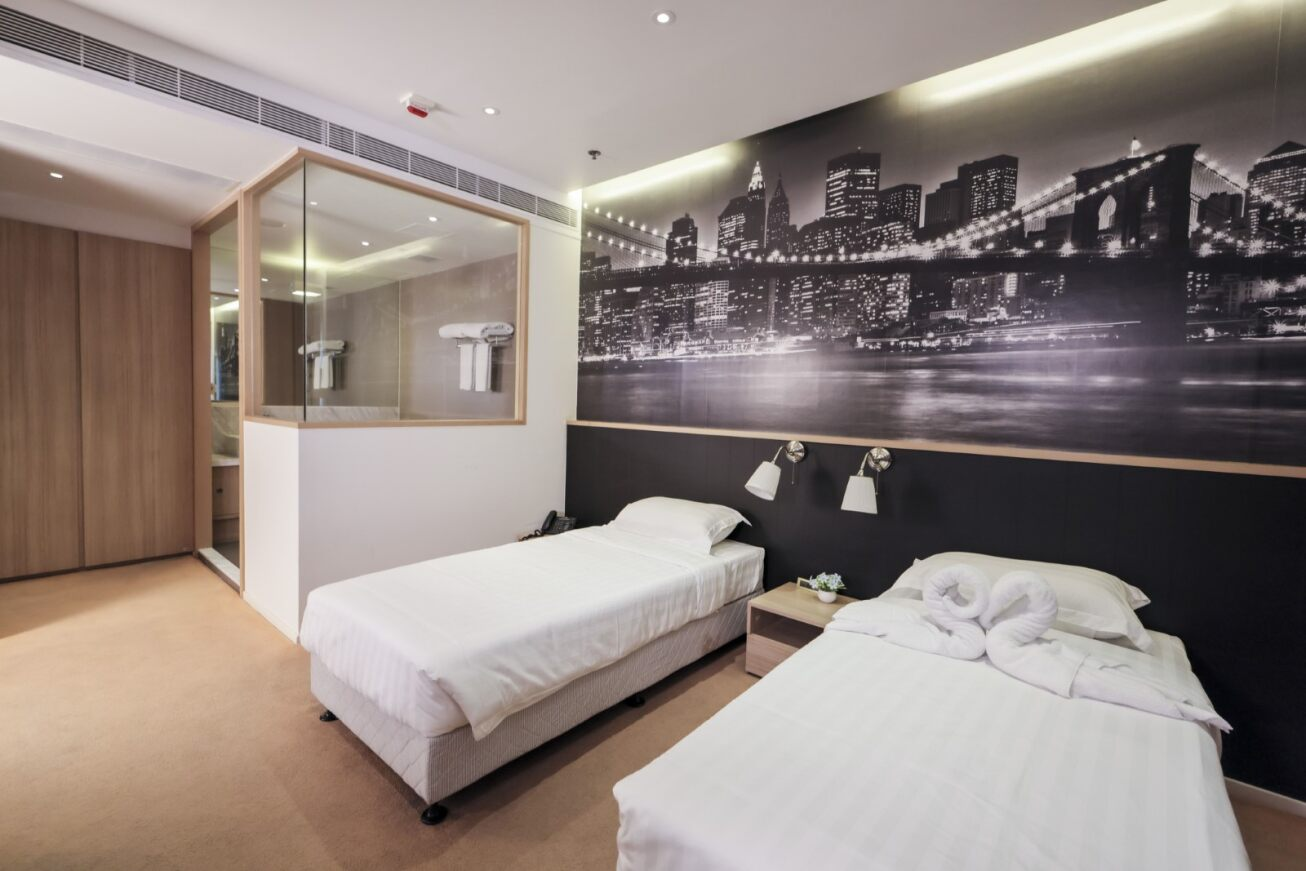
Simulated Hotel Room

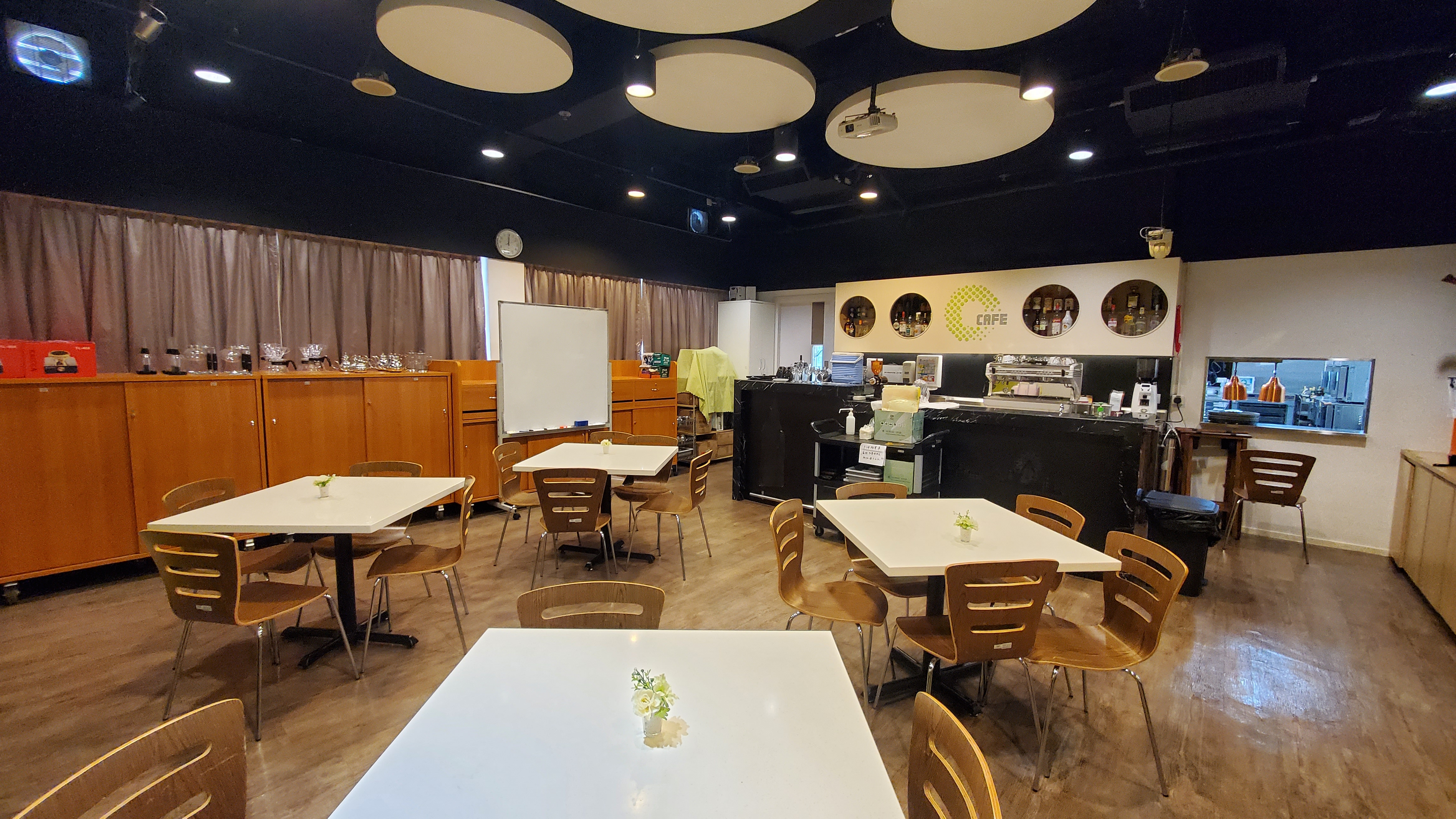
Catering Training Center (Restaurant)

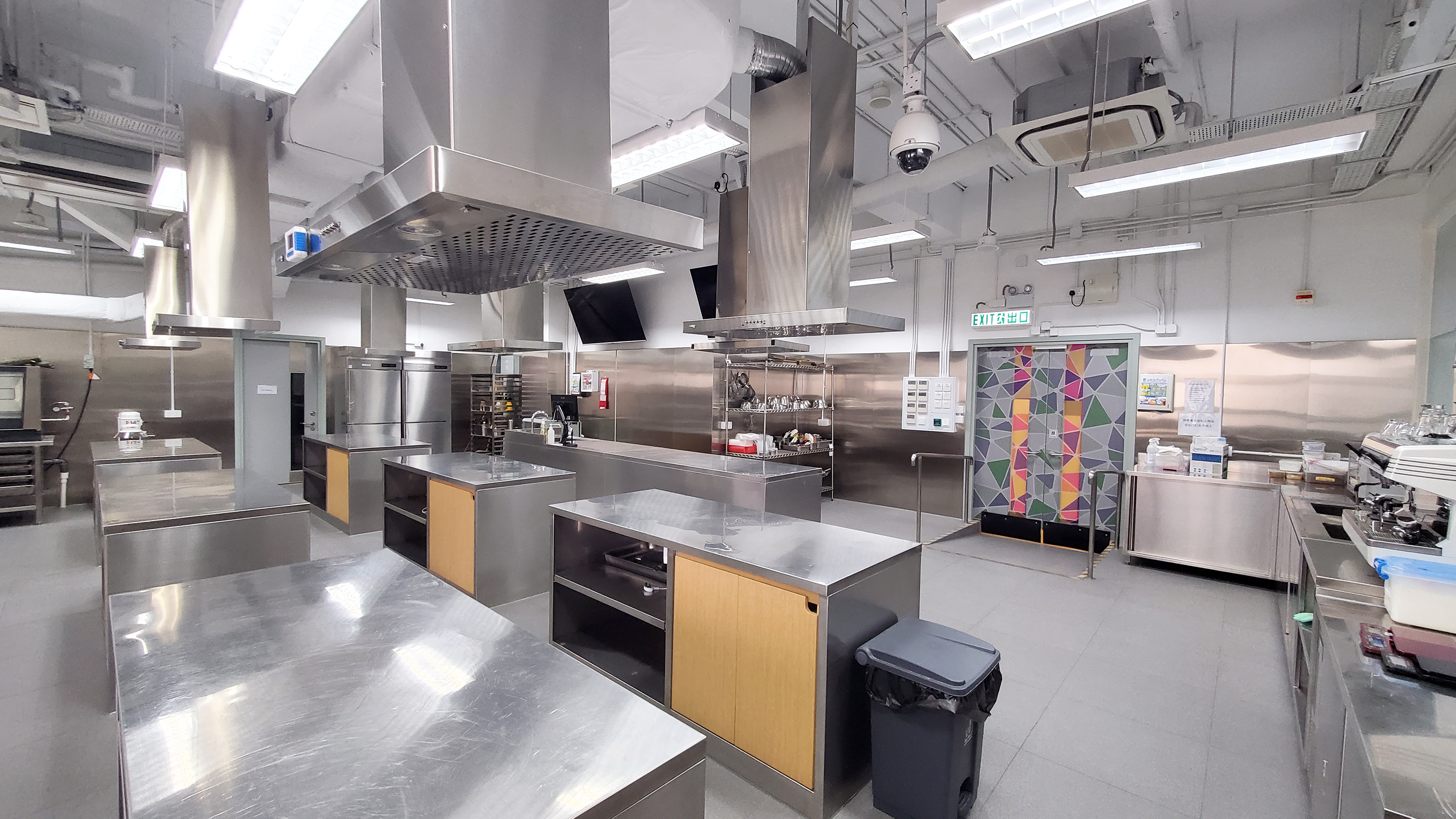
Culinary Arts Workshop

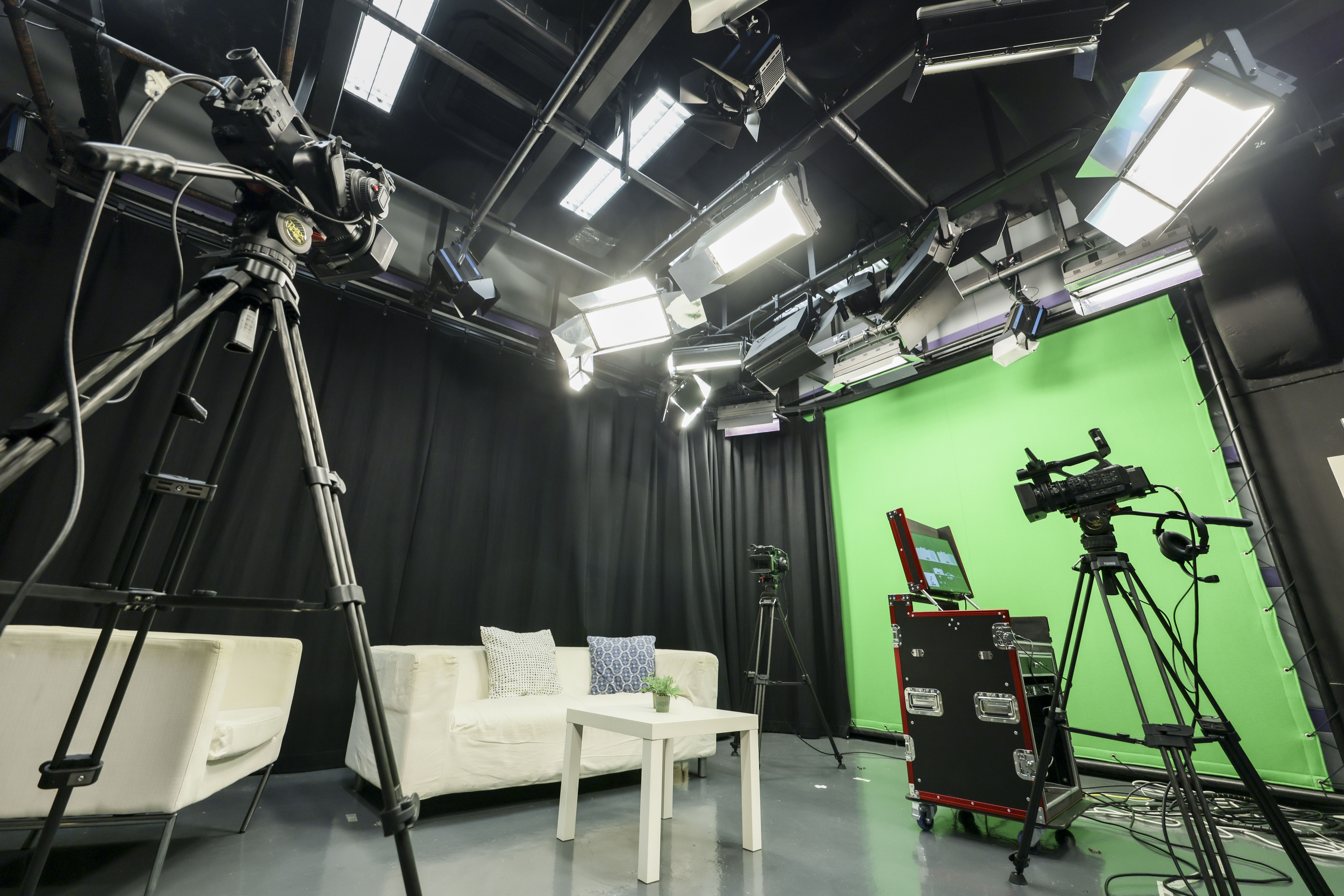
Digital Media Production Studio

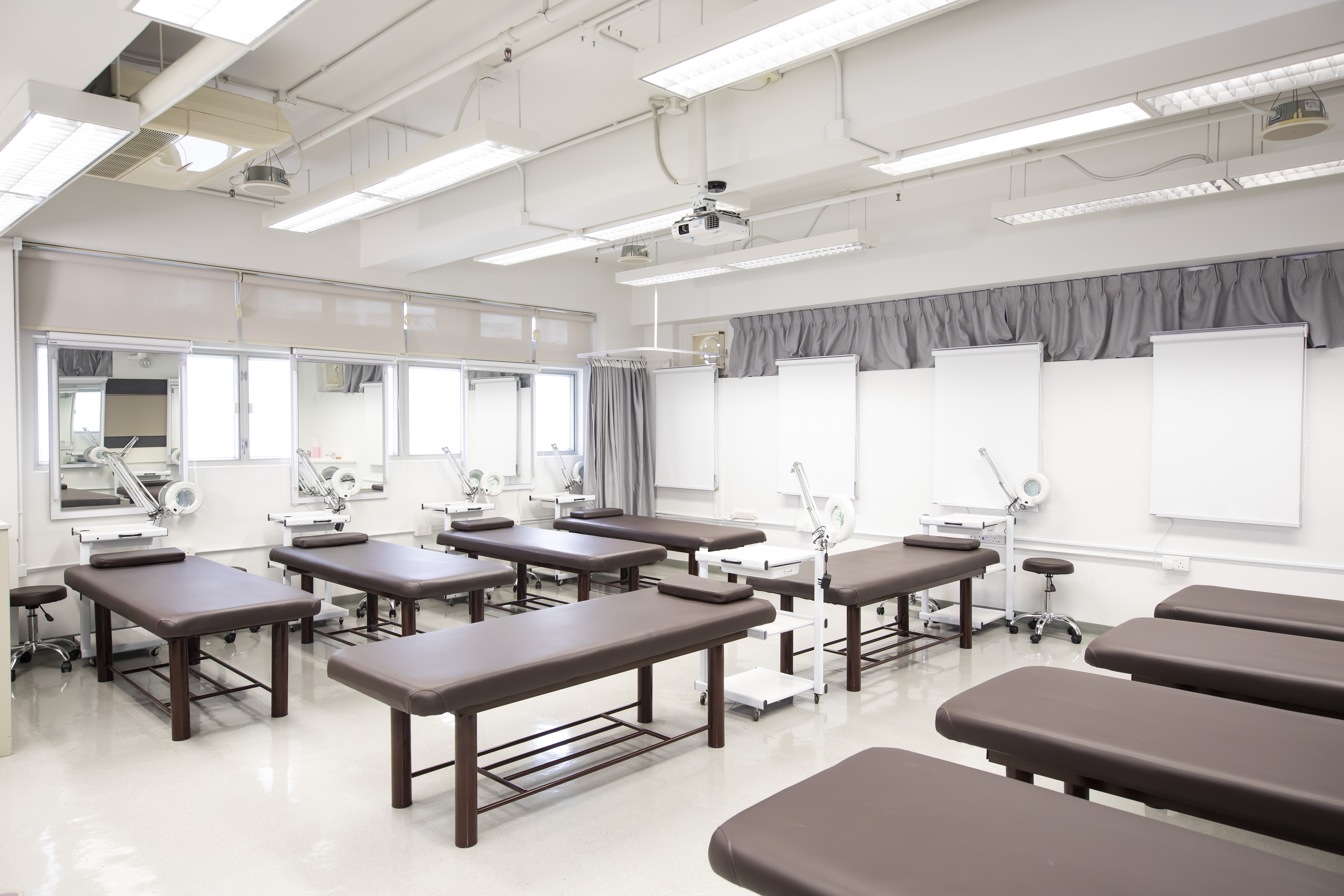
Beauty and Body Shaping Practice Studio

== Government Funding ==
=== "Designated Programmes/Subjects Scheme" (SSSDP) ===
HKCT's four full-time locally accredited Advanced Diploma programmes are included in the Education Bureau's "Designated Programmes/Subjects Scheme" (SSSDP). These programmes cover fields such as Computer Science, Creative Industries, Sports and Recreation, and Tourism and Hospitality. Among these programmes, "Advanced Diploma in Creative Design and Media (Digital Imaging/Visual Communication)," "Advanced Diploma in Computer Studies (Mobile Application and Game Development)," and Advanced Diplomas in Fitness, Coaching, and Sports Management have the lowest tuition fees compared to similar programmes at other institutions.

=== "Financial Assistance Scheme for Self-financing Undergraduate Studies" (NMTSS) ===
Eligible local students who enroll in full-time Bachelor of Social Work (Hons) and Bachelor of Sports Science and Management (Hons) programmes can receive an annual government subsidy

== Freedom of expression controversy ==
HKCT maintains a reputation as a patriotic institution, and is governed by a "Beijing-friendly" board. Controversy erupted in 2017 after the school ordered two social work graduands to leave their graduation ceremony at the college's Ma On Shan campus for refusing to stand during the playing of March of the Volunteers, the national anthem of the People's Republic of China. After ordering the students to stand to no avail, school management suspended the ceremony and ordered the pair to leave. Ten other students left in solidarity with the pair. The 12 students were thus not awarded their certificates.

Reportedly, school management had previously delivered a warning against disrespecting the national anthem, but the students felt that this ran contrary to their right to freedom of expression, a fundamental right of Hong Kong people enshrined in Article 27 of the Basic Law, Hong Kong's constitution. The school principal, Chan Cheuk-hay, had also reportedly admonished students for similarly "insulting the anthem" during a graduation ceremony the year before. In November 2017, the Standing Committee of the National People's Congress made disrespecting the national anthem a criminal offence in mainland China with a maximum punishment of three years in prison. The Hong Kong Government has said it would introduce legislation to effect the same punishment in Hong Kong. In response to the graduation ceremony incident, HKCT students accused the school of trying to enforce this so-called "national anthem law" before it has been implemented in Hong Kong.

Hong Kong's chief executive, Carrie Lam, praised the school and the school principal. She stated that "any behaviour that disrespects the national anthem should not be tolerated in Hong Kong", and implored Hongkongers to defend the anthem even though the national anthem law has not yet been enacted in the territory. Pro-Beijing legislator Priscilla Leung commented, "school regulations are the best way to make students get used to respecting their own country. I appreciate the principal very much." On the other hand, pro-democracy lawmaker Shiu Ka-chun accused the school of putting political ideology ahead of education.

== Notable alumni ==
- Roy Kwong – social worker and politician
- Oscar Lai – former Scholarism member and Demosistō co-founder
- Luk Sung-hung: Member of the Legislative Council of Hong Kong, former council member of the Yuen Long District Council (Tin Hang)
- Chiu Chu-bong: Former council member of the Sha Tin District Council (Pok Hong)
- Yan Tsz-long: Host at Radio Television Hong Kong
- Lee Man-fong: Host and actor at TVB

== Event ==
There are seven institutions in Hong Kong that offer the Yi Jin Diploma program, with Hong Kong College of Technology (HKCT) ranking first in the number of applications for both full-time and part-time Yi Jin Diploma programs for two consecutive years. According to HKCT's 2019-20 graduate survey, 100% of full-time Yi Jin Diploma graduates successfully pursued further studies or employment within six months of graduation.

On 4 December 2021, HKCT, in collaboration with the Hong Kong Olympic Academy, hosted The Tokyo 2020 Olympic Games Mainland Olympic Athlete Delegation Visit Hong Kong" meeting at the Ma On Shan HKCT Jockey Club Undergraduate Campus. The event welcomed six gold medal athletes and their coaches, who engaged in interactive sessions with over 200 local primary, secondary, and tertiary students. The event was warm and lively, co-organised by the General Administration of Sport of China, Liaison Office of the Central People’s Government in the HKSAR, and The Government of the Hong Kong Special Administrative Region of the People's Republic of China, with assistance from the Hong Kong Olympic Academy and HKCT. Attendees included Mr. Kevin Yeung Yun-hung, the Secretary for Education; Mr. WANG Kaibo, the Deputy Director of Department of Publicity, Cultural and Sports Affairs of the Liaison Office of the Central People's Government in the HKSAR; and Mr. WEI Xinyi, the Director of the General Administration of Sport of China.

== See also ==
- List of higher education institutions in Hong Kong
