= University Grants Committee (Hong Kong) =

Advisory committee

- 大學教育資助委員會
- Abbreviation: UGC
- Formation: 1965
- Type: Non-statutory body
- Headquarters: Shui On Centre, 6-8 Harbour Road, Wan Chai, Hong Kong
- Coordinates: 22.280401°N 114.171503°E
- Official language: English
- Secretary General: James Tang Tuck-hong
- Chairman: Carlson Tong
- Main organ: University Grants Committee Secretariat
- Subsidiaries: Quality Assurance Council; Research Grants Council
- Budget: $22,791.6m (2020–21)
- Website: ugc.edu.hk
- Formerly called: University and Polytechnic Grants Committee

University Grants Committee
- Traditional Chinese: 大學教育資助委員會
- Simplified Chinese: 大学教育资助委员会
Transcriptions
Standard Mandarin
- Hanyu Pinyin: Dàxué Jiàoyù Zīzhù Wěiyuánhuì
Yue: Cantonese
- Yale Romanization: Daaih hohk gaau yuhk jī joh wái yùhn wuih
- Jyutping: Daai^{6} hok^{6} gaau^{3} juk^{6} zi^{1} zo^{6} wai^{2} jyun^{4} wui^{6}

The University Grants Committee of Hong Kong is a non-statutory advisory committee responsible for counselling the Government of Hong Kong on the financing and expansion needs of its subsidised higher education institutions. Appointed by the Chief Executive of Hong Kong, its members consist of local and overseas academics, university administrators, and community leaders.

== List ==
There are eight universities funded by the University Grants Committee:

- University of Hong Kong
- Chinese University of Hong Kong
- Hong Kong University of Science and Technology
- Hong Kong Polytechnic University
- City University of Hong Kong
- Hong Kong Baptist University
- Lingnan University
- Education University of Hong Kong

== Quality Assurance Council ==
The Quality Assurance Council (QAC), established in April 2007, is a semi-autonomous non-statutory body operating under the purview of the committee to facilitate quality assurance of all programmes at the levels of sub-degree, first degree and above (however funded), offered by the UGC-funded universities.

== Research Grants Council ==
The Research Grants Council (RGC), established in January 1991, is a non-statutory advisory council functioning under the aegis of the committee. It is responsible for providing suggestions to the Government on the needs of Hong Kong's higher education institutions in academic research and distribution of funding for research projects undertaken by the UGC-funded universities.

== See also ==
- List of higher education institutions in Hong Kong
- Higher education in Hong Kong
- Education in Hong Kong
- Education Bureau
- University Grants Commission (disambiguation)
- Self-financing Higher Education in Hong Kong
