= Hong Kong Shue Yan University =

Private university in North Point

Coordinates: 22.2862°N 114.198°E

- 香港樹仁大學
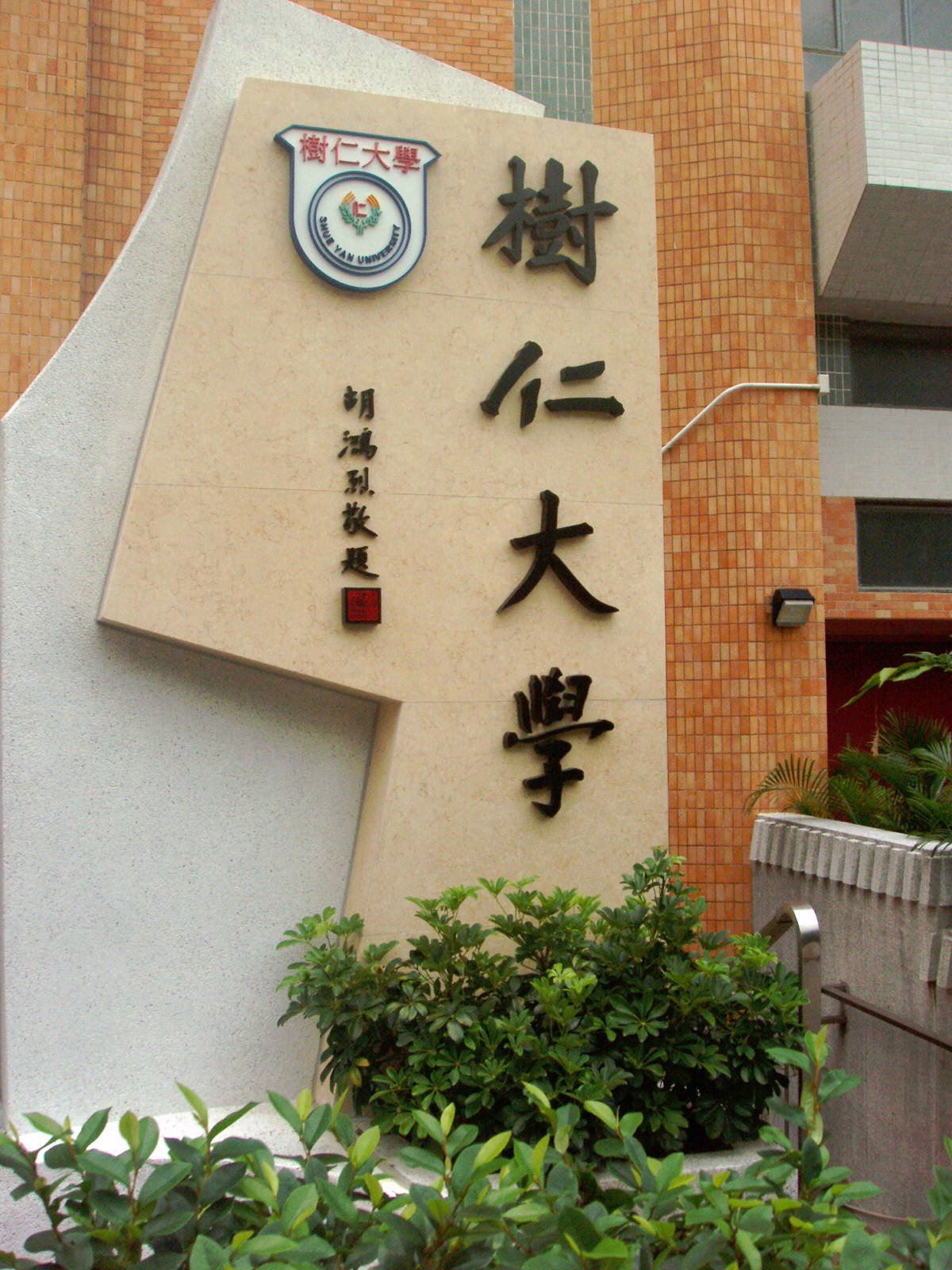
- Hong Kong Shue Yan University's logo
- Former name: Shue Yan College
- Motto: 敦仁博物
- Motto in English: Cultivating virtues of benevolence; broadening horizon and knowledge
- Type: Private
- Established: 1971 (as Hong Kong Shue Yan College); 2006 (granted university status)
- Affiliations: ASAIHL
- Chairman: Dennis Ting
- President: Vacant
- Provost: Hu Yao Su
- Faculty: 279
- Undergraduates: 5,132 (2014–15)
- Location: 10 Wai Tsui Crescent, Braemar Hill, North Point, Hong Kong
- Campus: Urban
- Website: hksyu.edu hksyu.edu.hk

Chinese name
- Traditional Chinese: 香港樹仁大學
- Simplified Chinese: 香港树仁大学
- Cantonese Yale: Hēung góng syuh yàhn daaih hohk
Transcriptions
Standard Mandarin
- Hanyu Pinyin: Xiānggǎng Shùrén Dàxué
Yue: Cantonese
- Yale Romanization: Hēung góng syuh yàhn daaih hohk
- Jyutping: Hoeng1 gong2 syu6 jan4 daai6 hok6

Hong Kong Shue Yan College
- Traditional Chinese: 香港樹仁學院
- Simplified Chinese: 香港树仁学院
- Cantonese Yale: Hēung góng syuh yàhn hohk yuhn
Transcriptions
Standard Mandarin
- Hanyu Pinyin: Xiānggǎng Shùrén Xuéyuàn
Yue: Cantonese
- Yale Romanization: Hēung góng syuh yàhn hohk yuhn
- Jyutping: Hoeng1gong2 syu6jan4 hok6 jyun6*2

Hong Kong Shue Yan University (HKSYU or SYU) is a private liberal arts university on North Point, Hong Kong Island, Hong Kong.

Founded in 1971 as Hong Kong Shue Yan College (香港樹仁學院) by Henry Hu and Chung Chi-yung, it was unilaterally recognised as the first private university by the order of the Chief Executive on 19 December 2006. According to the QS World University Rankings 2027, it ranked 1001–1200th worldwide. The QS Asia University Rankings 2026 placed it at 360th in Asia and 175th in Eastern Asia.

== History ==
Hong Kong Shue Yan College was founded on 20 September 1971 by Dr Henry H.L. Hu, then Legislative Councillor, and Dr Chung Chi-Yung, a prominent educationist.

In 1971, Dr Chung resigned from her post as faculty head of the Faculty of Arts and Social Sciences of the then Hong Kong Baptist College and planned to establish a kindergarten. However, her husband, Dr Hu, suggested founding a university instead and invested his savings from his work as a barrister in it, purchasing a three-story house at Sing Woo Road, Happy Valley as campus. They were concerned that provision for tertiary education in Hong Kong was made for less than 2% of the relevant age group and also that the Cultural Revolution in mainland China would undermine traditional Chinese values.

The government of Hong Kong at the time was interested in the prospects of an independent, private liberal arts school, and granted a piece of land at Braemar Hill to construct a permanent campus in 1978. The construction was completed in September 1985, and various additions to the campus were constructed after that time.

Due to Shue Yan's refusal to follow the government's model and plan for higher education in return for government funding in the late 1970s, Shue Yan development was often restricted. Shue Yan's unrelenting position to offer four-year programmes meant that it had to operate as a truly private institution, without any government funding. Because of this, Shue Yan cannot meet the three-year university degree requirement and has to refer itself as a college rather than a university. However it provided an opportunity to access higher education for students who were unable to secure a place at a local university.

In 2000, the Education Bureau of Hong Kong provided a fund of HKD 4.6 million for academic accreditation. In 2001, Hong Kong Shue Yan College passed the academic accreditation of the Hong Kong Council for Accreditation of Academic and Vocational Qualifications and was allowed to offer three courses leading to different Honours bachelor's degrees. In the same year, the Hong Kong Government amended the Post Secondary Colleges Ordinance (Cap 320), allowing accredited post secondary colleges to award degrees under the approval of the Chief Executive-in-Council. Hong Kong Shue Yan College thus became the first private tertiary education institute in Hong Kong that can award Honours bachelor's degrees.

On 19 December 2006, the Executive Council passed a resolution to recognise and accredit Hong Kong Shue Yan College as Hong Kong's first private university, with immediate effect. Hong Kong Shue Yan College subsequently rectified its name to Hong Kong Shue Yan University. It was the first time a university had been established via Executive Council resolution. All other universities in Hong Kong have been established by ordinance approved by the Legislative Council of the HKSAR.

As there is a shortage of government-funded degrees, there were plans for SYU and the OUHK to participate in JUPAS as alternatives for students. While the OUHK has accepted and designed some programmes specifically for such students since 2006, SYU announced they would not be participating in JUPAS in the foreseeable future. SYU become the only university in Hong Kong that declined to join JUPAS and UGC.

In January 2007, the HKSAR government offered a one-time grant of HKD200 million (although possibly less) to establish a general development fund for SYU. The University may use the interest to support its academic development and improve the campus facilities.

== Campus ==
The SYU campus is situated on Braemar Hill on Hong Kong Island, and offers a view of the Victoria Harbour. The land the campus rests on was granted by the Hong Kong Government in 1978, with the first building completed in 1985.

The campus consists of four parts:

- Education and Administration Complex (教學行政大樓)- Completed construction in 1985, the complex is 11 stories high and houses classrooms, computer labs, lecture halls, ceremony halls, cafeterias, sports facilities, and staff offices.
- Library Complex (圖書館大樓)- Completed construction in 1995, the complex is 19 stories high, and houses the campus library, car park, conference hall and apartments for academic staff.
- Residential & Amenities Complex (宿舍文康大樓)- Completed construction in 2005, the complex is 29 stories high, and houses student dormitories, student services, swimming pool, sports facilities, café, conference rooms, and multipurpose facilities. The student union and student activities center are also housed in this complex.
- Research Complex- Completed in 2016 and operational from 2017, is equipped with student dormitories and features a multimedia production center that accommodates 202 to 232 people and offers rental services.

== Academic Reputation ==
=== University rankings ===
University rankings

Global – Overall
- QS World: 1001-1200（2027）

Regional – Overall
- QS Asia: 360（2026）

Hong Kong Shue Yan University (HKSYU) was ranked 1001–1200th worldwide by the QS World University Rankings 2027. The QS Asia University Rankings 2026 placed HKSYU at 360th in the region.

== Programmes ==
=== Bachelor of Arts with Honours ===
- Journalism and Mass Communication
- Chinese Language and Literature
- English Language and Literature
- Media Design and Immersive Technology
- History
- Economics & Finance

=== Bachelor of Social Sciences with Honours ===
- Counselling & Psychology
- Psychology
- Sociology
- Arts, Technology and Culture (ACT)

=== Bachelor of Science with Honours ===
- Applied Data Science
- Economics (collaborated with University of Leicester, U.K.)

=== Bachelor of Commerce with Honours ===
- Financial Technology
- Accounting (Professional Recognition: HKICPA, United Kingdom's ACCA, CIMA, AIA, Canadian CMA, CGA)
- Law & Business

=== Bachelor of Business Administration with Honours ===
- General (BBA with Hons)
- Human Resources Management - Applied Psychology
- Digital Marketing
- Corporate Governance and Risk Management

=== Bachelor of Social Work ===
- The Bachelor of Social Work (BSW) program is accredited and recognized by the Social Work Registration Board (SWRB) in Hong Kong. Upon graduation, our BSW graduates would be eligible to apply for the Registered Social Worker (RSW) status with the SWRB.

=== Master of Social Sciences ===
- Counselling Psychology
- Psychology
- Play Therapy

=== Master of Science ===
- Marketing and Consumer Psychology

=== MPhil/PhD Programmes ===
- in Chinese, English, History, Sociology, Economics and Psychology

== Faculties ==
Academic Departments at SYU are grouped in faculties

=== Faculty of Commerce ===
- Department of Accounting
- Department of Business Administration
- Department of Economics and Finance
- Department of Law and Business

=== Faculty of Arts ===
- Department of Journalism and Communication
- Department of Chinese Language & Literature
- Department of English Language & Literature
- Department of History

=== Faculty of Social Sciences ===
- Department of Counselling and Psychology
- Department of Social Work
- Department of Sociology
- Department of Applied Data Science

== Partnerships ==
Hong Kong Shue Yan University has partnerships with universities in the UK and Australia. The universities are University of Stirling, University of Wollongong, and University of Leicester. Split-degree programmes are offered, where the first two years are spent at SYU and the latter two in the overseas universities.

In 2013, the university also entered into collaboration with Birkbeck, University of London. The Trans-jurisdictional Legal Theory and Policy Research Centre enables scholars from both participating universities to develop comparative research projects and visit each other's institutions to teach. Up to 15 students per year from Shue Yan University are admitted onto the Qualifying Law Programme (LLM) at Birkbeck.

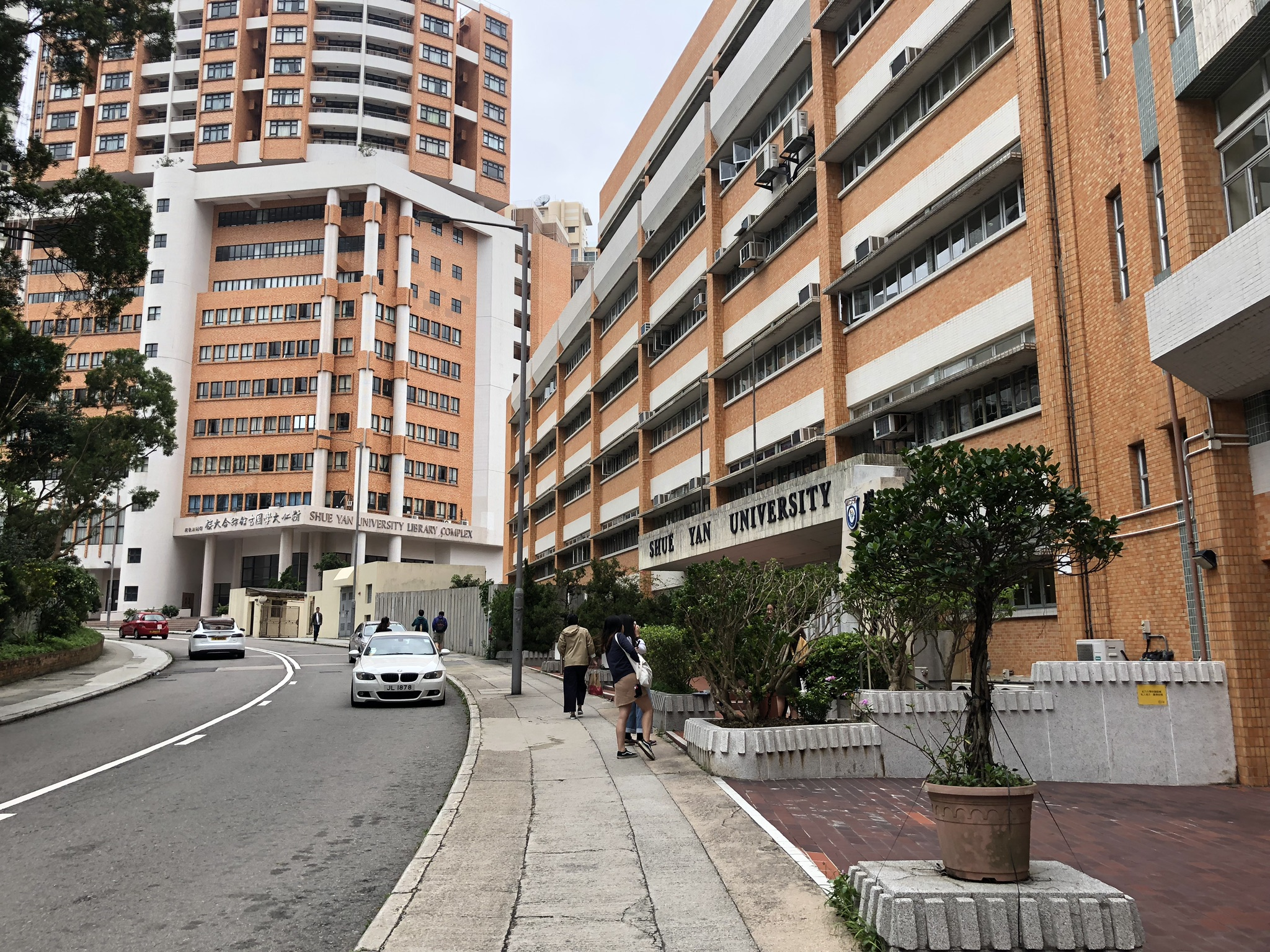
Hong Kong Shue Yan University

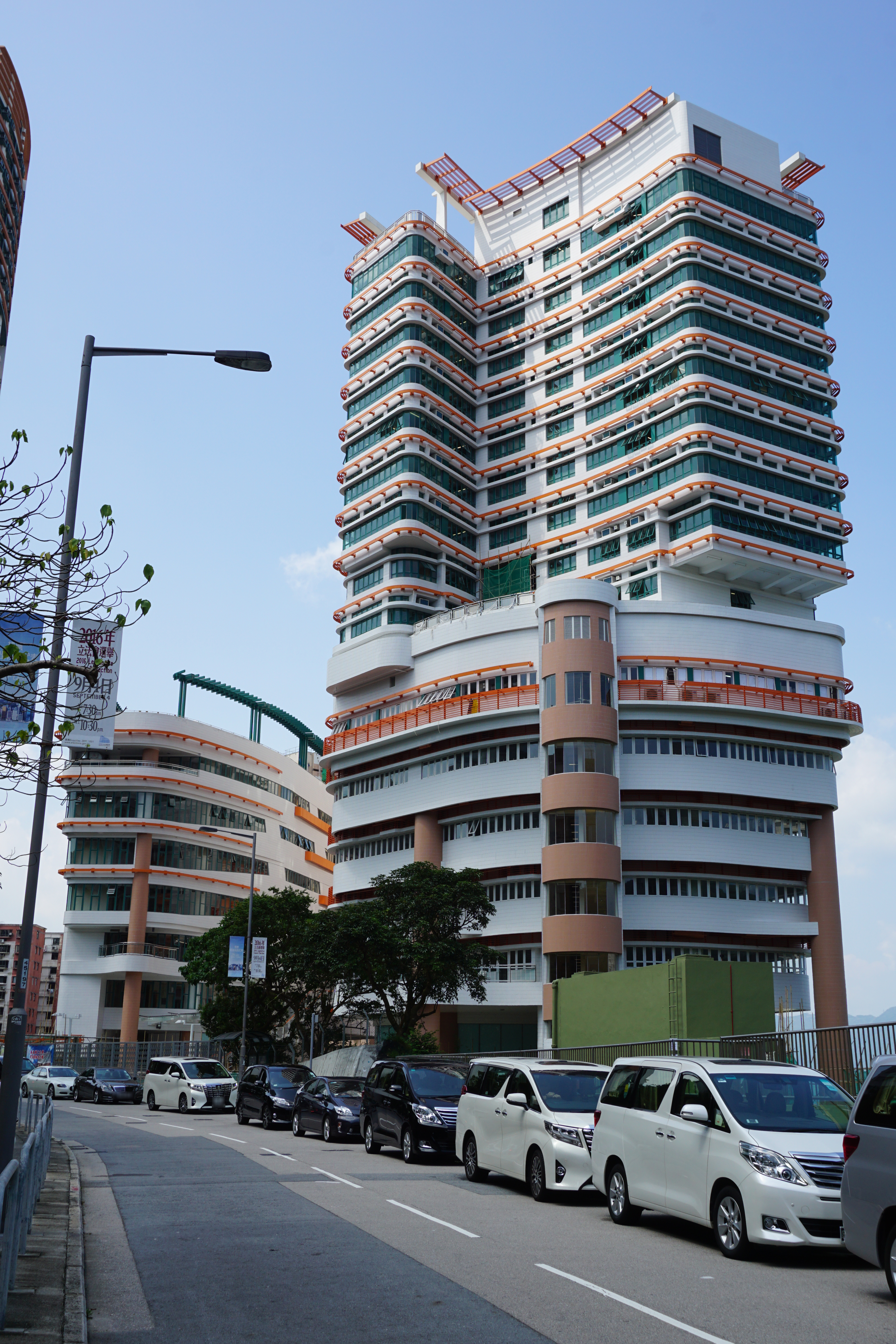
Graduate school complex

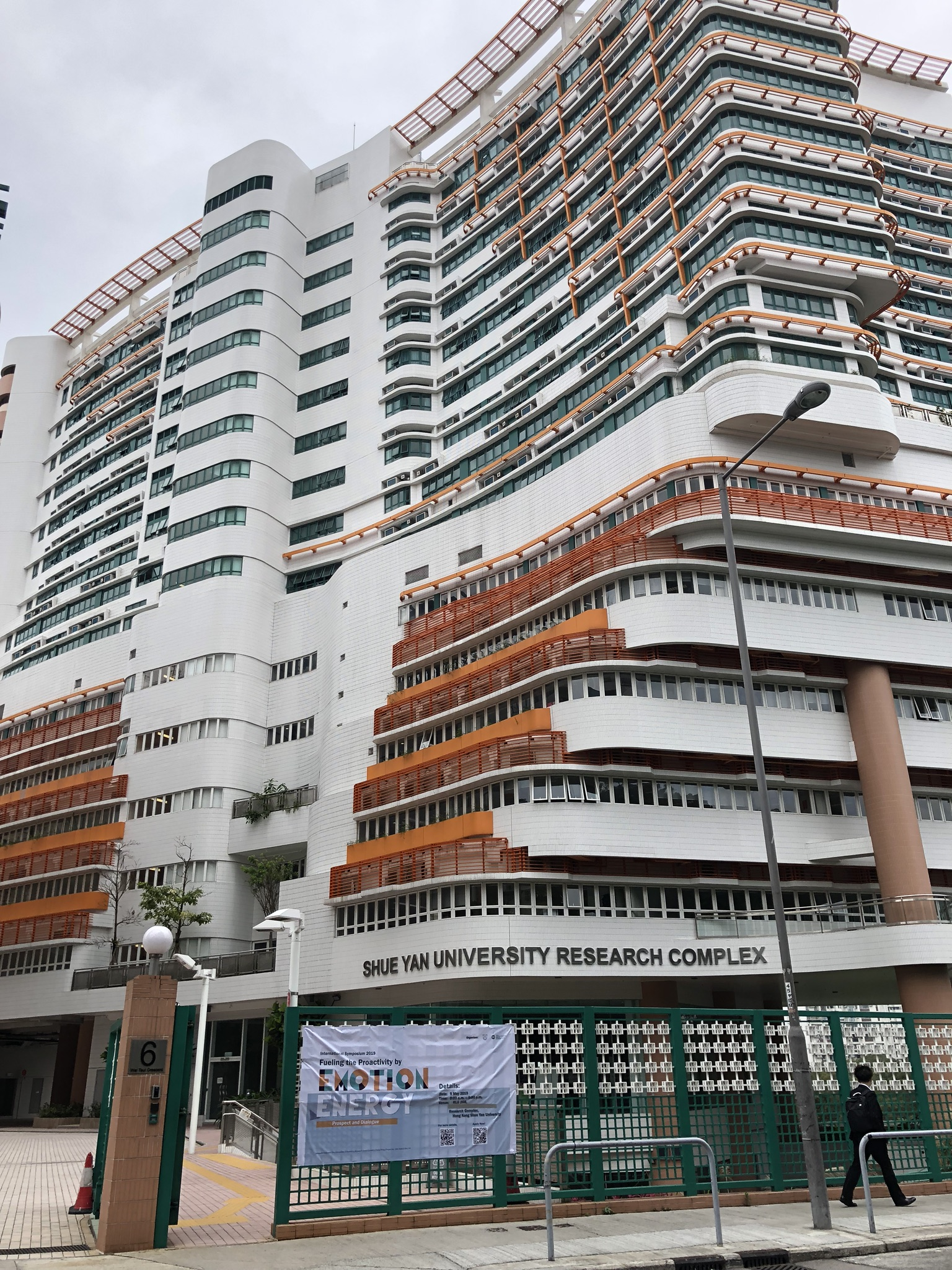
Research complex

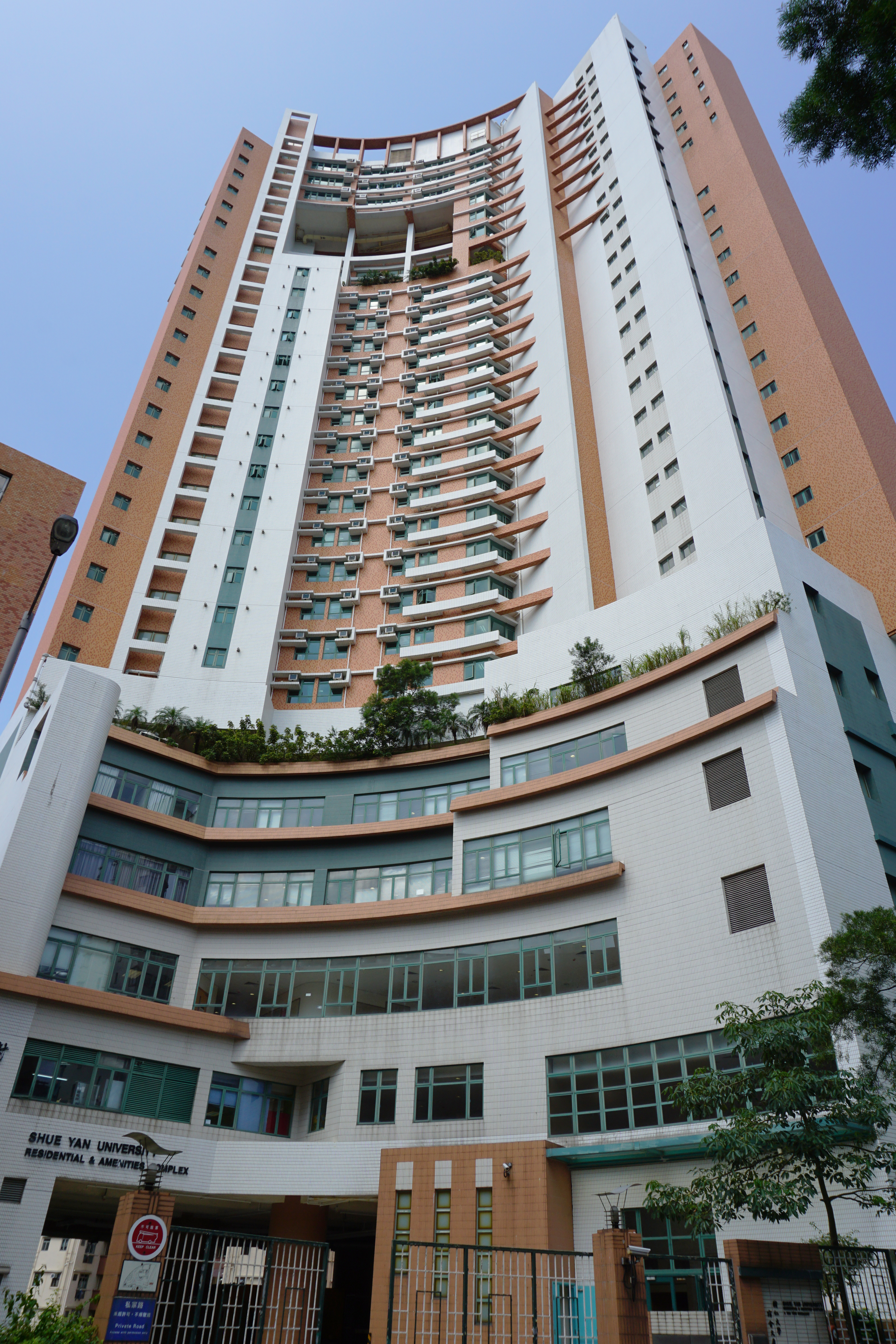
Residential complex

== See also ==
- Category:Alumni of Queen's College, Hong Kong
- List of universities in Hong Kong
