= Hong Kong Nang Yan College of Higher Education =

- 香港能仁專上學院
- Former name: Hong Kong Buddhist College
- Type: Private higher education
- Established: January 1969; 57 years ago
- Religious affiliation: Buddhist
- President: Prof. WONG, King Por Edwin
- Location: 22.3287°N 114.1601°E
- Campus: 325-329 Lai Chi Kok Road, Sham Shui Po, Kowloon, Hong Kong 176-178 Yee Kuk Street, Sham Shui Po, Kowloon, Hong Kong
- Website: Official website

Hong Kong Nang Yan College of Higher Education
- Traditional Chinese: 香港能仁專上學院
Transcriptions
Yue: Cantonese
- Yale Romanization: Hēung góng nàhng yàhn jyūn seuhng hohk yuhn
- Jyutping: Hoeng^{1} gong^{2} nang^{4} jan^{4} zyun^{1} soeng^{6} hok^{6} jyun^{6*2}

The Hong Kong Nang Yan College of Higher Education (HKNYC) is a private higher education provider in Sham Shui Po, Kowloon, Hong Kong.

The college was founded in 1969 as the Hong Kong Buddhist College, and changed its name in 2014 when it was granted accreditation from the Hong Kong Council for Accreditation of Academic and Vocational Qualifications for its associate degree programmes. The college is a registered nonprofit organisation.

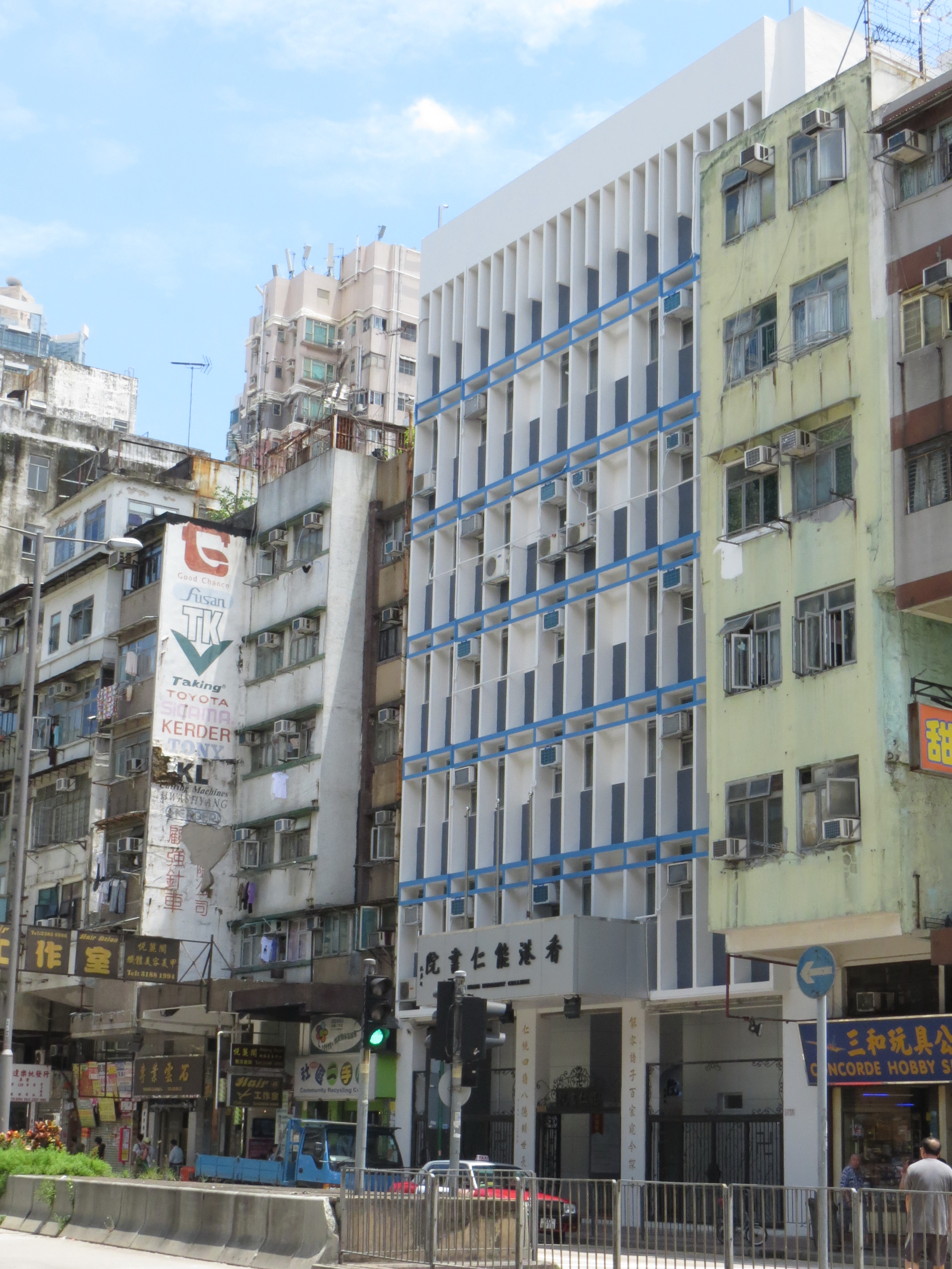
Hong Kong Buddhist College, Sham Shui Po, Kowloon, Hong Kong (the white building with blue stripes

In 2014 the Education Bureau, and the Chief Executive approved the application by the college to use the moniker Hok Yuen (學院) as part of its official name. The NYC features are small class size and scholarships and bursaries are provided to students. All NYC programmes have been accredited by the Hong Kong Council for Accreditation of Academic and Vocational Qualifications (HKCAAVQ). In the next few years, NYC will offer more bachelor's degree Programmes to the Hong Kong community, covering fields such as Human Resources Management, Banking and Financial Services, Social Work and Applied Psychology. A Master in Buddhist Studies programme is also part of this plan.

NYC owns two campuses. The campuses house Lecture Theatres, an Exhibition Hall, Classrooms, Computer Laboratories, a Music Room, a Dance Room, a Student Common Room, a Fitness Room, a Table Tennis Room, a Student Activities Room as well as a Sky Garden. The Library has around 200,000 items, among which 170,000 are electronic books. Equipped with 200M internet and Web 2.0 technology.

Overseas and/or local workplace experience will be arranged for students. Running for 4 to 8 weeks, it will take place in the summer. The college subsidizes students who participate in the overseas internship programmes.

== Programmes ==
The college currently offers both award-bearing and non-award-bearing programmes, including:

- Accredited bachelor's degree Programmes at QF Level 5
  - Bachelor of Arts (Honours) in Chinese (BAC)
  - Bachelor of Arts (Honours) in English for Professional and Intercultural Communication (BA-EPIC)
  - Bachelor of Business Administration (Honours) in Accounting (BBA-A)
  - Bachelor of Business Administration (Honours) in Marketing (BBA-M)
  - Bachelor of Social Work (Honours) (BSW)
- Accredited associate degree Programmes at QF Level 4
  - Associate in Business Administration (ABA)
  - Associate in Chinese (AC)
- Accredited Diploma Programme at QF Level 3
  - Diploma in Foundation Studies for Higher Education (DFS)
