= Saint Francis University, Hong Kong =

Private university in New Territories, Hong Kong

Coordinates: 22.3030°N 114.2506°E

Saint Francis University
- 聖方濟各大學
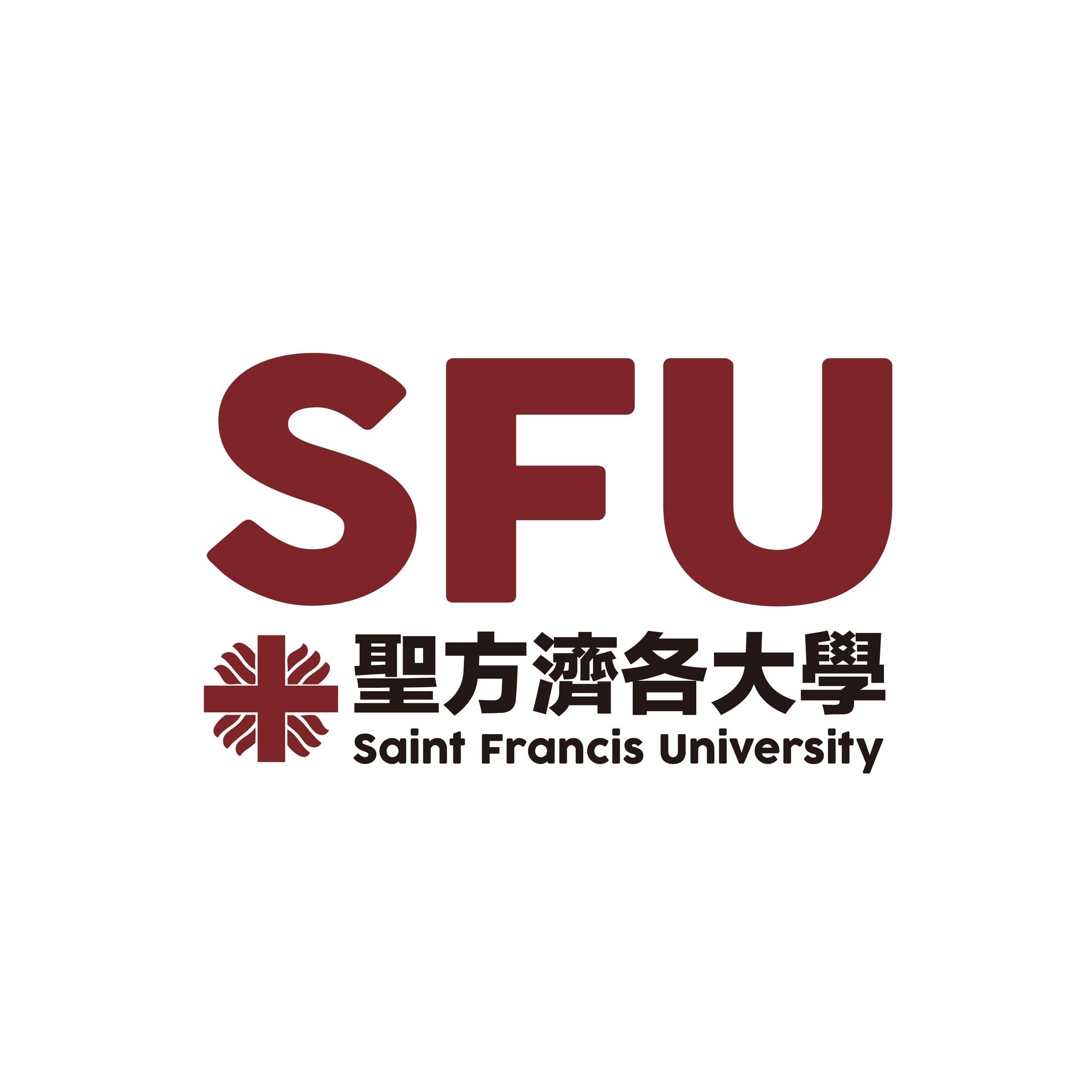
- Motto: AD Destinatum Prosequor
- Type: University; Private
- Established: 1985
- Affiliations: Alliance of Universities of Applied Sciences
- President: Professor Stephen Cheung Yan-leung
- Location: Hong Kong
- Website: sfu.edu.hk

Chinese name
- Traditional Chinese: 聖方濟各大學
Transcriptions
Yue: Cantonese
- Yale Romanization: Sing fōng jai gok daaih hohk
- Jyutping: Sing3 fong1 zai3 gok3 daai6 hok6

Caritas Institute of Higher Education
- Traditional Chinese: 明愛專上學院
- Simplified Chinese: 明爱专上学院
Transcriptions
Standard Mandarin
- Hanyu Pinyin: Míngài Zhuān Shàng Xuéyuàn
Yue: Cantonese
- Yale Romanization: Mìhngoi jyūnseuhng hohkyuhn
- Jyutping: Ming4 oi3 zyun1 soeng6 hok6 jyun6

Caritas Francis Hsu College
- Traditional Chinese: 明愛徐誠斌學院
- Simplified Chinese: 明爱徐诚斌学院
Transcriptions
Standard Mandarin
- Hanyu Pinyin: Míngài Xú Chéngbīn Xuéyuàn
Yue: Cantonese
- Yale Romanization: Mìhngoi chèuih sìhng bān hohkyuhn
- Jyutping: Ming4 oi3 ceoi4 sing4 ban1 hok6 jyun6

Saint Francis University (SFU, formerly Caritas Institute of Higher Education from 2011 to January 2024) is a private university in Tseung Kwan O, New Territories, Hong Kong.

The institute was established by Caritas Hong Kong in 1985, and is able to award bachelor's degrees or below. It was initially named after Francis Hsu, the Bishop of Hong Kong between 1969 and 1973. Until May 2011, the college was granted the degree-conferring status and it was renamed as Caritas Institute of Higher Education as an institution for its academic awards up to bachelor's degree level. On 9 January 2024, the Executive Council of Hong Kong approved the institute becoming Saint Francis University, making it the first Catholic university in Hong Kong. The university now offers master's and postgraduate programs.

== See also ==
- List of universities in Hong Kong
- Caritas Hong Kong
