= Economic and public affairs =

- Traditional Chinese: 經濟與公共事務科
Transcriptions
Yue: Cantonese
- Yale Romanization: Gīng jai yúh gūng guhng sih mouh fō
- Jyutping: Ging1 zai3 jyu5 gung1 gung6 si6 mou6 fo1

Economic and Public Affairs (EPA) is a subject taught in the junior forms of most secondary schools in Hong Kong, either as a separate subject or as a component of combined humanities or combined social studies. The subject is concerned with helping students to develop a basic understanding of economic and political issues, of the economic and political foundations of Hong Kong society, and of their responsibilities and rights as citizens and consumers. In many ways, it is similar to Civics courses which are taught in many other countries, but the syllabus content is almost entirely related to local Hong Kong topics.

== Topics ==
Topics covered in the EPA syllabus include the following:

Form One:

- Rights and duties of Hong Kong residents
- The status and immigration rights of Chinese and Non-Chinese, permanent and non-permanent residents
- The Demographics of Hong Kong
- Transportation in Hong Kong

Form Two:

- The Basic Law of Hong Kong and the concept of One Country Two Systems. Hong Kong's autonomy and the Chinese Government's sovereignty.
- The structure of the Hong Kong Government
- Law and Order in Hong Kong
- Hong Kong's Legal System and Judiciary
- Education in Hong Kong

Form Three:

- Consumer education
- The development and features of the economy of Hong Kong
- Hong Kong as a trade and finance centre
- Visible and invisible trade
- Problems faced by industry and their effect upon employment in Hong Kong
- The government's role in the economy
- Function and responsibilities of mass media

== Options after completing EPA ==
After studying EPA in Forms One to Three, students who wish to continue exploring the themes covered by the subject can opt to study Economics and Public Affairs and Government and Public Affairs for their HKCEE and HKALE examinations, and to complete the Liberal studies later in Forms Four to Six for the HKDSE (Some secondary school start it earlier - At Form One or Form Two.)
