= Hong Kong Higher Level Examination =

Former university entrance examination in Hong Kong

The Hong Kong Higher Level Examination (HKHLE; Chinese: 香港高等程度會考) was a public examination taken by students in Hong Kong. It was taken at the end of Form 6 (Lower Sixth), in preparation for entry to The Chinese University of Hong Kong (CUHK), which then offered four-year courses. It differed from the Hong Kong Advanced Level Examination taken by Form 7 (Upper Sixth) students and was usually taken by students from Chinese-as-Medium-of-Instruction secondary schools. It was abolished in 1993 when CUHK changed the length of its courses to three years, in line with the University of Hong Kong, after the introduction of the Joint University Programmes Admissions System in 1992.

== History ==
In 1979, The Chinese University of Hong Kong (CUHK) set up the HKHLE for secondary school students who were interested in attending the university. Since the Hong Kong Examinations Authority also organised the Hong Kong Advanced Level Examination (HKALE) at the time, this meant that two different secondary school leaving qualifications were offered simultaneously.

In 1980, 21,407 students sat the HKALE while only 12,164 students sat the HKHLE. However, CUHK launched the "Form Six Provisional Acceptance" system, and the two-year matriculation admitted to CUHK became the other main way for the student. Because of so many disadvantages, the number of students sitting the HKHLE decreased.

As having two public examinations caused confusion, in 1982 the Hong Kong Education adviser proposed to the government abolition of the HKHLE. A report published by the Education Commission in 1986 also proposed to repeal the HKHLE.

In the late 1980s, the Government of Hong Kong wanted to improve the university system in Hong Kong. The duration of degree courses offered by CUHK was then gradually shortened from four to three years. In 1992, the government launched the Joint University Programmes Admissions System (JUPAS), which only accepted the HKALE. Therefore, the HKHLE was discontinued and was last held in 1992.

== Subjects offered ==
Chinese subjects:

- Chinese Language and Literature
- Chinese history

English subjects:

- English

Chinese or English subjects:

- Biology
- Chemistry
- Physics
- General Mathematics
- Higher Mathematics
- Government and Public Affairs (replaced Economic and Public Affairs since 1987)
- Economic opening (1980)
- Geography
- History
- Art
- Music
- Religion (opened in 1981)
- Principles of Accounts opened (1982)
- Business Studies (opened in 1982)

== See also ==
- Hong Kong Advanced Level Examination
- Hong Kong Certificate of Education Examination
- Education in Hong Kong
