= JUPAS =

Hong Kong degree application system

Joint University Programmes Admissions System
- Abbreviation: JUPAS
- Formation: 1990
- Purpose: Higher-education application processing
- Location: The University of Hong Kong, Pokfulam, Hong Kong
- Region served: Hong Kong
- Main organ: JUPAS Board of Management
- Website: www.jupas.edu.hk

JUPAS
- Traditional Chinese: 大學聯合招生辦法
- Simplified Chinese: 大学联合招生办法
Transcriptions
Standard Mandarin
- Hanyu Pinyin: Dàxué Liánhé Zhāoshēng Bànfǎ
Yue: Cantonese
- Jyutping: daai6 hok6 lyun4 hap6 ziu1 saang1 baan6 faat3

JUPAS
- Traditional Chinese: 聯招
- Simplified Chinese: 联招
Transcriptions
Standard Mandarin
- Hanyu Pinyin: Liánzhāo
Yue: Cantonese
- Jyutping: lyun4 ziu1

The Joint University Programmes Admissions System (Chinese: 大學聯合招生辦法), commonly known as JUPAS (聯招), is a centralised admissions system for full-time undergraduate programmes in Hong Kong. As of the 2025 admission cycle, JUPAS covers all government-funded degrees and sub-degree programmes offered by institutions under the University Grants Committee (UGC), as well as most other full-time degree programmes provided by higher education institutions in Hong Kong.

== History ==
Before the introduction of the Joint University Programmes Admissions System (JUPAS) in 1990, tertiary education institutions in Hong Kong had independent admission processes, and students had to take one of two separate entrance examinations. The Hong Kong Advanced Level Examination (HKALE), designed for a three-year tertiary education curriculum, was primarily used by the University of Hong Kong (HKU). Meanwhile, the Hong Kong Higher Level Examination (HKHLE), designed for a four-year tertiary education curriculum, was mainly used by The Chinese University of Hong Kong (CUHK).

To reduce students' pressure from managing two different examinations and admission procedures, the University Grants Committee (UGC) established JUPAS to centralise the admissions processes of five institutions: HKU, CUHK, City Polytechnic of Hong Kong, The Hong Kong Polytechnic Institute, and Hong Kong Baptist College. The UGC also designated the HKALE as the standardised benchmark examination, leading to the discontinuation of the HKHLE in 1992, two years after JUPAS was introduced.

Institutions established after JUPAS was launched and directly under the UGC, including the Hong Kong University of Science and Technology (HKUST), The Hong Kong Institute of Education (now The Education University of Hong Kong), and Lingnan University, joined the scheme in 1991, 1996, and 1999, respectively.

As an alternative for students who wished to pursue undergraduate education but faced challenges due to JUPAS's high competitiveness, all government-funded sub-degree programmes offered by JUPAS member institutions were incorporated into the system from the 2000 admission cycle.

In the 2006 admission cycle, the Open University of Hong Kong (now Hong Kong Metropolitan University), which offered self-financed degree programmes, also joined JUPAS. The Hong Kong Shue Yan University was invited to participate but declined, opting to maintain an independent admissions process.

As part of Hong Kong's education reform, the HKALE was phased out in 2012, though retakes were allowed in 2013. It was replaced by the Hong Kong Diploma of Secondary Education (HKDSE), which became the new standard university entrance examination. The UGC continued to adopt JUPAS as the admissions system for its member institutions, and in the 2011 admission cycle, JUPAS began accepting applications from students taking the HKDSE.

== Benchmark examinations ==
Because JUPAS is a system rather than an entrance examination or an admissions process, it collects students' academic results for reference by admissions personnel in member institutions. In theory, all recognised international academic examinations are considered for admission into JUPAS, although the Hong Kong Advanced Level Examination (HKALE) and/or the Hong Kong Diploma of Secondary Education (HKDSE, launched in the academic year 2011) are mandatory for every student. Applicants must submit a valid HKALE or HKDSE result obtained in the same or preceding year in which they apply for JUPAS. These examination results are generally regarded as the most important factor for admission to nearly all programmes, except under the now-defunct Early Admissions Scheme.

Before the introduction of the HKDSE, the Hong Kong Certificate of Education Examination (HKCEE) was taken by almost every student, as nearly all candidates who sat for the HKALE also took the HKCEE. HKCEE results were typically considered an important factor in admissions and were usually required. In addition to the aforementioned examinations, two international English benchmark examinations—the TOEFL and the IELTS—play a significant role in certain circumstances, including serving as a minimum admission requirement; however, in most cases, they are not essential.

== Participating institutes and courses ==
During the 2016/17 academic year, the following programmes were offered under JUPAS:

1. Government-funded full-time degree and sub-degree programmes (sub-degree programmes are indicated with an asterisk (*)). These are offered by University Grants Committee (UGC)-funded institutions:
  - City University of Hong Kong (*)
  - Hong Kong Baptist University
  - Lingnan University
  - The Chinese University of Hong Kong
  - The Education University of Hong Kong (*)
  - The Hong Kong Polytechnic University (*)
  - The Hong Kong University of Science and Technology
  - The University of Hong Kong
2. Selected self-financed full-time degree programmes offered by Hong Kong Metropolitan University
3. Study Subsidy Scheme for Designated Professions (SSSDP) degree programmes offered by:
  - Saint Francis University
  - Chu Hai College of Higher Education
  - Hang Seng University of Hong Kong
  - Tung Wah College
  - Hong Kong Metropolitan University
  - Hong Kong Institute of Vocational Education (including Technological and Higher Education Institute of Hong Kong)

Applicants under JUPAS are not permitted to apply directly to member institutions for any undergraduate programme that is available through the system. In such cases, JUPAS applications take priority, and any direct applications are automatically voided. However, this restriction does not apply to programmes that are not offered through JUPAS.

Programmes provided by institutions that are not associated with JUPAS (for example, Hong Kong Shue Yan University or community colleges affiliated with UGC-funded institutions) are managed independently, and applicants must apply directly to the relevant institution.

Non-Form 6 students who are not currently enrolled in JUPAS-provided degree programmes, including those studying in JUPAS non-degree programmes, may apply provided they have met the HKDSE requirement or will participate in the HKDSE in the same academic year to meet the requirement. Students in secondary schools approved by the Education Bureau are eligible to apply for the above programmes only through JUPAS.

== Application process ==
Applicants through JUPAS can select up to 20 programme choices offered by the nine local institutes via the online portal, provided they satisfy the prerequisites. The application form is subdivided into several bandings—namely, bands A, B, C, D, and E. Ranking choices in different bands affects the scoring process in JUPAS; thus, placing a programme higher in the priority list generally increases the chance of admission. Prior to the release of admission results, only the bandings, and not the specific order of choices, are disclosed to the educational institutions.

In 2011, the number of programme choices available to students sitting the HKDSE was reduced from 25 to 20. However, students may replace up to five of their choices after the release of their HKDSE results.

== Selection process ==
Every programme offered under JUPAS compiles a "Merit order list" of its applicants based on academic performance, interview performance, and extracurricular activities. The "Merit order list" and the applicants' rank list are then entered into a match-making process that uses an elimination method, ensuring that each applicant is allocated to the programme they most prefer and for which they are qualified.

Most programmes consider only academic performance when creating the "Merit order list." In most cases, both HKALE and HKCEE results are taken into account. Although performance in the HKALE remains the most important admission factor, some universities weight HKCEE results more heavily—assigning them 40% or 50% of the overall academic performance—rather than the usual 0–20%. Due to the cancellation of fine grades in both the HKCEE and HKALE, the HKCEE becomes a crucial factor in determining admission for students whose scores are near the cutoff, as it is more challenging to differentiate performance with only five passing ranks per subject.

Furthermore, some programmes place greater emphasis on specific subjects. For instance, many commercial subjects double or even triple-count the HKALE Use of English and HKCEE English results when calculating admission scores.

The first-round admission results are traditionally released on the Wednesday preceding the week in which the HKCEE results are announced, and the entire admission process continues until late August—sometimes as late as one week before certain member institutions commence their first semester.

== Difficulty ==
Due to the high difficulty of the Hong Kong Advanced Level Examination (HKALE) and the fixed quota of university places in recent years, JUPAS has been regarded as one of the most competitive university application schemes in the world. Media and scholars have claimed that it is second only to China's National Higher Education Entrance Examination. More than 30% of applicants meeting the minimum Degree Programme requirement have not received an offer for any degree-level programme through JUPAS.

The admission rate dropped dramatically in the 2012 intake. Under the 334 Scheme, most secondary school students become eligible to sit for the Hong Kong Diploma of Secondary Education (HKDSE)—and therefore apply for JUPAS—which has led to a substantial increase in the number of applicants. (Not every student is eligible to apply for the HKALE due to HKCEE requirements for non-mature candidates.)

In comparison with direct entry from sub-degree programmes, JUPAS has a significantly higher entrance rate. As the system is open to students who are not already enrolled in full-time programmes under JUPAS, some sub-degree students have opted to retake certain subjects to improve their chances of gaining admission to government-funded degree programmes.

The table below compares the number of school candidates achieving the minimum Degree Programme requirement with the number of JUPAS Degree Programme intakes. The actual percentages may vary slightly due to the admission of non-school HKALE/HKDSE candidates, candidates who did not accept their Main Round offer following a successful HKALE appeal (resulting in a better offer), or candidates who declined their offer.

Intakes from HKALE and HKCEE (2003–2012)

Intake Year	School Candidates Achieved minimum entrance requirement	JUPAS Degree Intake from Main Round Offer	Deduced percentage for eligible students received offer
2012	18,212	12,289	67.5%
2011	18,347	12,417	67.7%
2010	17,261	12,244	72.1%
2009	17,130	12,038	70.2%
2008	16,992	11,979	70.5%
2007	16,520	11,525	69.8%
2006	15,581	11,294	72.5%
2005	15,557	11,469	73.7%
2004	16,308	11,748	72.0%
2003	16,222	12,273	75.6%

Note:

1. In the tables above, "requirement" and "offer" refer to degree-level programmes (including OUHK self-financed programmes from the 2006 intake) and their respective admission criteria, reflecting the differences between degree and sub-degree programme requirements.
2. The data does not include Early Admission Scheme intakes or sub-degree offers.

Intakes from HKDSE (2012–Present)

Intake Year	Total no. of applicants	JUPAS Degree Intake from Main Round Offer	Percentage of applicants who received Main Round offers
2023	39,948	16,149	40.43%
2022	39,523	15,857	40.12%
2021	40,658	20,035	49.28%
2020	41,664	19,995	48.00%
2019	44,413	20,208	45.50%
2018	46,703	20,119	43.08%
2017	48,502	21,165	43.64%
2016	53,781	22,164	41.21%
2015	58,293	21,297	36.14%
2014	63,915	19,657	30.75%
2013	69,397	18,239	26.28%
2012	64,442	16,619	25.79%

== Sub-systems ==
In addition to the main selection scheme, JUPAS offers several additional sub-systems and schemes for candidates who may not excel academically but have demonstrated strengths or specific needs in other areas.

=== Sub-system for applicants with a disability ===
Applicants with any of the following disabilities may apply through this sub-system:

- Physical handicapped
- Hearing impairment
- Visual impairment
- Visceral disability
- Speech impairment
- Autism
- Mental illness

This sub-system aims to inform applicants at an early stage of the special assistance and facilities that institutions can provide upon admission. Applicants may receive separate offers through this sub-system.

=== Sub-system for school principal's nominations ===
Each local secondary school principal may nominate up to three students from their school. Nominees must have outstanding achievements in non-academic areas, such as sports, music, social services, or other cultural activities, or have demonstrated leadership abilities. The goal of this scheme is to encourage students to excel in areas beyond academics during their secondary studies.

=== Self recommendation scheme ===
This scheme is designed for applicants with outstanding achievements in extracurricular activities. Applicants may apply for this scheme in addition to the main selection scheme and are permitted to submit a portfolio of extracurricular activities to the institutions to which they apply. This allows institutions to consider the applicants' accomplishments in non-academic areas alongside their academic performance. The aim of the scheme is to encourage broader participation in extracurricular activities during secondary education.

== Early Admissions Scheme ==
The Early Admissions Scheme, a subsystem of JUPAS, was implemented from the 2002/03 to the 2010/11 academic years. It was designed specifically for Secondary 6 students who achieved outstanding results in the HKCEE, enabling them to bypass the HKALE and gain direct admission to the University of Hong Kong, The Chinese University of Hong Kong, or the Hong Kong University of Science and Technology upon meeting certain HKCEE benchmarks. Approximately 3–5% of total JUPAS intakes participated in this scheme until it was abolished in the 2011/12 academic year.

== See also ==
- Early Admissions Scheme
- Education in Hong Kong
- Higher education in Hong Kong
- Hong Kong Advanced Level Examination
- Hong Kong Certificate of Education Examination
- UCAS
- Matriculation
