= Hong Kong Examinations and Assessment Authority =

Statutory body in Hong Kong

- 香港考試及評核局

Agency overview
- Formed: 5 May 1977; 49 years ago
- Jurisdiction: Hong Kong Government
- Status: Statutory body
- Headquarters: 12-14/F, Southorn Centre, 130 Hennessy Road, Wan Chai
- Agency executives: Samuel Yung, Chairman; Wei Xiangdong, Secretary General
- Website: hkeaa.edu.hk

Hong Kong Examinations and Assessment Authority
- Traditional Chinese: 香港考試及評核局
- Simplified Chinese: 香港考试及评核局
Transcriptions
Standard Mandarin
- Hanyu Pinyin: Xiānggǎng Kǎoshì jí Pínghé Jú
Yue: Cantonese
- Yale Romanization: Hēung góng háau síh kahp pìhng haht guhk
- Jyutping: Hoeng1 gong2 haau2 si5 kap6 ping4 hat6 guk6

Hong Kong Examinations Authority
- Traditional Chinese: 香港考試局
- Simplified Chinese: 香港考試局
Transcriptions
Standard Mandarin
- Hanyu Pinyin: Xiānggǎng Kǎoshì Jú
Yue: Cantonese
- Yale Romanization: Hēung góng háau síh guhk
- Jyutping: Hoeng1 gong2 haau2 si5 guk6

The Hong Kong Examinations and Assessment Authority (HKEAA), previously known as the Hong Kong Examinations Authority (HKEA) before 2002, is a statutory body of the Hong Kong Government responsible for the administration of public examinations and related assessments. The authority is Hong Kong's only public examination board.

Currently HKEAA administers the Hong Kong Diploma of Secondary Education Examination (HKDSE) since 2012; in the past, it was responsible for the Hong Kong Certificate of Education Examination (HKCEE) (discontinued since 2012) and the Hong Kong Advanced Level Examination (HKALE) (discontinued since 2014).

== History ==
The Authority was established on 5 May 1977. The Authority commenced to be the provider of Hong Kong Higher Level Examination and Hong Kong Advanced Level Examination (HKALE) in 1979 and 1980 respectively. It was put in charge of the HKCEE the following year, becoming the only administrator of public examinations in Hong Kong.

== The Authority Council ==
The Authority Council comprises 17 members selected from the school sector, tertiary institutions, government bodies and persons experienced in commerce, industry or a profession in Hong Kong. Aside from the ex officio affiliates, all members are allotted by the chief executive of the Hong Kong SAR Government. The governing council is accountable for devising examination policies and scrutinising the operation of the Authority.

== Employment ==
The Authority employs a permanent Secretariat of in the region of 340 staff members to overhaul its boards and committees and to formulate all the essential engagements for the running of the examinations for which the Authority is in charge. The Secretariat is the decision-making division of the Authority.

== Administration structure ==
The Hong Kong Examinations and Assessment Authority is backed up by a number of committees in its management of the examinations in Hong Kong, as follows:

- The Authority Council
  - Finance and General
    - Purposes Committee Language Proficiency Assessment for Teachers Main Committee
    - Basic Competency Assessments Main Committee
  - School Examinations Board Research Committee
    - Grading Committee
    - Subject Committees
    - Committee on Processing of Applications from Candidates with Disabilities

== Examination services ==
The International and Professional Examinations Division of HKEAA (IPED) accepts and administers entries from private candidates for over 200 examinations. For example, the HKEAA administers IGCSE examinations from University of Cambridge International Examinations and Edexcel boards. The HKEAA imports some languages examinations from Cambridge into the HKCEE and will continue to do so after the introduction of the Hong Kong Diploma of Secondary Education (HKDSE).

== Controversies ==
There are numerous controversies, particularly after 2004, raised regarding the questions on Hong Kong Certificate of Education Examination.

=== Controversy of the history paper of 2020 HKDSE ===
On 14 May 2020, candidates were asked whether they agreed with the statement 'Japan did more good than harm to China in the period of 1900–45.' in the history exam of HKDSE. Education Bureau later requested HKEAA to scrap the question, claiming it 'leading and biased.' State media such as Ta Kung Pao, Wen Wei Po and Global Times slammed the staffers of HKEAA unfit for setting examination questions. The incident led to candidates to avoid elective questions on China in the 2021 examination.
