= Education in Hong Kong =

Education Bureau Social Welfare Department
- Secretary for Education Director of Social Welfare: Christine Choi Edward To

National education budget (2012/13)
- Budget: HK$110.526 billion (HK$39,420 per capita)

General details
- Primary languages: English, Cantonese
- System type: National
- 12-year Compulsory Education: September 2019

Literacy (2016)
- Total: 94.6%
- Male: 98.33%
- Female: 94.92%

Enrollment (2018/19)
- Total: 1,045,000
- Primary: 376,300
- Secondary: 344,600
- Post secondary: 324,100

Attainment
- Secondary diploma: 49%
- Post-secondary diploma: 33.1%

Education in Hong Kong used to be largely modelled on that of the United Kingdom, particularly the English system. Since 2012, the overhaul of secondary school diploma has introduced changes to the number of school years as well as the two-tier general examinations. The DSE has replaced the old HKCEE (similar to the UK's GCSE) and the A-levels. Education policy in Hong Kong is overseen by the Education Bureau and the Social Welfare Department.

The academic year begins mid-year, usually starting in September.

== History ==
Small village Chinese schools were observed by the British missionaries when they arrived c. 1843. Anthony Sweeting believes those small village schools existed in Chek Chue (modern-day town of Stanley), Shek Pai Wan, Heung Kong Tsai (modern-day Aberdeen) and Wong Nai Chong on Hong Kong Island, although proof is no longer available.

One of the earliest schools with reliable records was Li Ying College established in 1075 in present-day New Territories. By 1860 Hong Kong had 20 village schools. Chinese who were wealthy did not educate their children in Hong Kong but instead sent them to major Chinese cities, such as Canton, for traditional Chinese education.

The changes came with the arrival of the British in 1841. At first, Hong Kong's education came from Protestant and Catholic missionaries who provided social services. Italian missionaries began to provide boy-only education to British and Chinese youth in 1843.

In 1862 Frederick Stewart arrived in Hong Kong. His work, over a period of years, led to him being called, "The Founder of Hong Kong Education". He took up an appointment as the first headmaster of the first school to be founded and fully-funded by the Hong Kong Government, Queen's College (then named the Hong Kong Government Central School for Boys). He took a lead from various missionaries who had been active in Hong Kong education for the Chinese in the earlier post 1841 period and insisted on a bilingual and bicultural curriculum. (Half the day was spent on the Chinese language and the traditional Confucian curriculum and half the day was spent on the English language and what was then known as "useful knowledge" (i.e. western studies).

One of the much-contested debates was whether schools should offer vernacular education, teaching in Chinese. Education was considered a luxury for the elite and the rich. The first school to open the floodgate of western medical practice into East Asia was the Hong Kong College of Medicine for Chinese. The London Missionary Society and Sir James Cantlie started the Hong Kong College of Medicine for Chinese in 1887 (although, the 'for Chinese' was later dropped from the name). Also, the London Missionary Society founded Ying Wa Girls' School in 1900. From 1921 to 1941, St. Stephen's Girls College in Hong Kong provided a progressive science curriculum to help prepare career women for social service in China.

Belilios Public School was a girls' secondary school founded in 1890 – the first government school in Hong Kong that provided bilingual education in English and Chinese. The push for Chinese education in a British system did not begin until the rise of social awareness of the Chinese community following the 1919 May Fourth Movement and the 1934 New Life Movement in China. Educating the poor did not become a priority until they accounted for the majority of the population. Financial issues were addressed in the 1970s.

In 1997 Keith Richburg of The Washington Post wrote that in the British era education was based on education in the United Kingdom, "largely apolitical", and did not emphasise topics related to politics nor civic affairs. The governor of Hong Kong had the right to bar, under law, "the dissemination of information, or expression of opinion, of a clearly biased political nature in schools" but Richburg stated that "That law was rarely used". There were attempts to repeal said law prior to 1 July 1997. By 1991 the education authorities wanted to have history classes with a positive view of China to make the handover smoother but some teachers with liberal views sought to have more critical views.

In 1997, the Hong Kong Special Administrative Region implemented the Target Oriented Curriculum (TOC) to introduce and spread the project learning in the national primary schools. To promote the interactions of work groups or individual students in a new learning environment, professors were engaged in the role of "consultant, facilitator, helper" and posers of questions. Ten years after, the 80% of the Hong Kong's institutes had left the traditional approach to education, mainly based on teachers and textbooks, to adopt an active and experiential learning pedagogy.

The imposition of the Hong Kong national security law resulted in a decline in enrollment in traditionally prestigious Hong Kong schools, as many families with the financial means chose instead to send their children abroad. According to a survey conducted across 100 schools, between July and November, approximately 1,474 students left these schools. Around 50% of these students departed Hong Kong along with other family members. In January 2023, the release of data for the academic year 2021–2022 indicated a significant increase in the number of students who chose to leave Hong Kong universities before completing their degrees. This trend was accompanied by a notable rise in the departure of lecturers, reaching a level that had not been observed in over 20 years. In February 2023, reports highlighted that approximately 3,500 teachers in subsidised schools had left their positions during the previous academic year, with a majority opting to resign rather than retire. Between 2021 and 2022, a report showed that around 28,000 students had left Hong Kong's school system.

In 2020, it was observed that references to sensitive subjects had been excluded from the majority of new textbooks in Hong Kong. In subsequent years, the government implemented additional measures, including a requirement for foreign teachers working in Hong Kong to take an oath of allegiance. Notably, new middle school textbooks disputed Hong Kong's status as a former colony, presenting it as Chinese territory occupied by Britain. These textbooks also asserted that the recent protests in Hong Kong were instigated by foreign entities. The curriculum for liberal studies classes underwent a shift, with a renewed emphasis on patriotism and national security, including the establishment of National Security Education Day.

In 2022, the Education Bureau introduced the Citizenship and Social Development subject, to replace Liberal Studies as one of the four core subjects in senior secondary education. As part of the subject, students will participate in fully subsidised field trips to mainland China. The trips range from two to five days in duration, with destinations such as Guangzhou, Shenzhen, and Hunan. The itinerary for the two-day trips includes visits to the Memorial Museum of Sun Yat-sen's mansion and the former site of the Whampoa Military Academy in Guangzhou. Another two-day trip involves exploring the Deqing Palace, a historical site in Zhaoqing city, where students learn about the ancient imperial examination system and Confucianism.

In 2023, the Hong Kong University of Science and Technology and Education University of Hong Kong announced that they would allow the use of artificial intelligence-enabled tools and large language models such as ChatGPT in coursework. In a letter to staff, HKUST said the decision on whether or not to allow students to use AI tools would be left to individual teaching staff. EdUHK's vice president John Lee said “The emergence of AI technology has brought about tremendous change to conventional teaching. Teachers should be more proactive than ever in serving as facilitators to foster students’ understanding about the strengths and constraints of AI, while promoting the responsible use of technology".

In August 2023, officials from Hong Kong and Guangdong signed a framework agreement to strengthen education exchanges and cooperation between schools in the two regions. The agreement aimed to promote collaboration and exchanges in education, nurture talent for the development of the Greater Bay Area, and contribute to the development of both regions. It encourages higher education institutions to collaborate on education services, talent cultivation, and technology exchanges.

The agreement also focuses on enhancing cooperation in vocational education, promoting the establishment of sister schools, facilitating exchange activities, and improving the quality of such exchanges. The Vocational Training Council signed a memorandum of understanding with Guangdong to initiate collaborative projects and establish the GBA Vocational Education Park. The agreement also involves Guangdong supporting the VTC's mainland operation center and providing guidance for the GBA Explorer Trip program, which aims to enhance students' understanding of GBA developments.

== Pre-school education ==
Pre-school education in Hong Kong is not free, in principle, and fees are payable by pupils' parents. However, parents whose children have the right of abode in Hong Kong can pay for part of their fees with a voucher from the government under the Pre-primary Education Voucher Scheme (PEVS). In 2013, the amount of subsidy under the PEVS is $16,800.

== Primary and secondary education ==
Every child in Hong Kong is required by law to attend a primary school after the child has attained the age of 6. They are also required to attend a secondary school after primary education and is completed before he/she attains the age of 18. However, a student who has completed up to Form Three of secondary education is exempted. Education in the public sector is free. Public primary schools admit students via the Primary One Admission System.

=== School years ===
Average age in school year	Year	Curriculum Stages			Schools
3–4	Kindergarten 1	Preschool education			Kindergarten
4–5	Kindergarten 2	Preschool education			Kindergarten
5–6	Kindergarten 3	Preschool education			Kindergarten
6–7	Primary 1	Primary education	Primary level	P.1–P.3 (KS1)	Primary school
7–8	Primary 2	Primary education	Primary level	P.1–P.3 (KS1)	Primary school
8–9	Primary 3	Primary education	Primary level	P.1–P.3 (KS1)	Primary school
9–10	Primary 4	Primary education	Primary level	P.4–P.6 (KS2)	Primary school
10–11	Primary 5	Primary education	Primary level	P.4–P.6 (KS2)	Primary school
11–12	Primary 6	Primary education	Primary level	P.4–P.6 (KS2)	Primary school
12–13	Secondary 1	Secondary education	Junior secondary	S.1–S.3 (KS3)	Secondary school
13–14	Secondary 2	Secondary education	Junior secondary	S.1–S.3 (KS3)	Secondary school
14–15	Secondary 3	Secondary education	Junior secondary	S.1–S.3 (KS3)	Secondary school
15–16	Secondary 4	Diploma of Secondary Education (HKDSE)	Senior secondary	S.4–S.6 (KS4)	Secondary school
16–17	Secondary 5	Diploma of Secondary Education (HKDSE)	Senior secondary	S.4–S.6 (KS4)	Secondary school
17–18	Secondary 6	Diploma of Secondary Education (HKDSE)	Senior secondary	S.4–S.6 (KS4)	Secondary school
>18	University	Varies of further education			University

=== Secondary education ===
Secondary education is separated into junior and senior years. In junior years, the curriculum is a broad one where history, geography, science are studied alongside subjects that have already been studied at primary schools. In senior years, this becomes more selective and students have a choice over what and how much is to be studied. Almost all schools but PLK Vicwood KT Chong Sixth Form College and its feeder junior secondary college have both sessions.

Annually, Form Six students studying in local schools in Hong Kong sit for the Hong Kong Diploma of Secondary Education (HKDSE) between early March through early May. However, a minority of local secondary schools in Hong Kong also offer the International Baccalaureate Diploma Program (IBDP) for their students as an alternative choice to the HKDSE curriculum, for example, Diocesan Boys' School and St. Paul's Co-educational College.

=== Further education ===
The commerce stream in secondary schools is considered vocational. Students in the Commerce stream would usually enter the workplace to gain practical work experience by this point. Further education pursuits in the Hong Kong Institute of Vocational Education or universities abroad are common. The Manpower Development Committee (MDC) advises the government on coordination, regulation, and promotion of the sector. Also, the Vocational Training Council (VTC) ensures the level of standard is met through the "Apprentice Ordinance". The VTC also operates three skills-centres for people with disabilities. Secondary schools in Hong Kong are going to be cut down to only two years due to the switch in the government.

=== Alternative education options ===
International institutions provide both primary and secondary education in Hong Kong. International institutions teach with English as the primary language, with some sections bilingual in German, French and Chinese. International school students rarely take Hong Kong public exams. British students take GCSE, IGCSE, and A-levels. US students take APs. Increasingly, international schools follow the International Baccalaureate Diploma Programme (IBDP) and enter universities through non-JUPAS direct entry. International students apply on a per-school basis, whereas Hong Kong local students submit one application for multiple local universities as a JUPAS applicant.

=== Medium of instruction ===
In the 1990s, following the handover of Hong Kong, most secondary schools in the territory switched their medium of instruction from English to Chinese (Cantonese). The remaining 114 schools (about 20–30%) are known as EMI schools and are often viewed as prestigious. EMI schools also have far better university acceptance rates than CMI schools; hence, EMI schools are heavily sought after by parents and are often labelled as 'elite schools'. From 2009 onwards, schools which use Chinese as medium of instruction were also allowed to have classes that use English as medium of instruction.

In addition, the Hong Kong government has pushed the use of Putonghua (Standard Mandarin Chinese) as medium of instruction in the Chinese language subject (PMIC). As of 2015–2016, about 16.4% primary schools and 2.5% secondary schools have adopted Putonghua, instead of Cantonese, for teaching the Chinese language subject across all grades and classes. An additional 55.3% primary schools and 34.4% secondary schools have adopted Putonghua in some of their grades and classes. The remaining 28.3% primary schools and 63.1% secondary schools still use Cantonese in all their grades and classes.

== Tertiary and higher education ==
Higher education in Hong Kong has historically been exclusive. Fewer than 20,000 students were offered government-funded places in 1975, though the figure has been growing over the past decades. Many continue their studies abroad as shown in table below.

Country/Region	1975	1984	1986	1988	1990	1992	1994	1998	2000
Hong Kong	11,575	21,538	25,995	29,591	34,556	42,721	52,494	59,528	59,408
Australia	572	1,658	1,687	1,889	3,864	6,707	11,932	17,135	20,739
US	11,930	9,000	9,720	9,160	12,630	14,018	12,940	8,730	7,545
UK	4,434	6,500	6,935	7,300	7,700	7,600	7,400	5,450	5,200
Canada	6,644	7,723	6,730	5,840	6,372	6,600	6,589	5,000	5,000
Taiwan	2,626	3,816	3,854	3,850	3,633	3,450	2,663	1,487	1,171

Bachelor's degrees issued in Hong Kong have honours distinctions: first class, second class upper division, second class lower division, and third class. Since the introduction of a new academic structure in 2012, the duration of undergraduate programmes in Hong Kong has been switched from three years to four years.

=== Admission ===
The Joint University Programmes Admissions System (JUPAS) is the main route of application designed to assist students holding Hong Kong Diploma of Secondary Education (HKDSE) or Hong Kong Advanced Level Examination (HKALE) results in applying for admission to universities in Hong Kong.

=== Medium of instruction ===
English is the medium of instruction and assessment for most university programmes in Hong Kong.

=== UGC-funded universities ===
There are currently eight UGC-funded universities in Hong Kong:

UGC-funded universities in Hong Kong
Name	Acronym	Year Founded	Location
The University of Hong Kong	HKU	1911	Hong Kong Island
The Chinese University of Hong Kong	CUHK	1963	Shatin, New Territories
The Hong Kong University of Science and Technology	HKUST	1991	Clear Water Bay, New Territories
The Hong Kong Polytechnic University	PolyU	1937 (granted university status in 1994)	Hung Hom, Kowloon
City University of Hong Kong	CityU	1984 (granted university status in 1994)	Kowloon Tong, Kowloon
Hong Kong Baptist University	HKBU	1956 (granted university status in 1994)	Kowloon Tong, Kowloon
Lingnan University	LU	1967 (granted university status in 1999)	Tuen Mun, New Territories
The Education University of Hong Kong	EdUHK	1994 (granted university status in 2016)	Ting Kok, New Territories

HKU, CUHK, and HKUST are consistently ranked among the top 50 or top 100 universities worldwide, while PolyU and CityU are consistently ranked among the top 100 or top 200 universities worldwide. HKUST, PolyU, and CityU are also ranked among the best young universities worldwide.

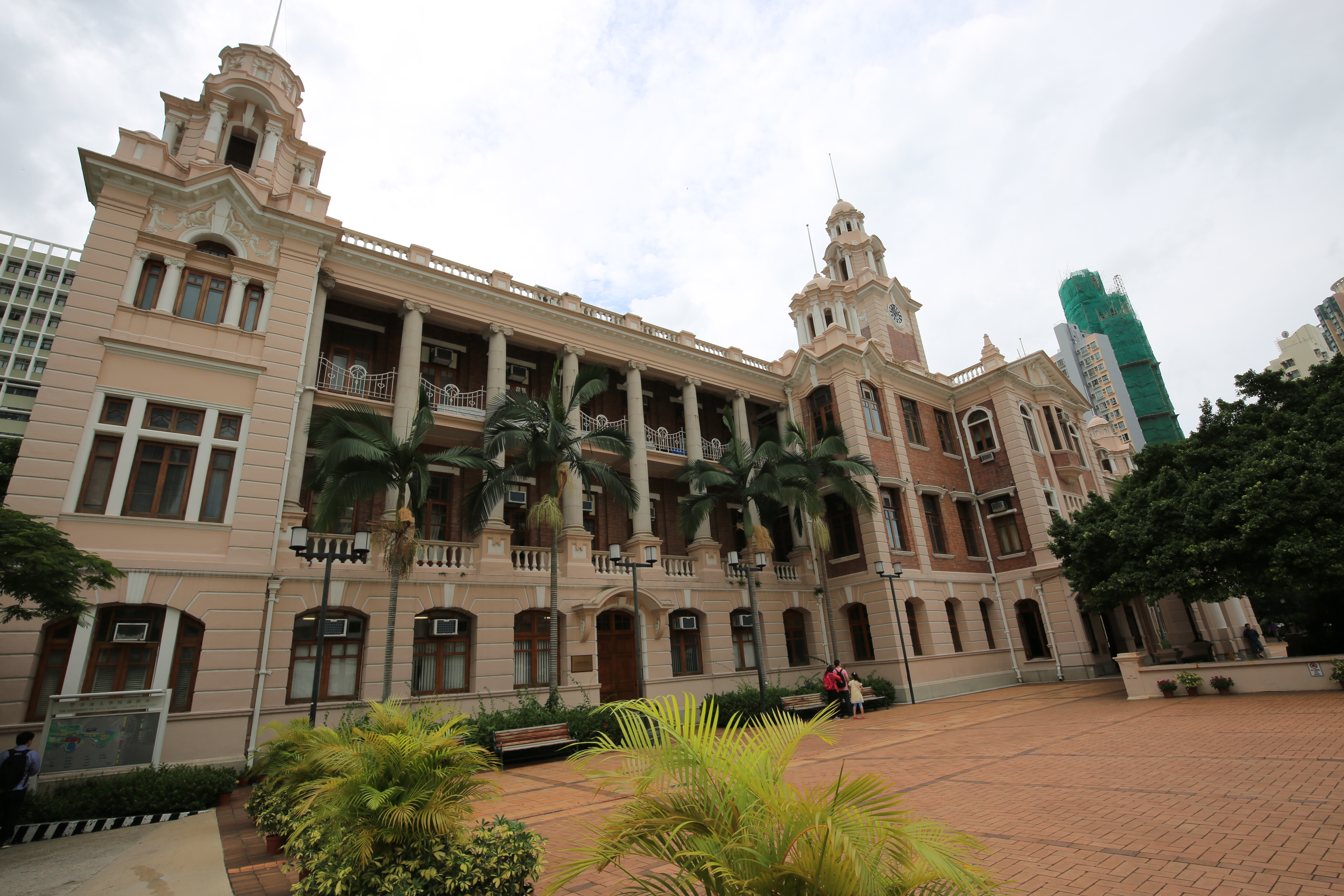
HKU

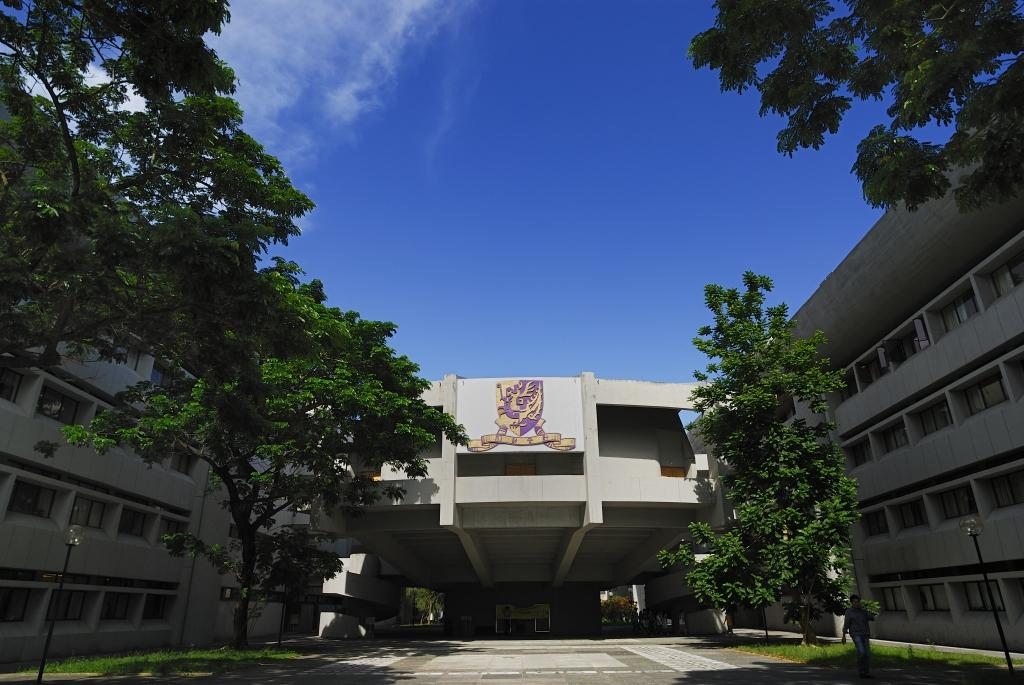
CUHK

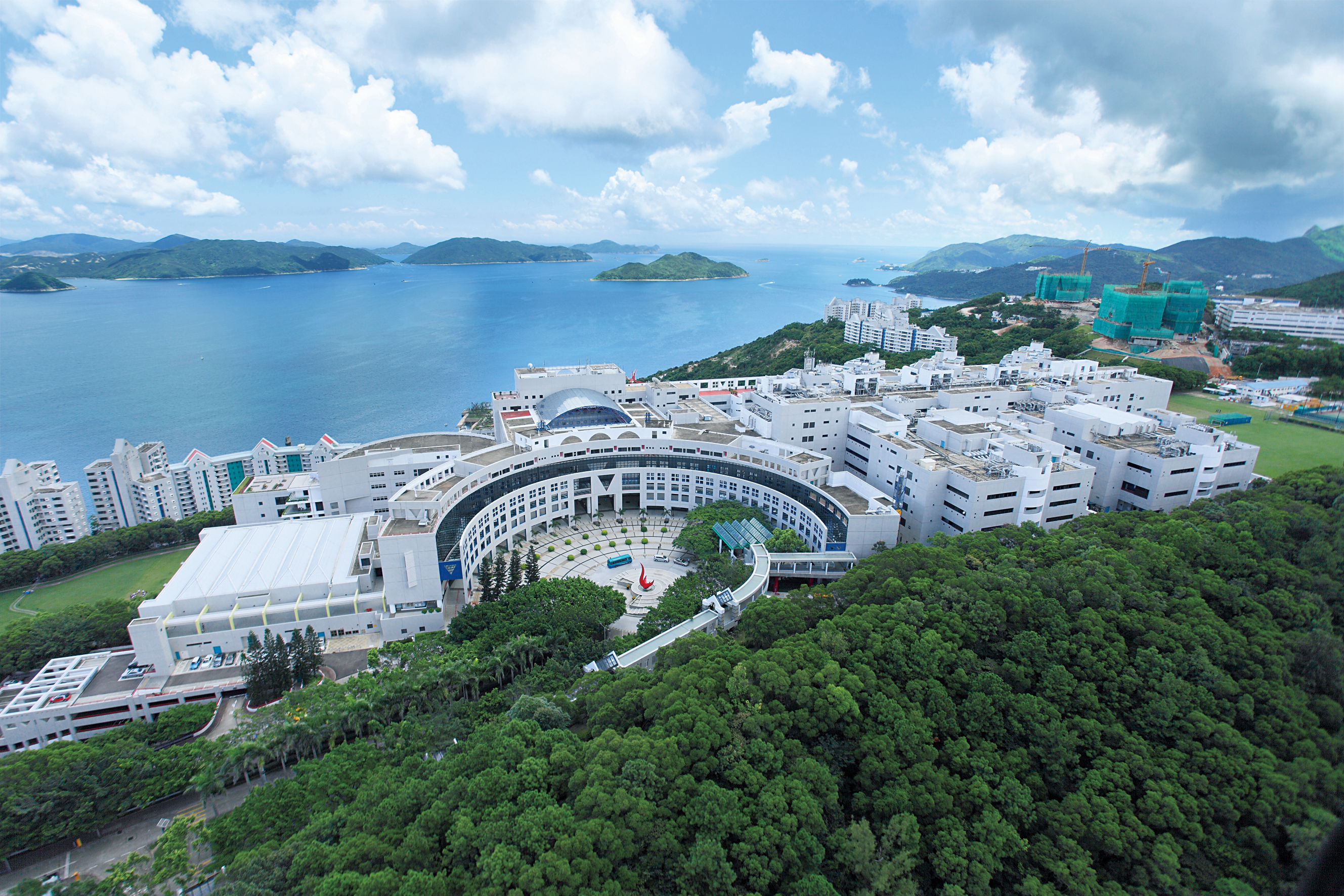
HKUST

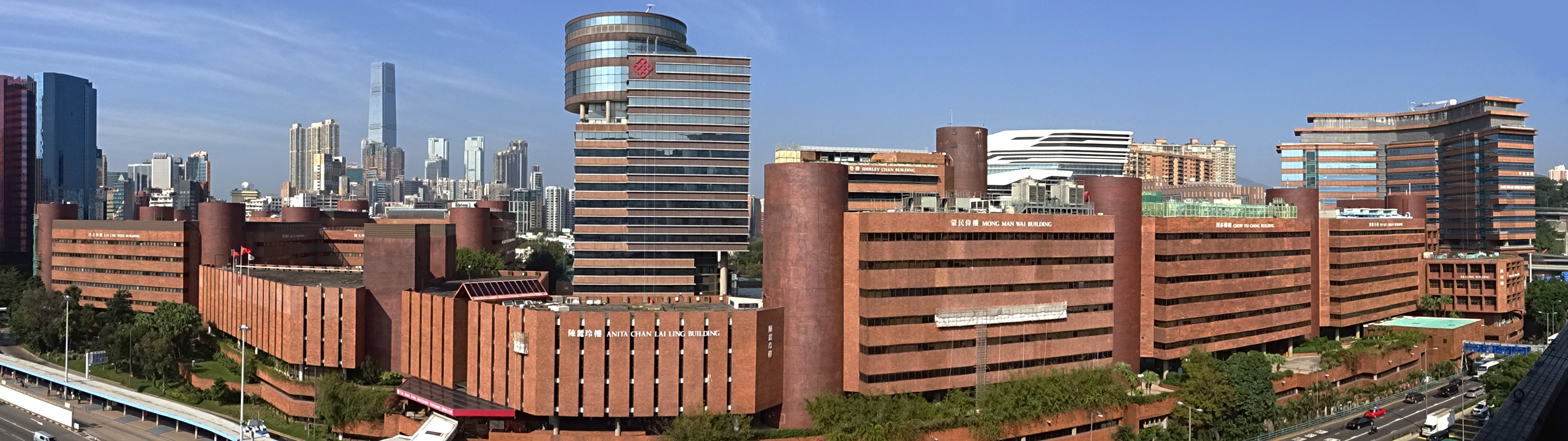
PolyU

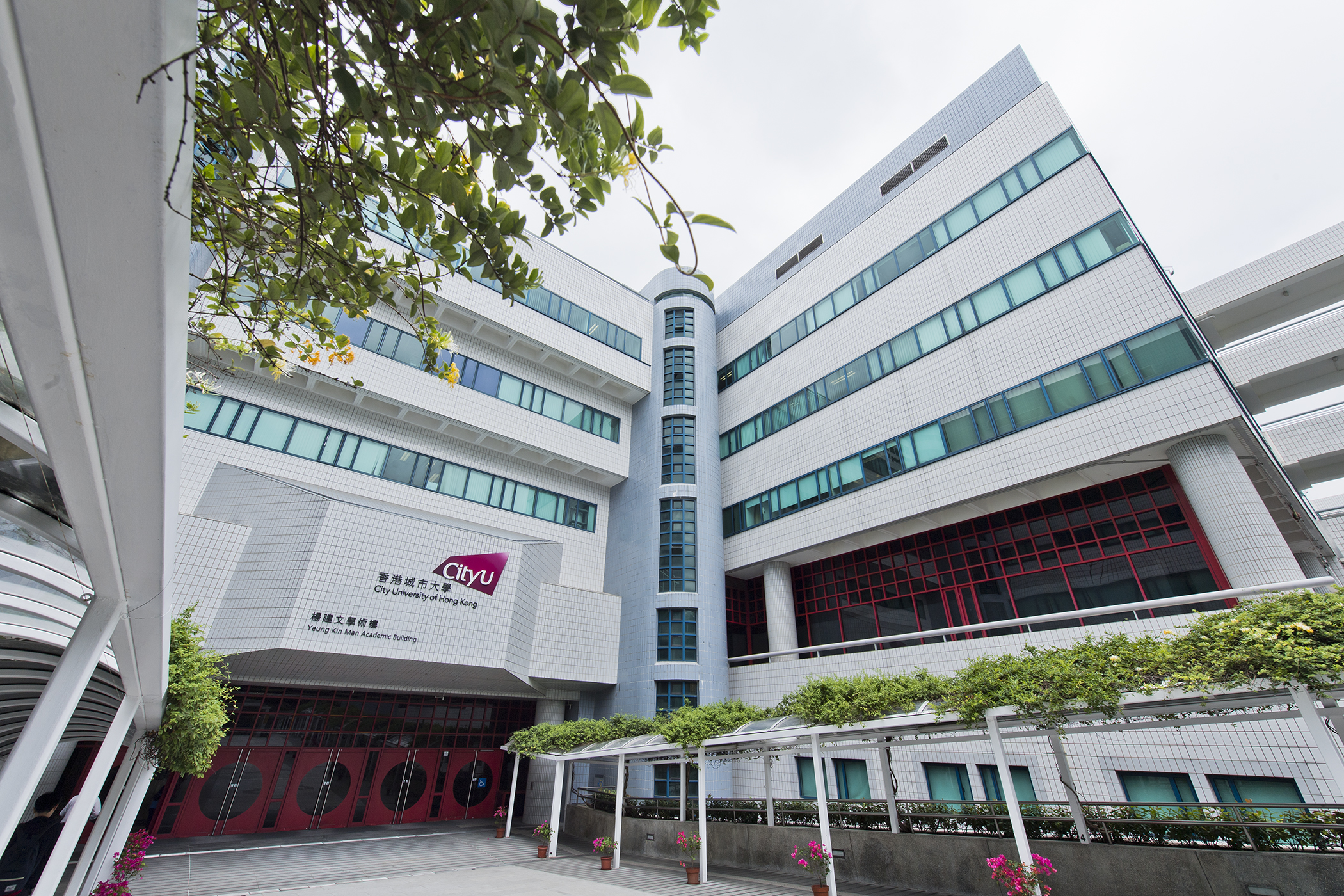
CityU

=== Publicly-funded institutions ===
- The Hong Kong Academy for Performing Arts (HKAPA, founded in 1984) – The Hong Kong Academy for Performing Arts Ordinance (Cap.1135)

=== Self-financing institutions – Statutory university ===
- Hong Kong Metropolitan University (HKMU; formerly the Open University of Hong Kong, OUHK; founded in 1989, granted university status in May 1997) – The Open University of Hong Kong Ordinance (Cap. 1145)

=== Self-financing institutions – Approved post secondary colleges ===
Approved post secondary colleges are educational institutes registered under the Post Secondary Colleges Ordinance (Cap. 320). This kind of colleges are allowed to give out academic awards at bachelor's degree level or above as well as to include the Chinese words "學院" or "大學", or the English word "University" in the registration name with prior approval from the Chief Executive-in-Council.

- Hong Kong Shue Yan University (HKSYU, founded in 1971, granted university status in December 2006)
- Hang Seng University of Hong Kong (HSUHK, founded in 2010, granted university status in October 2018)
- Chu Hai College of Higher Education
- HKCT Institute of Higher Education
- Tung Wah College
- Caritas Institute of Higher Education
- Centennial College
- Gratia Christian College
- Hong Kong Nang Yan College of Higher Education
- Technological and Higher Education Institute of Hong Kong (THEi), Vocational Training Council
- UOW College Hong Kong

== Adult education ==
Adult education is popular, since it gives middle age adults a chance to obtain a tertiary degree. The concept was not common several decades ago. The EMB has commissioned two non-profit school operators to provide evening courses. The operators have fee remission schemes to help adult learners in need of financial assistance. Adult education courses also provide Vocational Training Council through universities and private institutions. The Open University of Hong Kong is one establishment for mature students. Several secondary schools operate adult education sessions, the first being Cheung Sha Wan Catholic Secondary School, while PLK Vicwood KT Chong Sixth Form College offers associate degree and joint-degree programmes.

== Special education ==
However, since special education is accused of being a measure of discrimination and separation, the British education suggests that integrated education should be the leading factor, and many special schools will be forced to transform. Since the 2000s, special schools in Hong Kong have also followed this trend, except for moderately to severely intellectual disability students, other types of special schools need to be transformed into mainstream schools to accept students without disabilities.

== Education for immigrant and non-Cantonese-speaking children ==
The Education Bureau provides education services for immigrant children from mainland China and other countries, as well as non-Cantonese-speaking Hong Kong children. Free "Induction Programmes" of up to 60 hours have been offered to NAC by non-government organisations. The EMB also provides a 6-month full-time "Initiation Programme" incorporating both academic and non-academic support services, for NAC before they are formally placed into mainstream schools. The social issue aroused the interest of academic researchers to publish work about NACs' adaptation and school performance

In 2017 the Hong Kong government schools had 6,267 Pakistani students, the largest non-local bloc, and 818 white students of any national background. In 2013 there were 556 white students of any background in Hong Kong government schools. Historically, non-local students from other Asian countries attended government schools, while white students attended private schools. In 2018 Angie Chan of The New York Times reported that increasing numbers of white students were enrolling in Cantonese-medium government schools. This was due to increasing tuitions from international schools which received influxes of wealthy mainland Chinese and desires from parents for white students to learn Cantonese.

== International education ==
As of January 2015, the International Schools Consultancy (ISC) listed Hong Kong as having 175 international schools. ISC defines an 'international school' in the following terms "ISC includes an international school if the school delivers a curriculum to any combination of pre-school, primary or secondary students, wholly or partly in English outside an English-speaking country, or if a school in a country where English is one of the official languages, offers an English-medium curriculum other than the country's national curriculum and is international in its orientation." This definition is used by publications including The Economist.

While the ISC definition allows for an objective number it does also mean that the count of "international schools" is often considerably higher than the number of schools that would be relevant to an international, expatriate audience. WhichSchoolAdvisor.com, a review-based site that looks exclusively at schools attended by expatriates, has 100 international schools listed in its directory, less than the ISC count, but still 17 more than its great city rival, Singapore. Of these, 24 schools follow in part or in full a UK-based curriculum (largely the I/GCSE up to 16, A Level post 16), while others follow a UK/International Baccalaureate blend with the IB Diploma offered for post-16 study. Some 33 schools in Hong Kong currently offer the Diploma.

Hong Kong's international schools are not subject to independent inspection reports by the territory's regulator, meaning word of mouth tends to drive reputation as to what are considered to be the best performing international schools in the territory. A large number of parent forums exist that help parents new to Hong Kong make an often very difficult decision.

Private, international schools come at very different prices. The most expensive school is currently Li Po Chun United World College of Hong Kong, with average annual fees of HKD $360,000 (US$46,450.13). These fees are skewed by the fact that this school is boarding only, and only for the students studying the last two years of the IB. The next most expensive school in the territory is the Chinese International School (CIS), an IB continuum, bi-lingual school (Mandarin and English). Its average fees across year groups is currently HKD 216,500 (US$27,935).

In addition to the international day school, Hong Kong's Japanese population is served by a weekend education programme, the Hong Kong Japanese Supplementary School (香港日本人補習授業校, Honkon Nihonjin Hoshū Jugyō Kō; HKJSS).

The French International School of Hong Kong is the only accredited primary / secondary school by the French Ministry of Education, additionally it provides an english medium international stream and in 1988 was the first school in Hong Kong to offer the IB Diploma, making it the first International school in Hong Kong to become a World IB School.

In 2018 Angie Chan reported that increasing numbers of Chinese students, including Hong Kong Chinese and mainland Chinese, were enrolling in private international schools. In 2017 the percentage of foreign students in such institutions was under 75%, with Hong Kong Chinese being 21.6% and mainland Chinese being about 4%. In previous eras virtually the entire international school student body was foreign.

There are top-rated exempted courses where courses offered overseas are collaborated with local institutions in Hong Kong to broaden the scope of tertiary education in Hong Kong. MIT has an innovation node in Hong Kong.

== Types of schools ==
Type		Category	Description
Government schools		Comprehensive	Run by the government.
Aided schools	Subsidized schools	Comprehensive	Most common, run by charitable and religious (Christian, Buddhist, Taoist, TWGHs and others) organisations with government funding.
Aided schools	Grant schools	Subsidised	Schools run by charitable or religious organisations with government funding according to the now defunct Grant Code. Currently receiving government aid in accordance with the Codes of Aid, which also apply for the Subsidized schools.
Direct Subsidy Scheme (DSS) schools		Subsidised	Run by non-government organisations. HKSAR Government has encouraged non-government primary and secondary schools which have attained a sufficiently high education standard to join the DSS by providing subsidies to enhance the quality of private school education since 1991/92 school year. Under the scheme, schools are free to decide their curriculum, fees and entrance requirements, under the following conditions: The number of students doing the local curriculum (HKDSE) must be no less than half of all students.; All students must participate in the local TSA examinations.
Caput schools		Subsidised	Subsidies are provided according to the number of pupils admitted.
Private schools		Private	Run by private organisations and mainly accept local Chinese children. Admissions are based more on academic merit than on financial ability; they teach in English and in Cantonese.
Private international schools		Private	Provide an alternative to the mainstream education, in exchange for much higher tuition fees although it is recently deemed as high-pressure as local mainstream education. The schools teach streams in English and in the language of its sponsoring nation, e.g., French, German, Japanese, etc.
English Schools Foundation		Partially subsidised until 2028	Provide an alternative to the high-pressured mainstream education. Tuition fees are lower than many other international schools as many ESF schools enjoy subvention by the Hong Kong Government to educate English-speaking children who cannot access the local system.ESF Annual Report 22/23

== Legacy ==
=== From 1970s/80s to 2011/12 ===
Length	Education type	Additional names	Type	Focus	School year
3 years	Kindergarten		voluntary	General	Sept – June
6 years	Primary education	Primary 1 to 6	compulsory	General	Sept – July
3 years	Secondary education	Form 1 to 3	compulsory	General	Sept – July
2 years	Senior secondary (leads to HKCEE)	Form 4 and Form 5	selective	Specialised	Sept – July (Form 4), Sept – April (Form 5)
2 years	Matriculation course (leads to HKALE)	Form 6 (Lower Sixth Form); Form 7 (Upper Sixth Form)	selective, performance based	Specialised	Sept – July (Form 6), Sept – February/March (Form 7)
Depends on subject	Tertiary education (leads to certificates, various diplomas, bachelors, postgraduate certificates or diplomas, master's, or PhD)		selective	Specialised	Varies

=== From 2012/13 to present ===
Length	Education type	Additional names	Type	Focus	School year
3 years	Kindergarten		voluntary	General	Sept – June
6 years	Primary education	Primary 1 to 6	compulsory	General	Sept – July
3 years	Junior secondary education	Junior Secondary 1 to 3 (Form 1 to 3)	compulsory	General	Sept – July
3 years	Senior secondary education (leads to Hong Kong Diploma of Secondary Education)	Senior Secondary 1 to 3 (Form 4 to 6)	selective	Specialised	Sept – July (Senior Secondary 1–2), Sep – Feb (Senior Secondary 3)
Depends on subject	Tertiary education (leads to certificates, diplomas, associates, professional diploma, higher diploma, advanced diploma, bachelors, post-graduate certificates or diplomas, masters, phd)		selective	Specialised	Varies

== Class size ==
In the past, many primary schools in Hong Kong adopted a half-day schooling system to accommodate the high demand for education. This arrangement involved splitting the school day into two sessions, with separate headmasters overseeing each session. To compensate for the reduced school hours, students were occasionally required to attend school on alternate Saturdays. In line with government policy, half-day schooling was gradually phased out as resources allowed. Most schools have now transitioned towards full-day school systems.

In recent years, the decline in birth rate has had a significant impact on primary schools, leading to class reductions. This has sparked debates on the potential benefits of promoting small class teaching. Proponents posit that implementing small class sizes would help alleviate the pressures faced by teachers and address the challenges arising from reduced student-to-teacher ratios, class sizes, and school capacities.

== Discipline ==
Good behaviour has always been emphasised in Hong Kong, to the point that it is sometimes said to hinder pupils' development. Misbehaviour is recorded and shown on school reports. The Education Bureau (EDB) provides the 'Guidelines for Student Disciplines' to schools to as guidance in creating a disciplined education environment. It outlines the principles and policies regarding student discipline, the organisational structure of a school discipline team, the roles and responsibilities of the discipline master and mistress, and discipline strategies illustrated with case studies.

== Culture ==
Education in Hong Kong has often been described as 'spoon-fed'. Cram schools in Hong Kong have also become a popular standard in parallel to regular education. Teachers focus on helping students getting high scores in the major exams and heavily rely on textbook knowledge rather than exchanging ideas and essence of the subjects.

With the advent of education reform there is a greater emphasis on group projects, open-ended assignments on top of traditional homework. The current workload of a primary student in Hong Kong includes approximately two hours of schoolwork nightly. Along with extra-curricular activities, Hong Kong's education has become synonymous for leaning towards quantity. As early as March 1987, education advisory inspectors became concerned with the excessive amounts of "mechanical work and meaningless homework". In particular, history education has been recognised as ineffective, with critics claiming that the curriculum is not capable of delivering a sense of identity. Not only that, students have to memorise the whole history texts, thereby indicating that rote-learning has greater priority than absorbing and understanding material.

== See also ==
- List of schools in Hong Kong
- Higher Education in Hong Kong
- List of universities in Hong Kong
- Education in the People's Republic of China
- 334 Scheme
- EMI schools
- A Passage a Day
- Morrison Education Society School
