= A Passage a Day =

School reading scheme in Hong Kong

A Passage A Day
- Website type: online-reading, educational
- Owners: New Horizon Education & Research Ltd.
- Creator: Professor Ho Man Koon (CUHK / HKIER)
- Website: prof-ho.com/reading

A Passage A Day (Chinese: 每日一篇) is a Chinese language reading scheme for all primary and secondary schools in Hong Kong, founded by Ho Man Koon of the Hong Kong Institute of Educational Research, The Chinese University of Hong Kong in 2000. It is the most populated web learning platform in Hong Kong. Between January and May 2004, there were approximately 5.5 million visits each day. The scheme helps pupils and students to read regularly, tactically, rapidly and to widen their knowledge horizon.

Its web platform provides a new article with three questions each day for the users. Each reading record is kept for tracking and assessment by teachers and the users themselves. Each student or school involved in this programme is given a school ID number, user ID number and a user password.

== Point System ==
There are six levels for students and only a few of them are possible for the (users) to access due to their grade level. (e.g. Grade Five students are only allowed to read Levels 3, 4, and 5) Level 1 is mainly for beginners and (users) are able to listen to a "read-a-loud" voice. Points are given to students (users) who can complete the 3 multiple answer questions after reading the assigned article or essay, the answers to which may be found inside the article. The awarded number of points equals to the number of words having read. There is a link showing the distribution of points of the students' (users) class and those of the same grade.
