= Hong Kong Advanced Level Examination =

Former school qualification in Hong Kong

- Traditional Chinese: 香港高級程度會考
- Simplified Chinese: 香港高级程度会考
Transcriptions
Standard Mandarin
- Hanyu Pinyin: Xiānggǎng Gāojí Chéngdù Huìkǎo
Yue: Cantonese
- Jyutping: hoeng1 gong2 gou1 kap1 cing4 dou6 wui6 haau2

The Hong Kong Advanced Level Examination (HKALE, 香港高級程度會考), or more commonly known as the A-level, conducted by the Hong Kong Examinations and Assessment Authority (HKEAA), was taken by senior students at the end of their matriculation in Hong Kong between 1979 and 2012. It was originally the entrance examination in University of Hong Kong until the introduction of the Joint University Programmes Admissions System (JUPAS) in 1992, which made it the major university entrance examination for all local universities until academic year 2011/2012.

The examination was conducted from March to May, and the results were routinely released in the first week of July (or late June). There were altogether 17 A-level and 17 AS-level subjects in the HKALE (2007 – 2012). AS-level was commonly known as Hong Kong Advanced Supplementary Level Examination (HKASLE), which was first held in 1994. AS-level subjects were taught within half the number of periods compared to that required for A-level subjects, but they demanded the same level of intellectual rigour. Most day school candidates took four or five subjects in the HKALE. Apart from Chinese Language and Culture and Use of English which were taken by almost every school candidate, and other language-related subjects, all subjects could be taken in either English or Chinese. The same standards were applied in both marking and grading; the instruction medium is not recorded on the results notices nor certificates. The examination of an A-level subject generally consists of two 3-hour papers taken in the morning and afternoon of the same day.

The results of the HKALE are expressed in terms of six grades A – F, of which grade A is the highest and F the lowest. Results below grade F are designated as unclassified (UNCL). The abolishment of fine grades used in 2001 (i.e. A(01), A(02), B(03), B(04), etc.) was in force from 2002. Historically the Hong Kong A level (HKALE) grade C has been aligned by NARIC to GCE grade A.

It was well-criticized that AL subjects demand substantial memorization and clarification of difficult concepts such as Chinese History, Biology, and Economics which have their syllabus partly equivalent to first-year undergraduate courses in terms of the length and depth. Research-level knowledge is also required in specific AL subjects such as Pure Mathematics and Chemistry. Actually, it was thought that the examinations were intentionally designed to be difficult by stakeholders for different reasons such as UK-imposed elitism as well as limited university seats dated back to 1992. It was even conspired that the past stakeholders intentionally made it difficult to hinder the growth of local people, in contrast to their well-funded stakeholders who usually went for overseas education but returned to manage their family businesses. However, such world-class exams do lead to the births of different famous local professors, resulting in the golden era of higher education in Hong Kong since the 2010s.

With the introduction of the Early Admissions Scheme in 2001, top scorers in HKCEE could skip the HKALE and enter universities directly after Form 6. Therefore, the HKALE in 2002 was the last one which all HKCEE top scorers needed to take for university admission in Hong Kong.

As a part of the educational reform in Hong Kong, the examination was abolished after academic year 2012/2013. The final HKALE in 2013 was only offered to private candidates who had taken the HKALE before, and the exam results could not be used to apply for universities through the JUPAS as before, but only through the Non-JUPAS system.

== Background ==
Prior to 1993, students needed to choose among two university entrance examinations, the HKALE or the Hong Kong Higher Level Examination. The former originally led to a three-year course in the University of Hong Kong (HKU) at the end of Form Seven (Upper Six), mainly for students in English-medium schools. The latter led to a four-year course in the Chinese University of Hong Kong (CUHK), then operated in Chinese, at the end of Form Six (Lower Six) for students in Chinese-medium schools.

Later on, the majority of education authorities considered that the "dual-band" examination system had become practically unsuitable and that a unified matriculation system would be urgently needed, as stated in a report presented to the Organisation for Economic Co-operation and Development as early as in 1981. In the report, the "dual-band" system was found to be the crux that caused confusion and anxiety among Hong Kong students, in addition to the inevitably keen competition for tertiary places (Hong Kong Education Department, 1981, p. 178).

Through considerable debates (Tang and Bray, 2000), programmes in CUHK switched to three-year systems as those launched in HKU in 1991. Consequently, the Hong Kong Higher Level Examination was abolished and was finally merged with today's HKALE. Advanced Supplementary Level subjects were also implemented at the same time to cater for different needs of candidates (Hong Kong Examinations and Assessment Authority, 2003, p. 4).

== HKALE and UK A-Levels Equivalence ==
The results of the HKALE were expressed in terms of seven grades: A – U. Historically the Hong Kong A level (HKALE) grade C has been aligned by NARIC to GCE grade A. This decision seems to have been based upon the portion of candidates passing the HKALE at different grades – just under 25% achieved a grade C or higher in Hong Kong A levels overall in 2008. This compares to just under 26% achieving a GCE grade A in 2008. In setting standards for the HKDSE, levels 4 and 5 (including 5, 5*, 5**) will be set with reference to the standards achieved by students awarded grades A-D in the current HKALE.

As an additional reference, the entrance requirements for universities and government positions in Hong Kong officially aligned 3 as an E in the corresponding HKALE subjects. For example, according to the document from the Legislative Council of Hong Kong, a candidate attaining Level 3 in NSS subjects in the HKDSE will be regarded as having met the requirement of Grade E in the HKALE or Grade C in the HKCEE in similar subjects for grades or posts with specific subject requirements.

HKALE Grade (Benchmarked HKDSE Equivalence)	UK A-Level Grade (GCE ALs) Equivalence	UCAS Tariff (2009)
A (5**)	A*	145
B (5*)	A	130
C (5)	A	120
D/E (4)	B/C	80
E/F (3)	D/E	40
U (1)	Unclassified, a grade lower than F	

== Use of English examination ==
The AS-level examination, which is commonly taken with the A-Levels, tests the ability of students to understand and use English at a level that is required for tertiary education.

The Use of English (UE) examination was introduced in 1989 as an independent subject instead of an A level subject, as an entrance requirement of HKU. It was divided into four sections to test students' listening, writing, reading and language skills and practical skills for work and study.

From 1994, the UE examination became an AS-level subject and a requirement for JUPAS degree-level programme, and a 20-minute oral examination was added in the reform.

There are five sections in the UE Examination:

- Section A – Listening Test
  It lasted for 1 hour and was allocated 18% of the total subject mark. The recording was played once only, divided into two continuous dialogues based on a situation until 2002 and three from 2003. Candidates were required to follow what they hear to take notes or interpret pictures. The recorded exam material was broadcast on RTHK and candidates had to use their own radios to listen. RTHK Radio 2 (Radio 4 until 2002) broadcast a version of Ralph Vaughan Williams' Fantasia on Greensleeves played by the Sinfonia of London, conducted by Sir John Barbirolli before and during the intermissions of the test. After the end of exam materials, candidates were given 10 minutes to tidy up their answers and the radio station broadcast Johann Strauss's The Blue Danube, played by the orchestra of Vienna Volksoper and conducted by Franz Bauer-Theussl, which was then followed by the end-of-exam announcement, also on the radio.
- Section B – Writing
  It lasted for 1 hour and 15 minutes and was allocated 18% of the total subject mark. Candidates were required to choose a topic out of four options and write an expository essay of approximately 500 words.
- Section C – Reading and Language Systems
  It lasted for 1 hour and 30 minutes and was allocated 18% of the total subject mark. The reading part had multiple-choice questions based on a passage taken from a publication. A third of the total mark of the entire paper is allocated to this section. Types of questions were multiple-choice questions on cloze passage and continuity. There were also matching, cloze summary and proofreading exercises to test candidates' overall language skills.
- Section D – Oral
  It lasted for 20 minutes and was allocated 18% of the total subject mark. There should be a minimum of three candidates and a maximum of four candidates in each group. Candidates were given 10 minutes to read a passage of 300 words and prepare a presentation based on the passage of up to 2 minutes. After each candidate gave a presentation, the group was given two minutes to prepare mentally for a discussion of eight minutes for 3 candidates and ten minutes for 4 candidates.
- Section E – Practical Skills for Work and Study
  It lasted for 1 hour and 45 minutes and was allocated 28% of the total subject mark. Candidates were given a situation, a role and 2–3 tasks to perform. They were given a data file containing information in various formats and with the data file and were to select the kind of relevant information needed to fulfill the tasks required. Writing tasks involved could be a report, an article, a letter, a proposal or a newsletter.

A pass in the UE was considered essential to being accepted to any degree program under the Joint University Programmes Admissions System, but some universities accepted a band 6 in IELTS or similar as an alternative of HKALE English pass.

=== Comparison with IELTS ===
A survey was conducted to equate the results with the International English Language Testing System by the HKEAA.

HKASL	A	B	C	D	E
IELTS	7.41 – 8.30	6.92 – 7.40	6.51 – 6.91	6.03 – 6.50	5.40 – 6.02

=== Controversy of new marking scheme ===
The controversy followed the HKEAA's announcement in 2007 that if a candidate exceeded the word limit (500 words) in a task in Section E (Practical skills for work and study), anything written beyond the limit would not be marked. However, according to the marking guidelines issued the previous year, students who did so should be deducted only two marks from the style mark for doing so. That resulted in criticism by many students, who claimed that although the word limit instruction was stated in the paper, they were not clearly informed of the marking criteria and that the marking scheme the HKEAA adopted in the previous year gave them a misleading impression. The authority later stated that candidates should have read all instructions before attempting the questions. It also stated that candidates who followed the instructions strictly should be treated fairly.

== Chinese Language and Culture examination ==
The examination was taken usually with other examinations to assess the ability of students in using Chinese and their understanding of Chinese culture. Introduced in the 1994 HKALE, the examination had tests in the following:

- Paper 1A – Practical writing (實用文類寫作);
- Paper 1B – Reading Comprehension (閱讀理解測驗);
- Paper 2 – Cultural issues (文化問題);
- Paper 3 – Listening (聆聽理解)
- Paper 4 – Oral Skills Assessment (說話能力測試); and
- Paper 5 – Extra Readings (課外閱讀) (School-based Assessment).

Like Use of English, as a required-pass subject for degrees in JUPAS, almost all of the students sat it. However, unlike the English Language, non-Chinese students who did not take the Chinese Language in HKCEE usually did not sit the examination, as JUPAS usually accepted an extra AS-level equivalent subject (or similar qualification to a Chinese Language pass) to replace the HKALE Chinese Language pass for students who never took part in Chinese Language in both HKCEE and HKALE and studied Chinese for less than 6 years. However, the Chinese University of Hong Kong did not recognise it and required those students to pass an internal Chinese Language test.

Before its introduction, AL Chinese Language and Literature had been offered in the HKALE as a traditional-styled Chinese language examination, with a paper on writing and reading comprehension, a paper on prescribed passages, and a paper on history of literature. This subject was not part of the entrance requirement of the University of Hong Kong; a grade of F or above in HKCEE Chinese Language or a pass in a foreign language in HKCEE sufficed to meet the second language requirement of the University of Hong Kong back then. However, the Chinese University of Hong Kong required that applicants with HKALE results pass this subject or pass the Chinese Language and Literature in the Hong Kong Higher Level Examination. Since 1994, this subject was changed to focus on the literature side and renamed Chinese Literature, and was no longer required by any universities.

Since there are many dialects of spoken Chinese, Paper 3 and Paper 4 could be taken either in Cantonese or in Putonghua, which had to be declared upon registration. Like other papers with Chinese and English versions, the choice of language was not printed on the certificate.

It was the first time that in a public examination listening and speaking components were added to the Chinese language test, and the practice was continued in the new Chinese language test introduced in the 2007 HKCEE, and in the Chinese language test in HKDSE until its abolishment in the 2024 HKDSE. Many people questioned the practice as treating the Chinese language, which is the native language for most Hong Kong students, as a foreign language like the English language. Also, it was pointed out that introvert students suffered great disadvantage in the speaking test, as their performance was affected by their personality and did not reflect their language ability.

=== Paper 1A – Practical Writing ===
The test lasted for 1 hour and 30 minutes and is allocated 20% of the total subject mark. Candidates were given information about a simulated situation and required to finish a writing of more than 600 words or two writings of no more than 700 words in total.

Options of text types could be:

- a formal letter;
- a personal letter;
- a script of public speech;
- a featured topic article;
- an argumentative criticism;
- a report (on a case investigation or a project, etc.);
- a proposal;
- a news article or
- minutes.

Unless quoting speeches from public figures, any names that needed to be used in the question had to use the name in the question or the name list from the question paper, if not available. Marks were deducted for violation. The rule was set up to prevent candidates from using names that could cause unfairness to other students.

=== Paper 1B – Reading Comprehension ===
The test lasted for 1 hour and was allocated 15% of the total subject mark.

Reading comprehension can be:

- a 2-piece reading (usually could passage written in Classical Chinese and another in Vernacular Chinese, widely used after the May Fourth Movement);
- a speed reading, which could be:
  - Type (1): usually seven to eight articles, unrelated to one another,
  - Type (2): three unrelated groups of articles (article in the same group could have the same theme, and occasionally students were required to compare and contrast them),
  - Type (3): four articles of the same theme, which again required candidates to make comparisons.

In 2005, the 3-piece reading of which all articles are written in Vernacular Chinese was formularised. The change, however, stirred up much controversy among candidates. The new format also demanded candidates to have a high proficiency in comprehension and understanding of rhetoric or euphemism words and phrases.

=== Paper 2 – Cultural issues ===
The test lasted for 1 hour and 30 minutes and was allocated 25% of the total subject mark.

The HKEAA recommended 6 articles as reading materials for reference. In fact, the authority never recommended candidates to memorise all the contents of the suggested materials. Furthermore, a wide-ranging reading habit was always appreciated:

1. A Conversation with the Youth about Chinese Culture (Excerpt) (與青年談中國文化), Tang Junyi (唐君毅)
2. Passion and Chinese Culture (Excerpt) (情與中國文化), Wu Sen (吳森)
3. Traditional Science: Past, Present and Future (With Appendices) (傳統科學的過去、現在與未來), Liu chun-ts'an (劉君燦)
4. The Fundamental Essence of Chinese Arts (中國藝術的基本精神), Zhao Yongxin (趙永新)
5. Traditional Chinese Society (Excerpt) (中國的傳統社會), Ambrose Yeo-Chi King (金耀基)
6. The Raison d'etre (人生的意義), Yin Hai-kuang (殷海光)

=== Paper 3 – Listening ===
The test lasted approximately 45 minutes and was allocated 15% of the total subject mark. Like the UE listening test, the exam material was broadcast on Radio 2. Like for the English test, Fantasia on Greensleeves was played before and during the intermissions of the examinations. The broadcast version was in Cantonese. The Putonghua students were assigned to designated examination venues, which provided CD tapes separately, with contents the same as those of Cantonese.

Candidates were required to answer questions as they listened to the material. Samples of questions were provided on the first two pages of the paper. Before 2003, candidates wrote sentences for answering questions. From 2003, multiple-choice involved ticking the correct answer and the "Fatal Four".

"Fatal Four" (奪命四式) was difficult for many candidates: they had to indicate the correctness of the given statements on the listening material. Possible answers are "true", "false", "partially correct" and "cannot be determined". Answers were not often given clearly or literally. Candidates were often required to analyse the implied meaning of a given speech during the course of listening, like the attitude of a speaker. Moreover, marks were deducted for a wrong answer, which could cause a negative mark. It was originally to prevent candidates from guessing an answer they did not know, but it caused trouble for some confusing questions.

=== Paper 4 – Oral Skills Assessment ===
The test had two parts, personal presentation and group discussion, both of them allocated 7.5% each of the total mark.

In personal presentation, 10 minutes of preparation time was given for candidates to make a 3-minute speech on a certain topic. Sometimes, candidates were asked to describe a picture.

After the personal presentation, group discussion took place. Normally 5 candidates in a group, it had 5-minute preparation time. Then, each candidate had 1 minute for the first-round speech, and 10 minutes time got them to discuss a topic freely.

In personal presentation, some personal topics were asked, and in group discussion, topics were related to major events or common issues.

=== Paper 5 – Extra Readings ===
This test was school-based in the sixth and seventh forms. Students were required to read at least 5 books and finish the related assessment, given by the school. Book reports were the most common format, but group presentations, or even in-class tests, were allowed.

Any book that was suitable was allowed. Guidelines with a list of recommended books were given to schools. Most schools required students to choose from the list or chose the books from the list for their students.

To prevent schools from giving too many extraordinary grades to students, points were to be adjusted by the performance in examination.

The list of recommended books had about 30 books about Chinese culture, ranging from novels or cultural studies to historic reports. Among the list of the books, Tangshan Earthquake was always on the top favour list of books, as the prologue of the book was one of the 26 required passages in the old Chinese Language syllabus in HKCEE (the new syllabus does not have any required passages).

=== Controversy of new format ===
In 2001, the HKEAA decided on an across-the-board revamp upon the format of questions in the exam. The changes included the replacement of questions on prescribed texts with open-ended questions in the questions on culture paper. It was HKEAA's attempt to prevent candidates from memorising the suggested reading materials. That, however, was dismissed by a number of candidates as a move towards the subject turning out into a saliva subject (吹水科, Jyutping: Ceoi1 Seoi2 Fo1) in which candidates concentrate on writing large amounts of verbose text and neglect the actual quality of the contents.

In 2005, the format of the Reading Comprehension paper was changed from speed reading of various articles to fine reading of only three articles, without prior notice. The move stirred up much controversy from some candidates, some of whom teased the words in one of the comprehension texts. The HKEAA reiterated its stance that there has not ever been a "specific" format for the exam and insisted that there was nothing wrong with the paper.

In the Listening exam of 2007, there was a part asking students to determine whether marked sentences were correct or not, based on the whole recording. There were 10 questions, carrying 2 marks each. In that part, if a candidate answered a question correctly, 2 marks were awarded but if the question was answered, 2 marks were deducted. No marks were given or deducted for blank answers. A candidate who answered all the questions, with no more than 5 being correct, would end up having no marks for that section, but if 5 were correct, 10 marks were given. That stirred up controversy among candidates, who claimed that the marking scheme was not fair. They said that all questions were compulsory so there should not be any advantage to those who left some of the blanks empty by deducting marks for wrong answers. The HKEAA said that it had been in practice for years to prevent students guessing answers, but in fact, this type of marking had appeared only in table-type questions in which candidates were required to tick some of the boxes in the table but not in questions in which all blanks were to be filled.

== List of subjects ==
Although the number of subjects offered was large, choices were limited as each school could offer only a few subjects on the list for budget constraints, restrictions on combinations of subjects and the actual time allowed to cover the large syllabus of different subjects. In addition, some of the subjects were unpopular. One could not take the AL and AS of a subject at the same examination. Students could take a maximum of 7 AL and/or AS subjects in one examination, but only a few students actually took 7 subjects from 2004.

- Applied Mathematics AL/AS ^{1}
- Biology AL ^{4}
- Business Studies AL
- Chemistry AL/AS ^{4}
- Chinese History AL/AS
- Chinese Language and Culture AS
- Chinese Literature AL
- Computer Applications AS ^{2} ^{4}
- Computer Studies AL ^{2} ^{4}
- Design and Technology AS ^{4} ^{6} ^{7}
- Economics AL/AS
- Electronics AS ^{4}
- Engineering Science AL ^{4} ^{5} ^{7}
- Ethics and Religious Studies AS
- Geography AL
- Government and Public Affairs AL/AS
- History AL/AS
- Liberal Studies AS
- Literature in English AL/AS
- Mathematics and Statistics AS ^{1} ^{3}
- Music AL/AS ^{7}
- Physics AL/AS ^{4} ^{5}
- Principles of Accounts AL
- Psychology AL/AS
- Pure Mathematics AL ^{3}
- Use of English AS
- Visual Arts (formerly Art before 2006) AL/AS ^{6}
1. AL/AS Applied Mathematics could not be taken with AS Mathematics and Statistics.
2. AS Computer Applications could not be taken with AL Computer Studies.
3. AL Pure Mathematics could not be taken with AS Mathematics and Statistics.
4. Practical Subjects could be taken by only school candidates or candidates who had taken that subject in previous HKALE examinations.
5. AL Engineering Science could not be taken with AL/AS Physics.
6. AS Design and Technology could not be taken with Paper 5, Section B of AL/AS Art.
7. Cancelled in 2007.

== Past results ==
Sometimes, for some AS-level subjects, less than 0.05% of the candidates could achieve grade A. However, there was always more than 0.05% of candidates achieving grade A in the full A-level counterpart of the subjects concerned. The AS-level syllabus of a certain subject was a selected part of the AL syllabus, but the questions of an AS-level examination were as difficult as the full AL counterpart. AS-level papers shared some of the questions with the AL counterpart and in those questions, the marking schemes for both A-level and the AS-level were identical.

1996 – 2007 HKALE Statistics of candidates' results in Use of English

	1996	1997	1998	1999	2000	2001	2002	2003	2004	2005	2006	2007
A %	0.9	0.9	0.9	1.0	0.9	0.9	0.9	0.7	0.6	0.6	0.6	0.7

1996 – 2008 HKALE Statistics of candidates' results in Physics (AS-level)

	1996	1997	1998	1999	2000	2001	2002	2003	2004	2005	2006	2007	2008
A %	1.8	0.2	0.5	0.4	1.8	0.1	0.5	0.8	0.0	0.0	0.0	0.3	0.9

== Abolition ==
The Education Bureau of Hong Kong announced that in 2009, the new schooling structure, under which all students receive 12 years of pre-university education, would be implemented. The HKALE was last administered in 2012 and then merged with the existing Hong Kong Certificate of Education Examination, to form the Hong Kong Diploma of Secondary Education examination at the end of the new, three-year senior secondary curriculum. The HKALE in 2013 was available only for students who had taken the exam before and could not be used to fulfil the JUPAS requirement.

As an aftermath of the abolishment, sixth form colleges are no longer needed. As a result, the first and now only such college in Hong Kong, PLK Vicwood KT Chong Sixth Form College, has changed mainly as a senior secondary school.

== See also ==
- Education in Hong Kong
- Hong Kong Certificate of Education Examination
- Joint University Programmes Admissions System
- Matriculation examination
