= Hong Kong Diploma of Secondary Education =

Academic qualification in Hong Kong

- Acronym: HKDSE
- Type: Paper-based Standardised Examination
- Administrator: Hong Kong Examinations and Assessment Authority
- Purpose: Admission to undergraduate programs of universities and colleges
- Year started: 2012
- Duration: Varies by subject
- Score range: Scored on Levels of 1–5, in one-level increments, then 5* to 5** within level 5
- Offered: Annually
- Regions: Hong Kong
- Languages: English, Traditional Chinese (Papers can be written in Simplified Chinese)
- Annual number of test takers: ▼50,803 (2024)
- Prerequisites: School candidates: Completion of Secondary School under NSS; Private candidates: None
- Fee: Language subjects: HK$747; Other subjects: HK$499; Initial Fee (Private Candidates): HK$572; Initial Fee (Mainland Candidates):HK$2,059
- Used by: Universities, locally through JUPAS, internationally via UCAS tariff points.
- Website: hkeaa.edu.hk/en/hkdse/

Hong Kong Diploma of Secondary Education
- Chinese: 香港中學文憑
Transcriptions
Yue: Cantonese
- Yale Romanization: Hēung góng jūng hohk màhn pàhng
- Jyutping: Hoeng1 gong2 zung1 hok6 man4 pang4

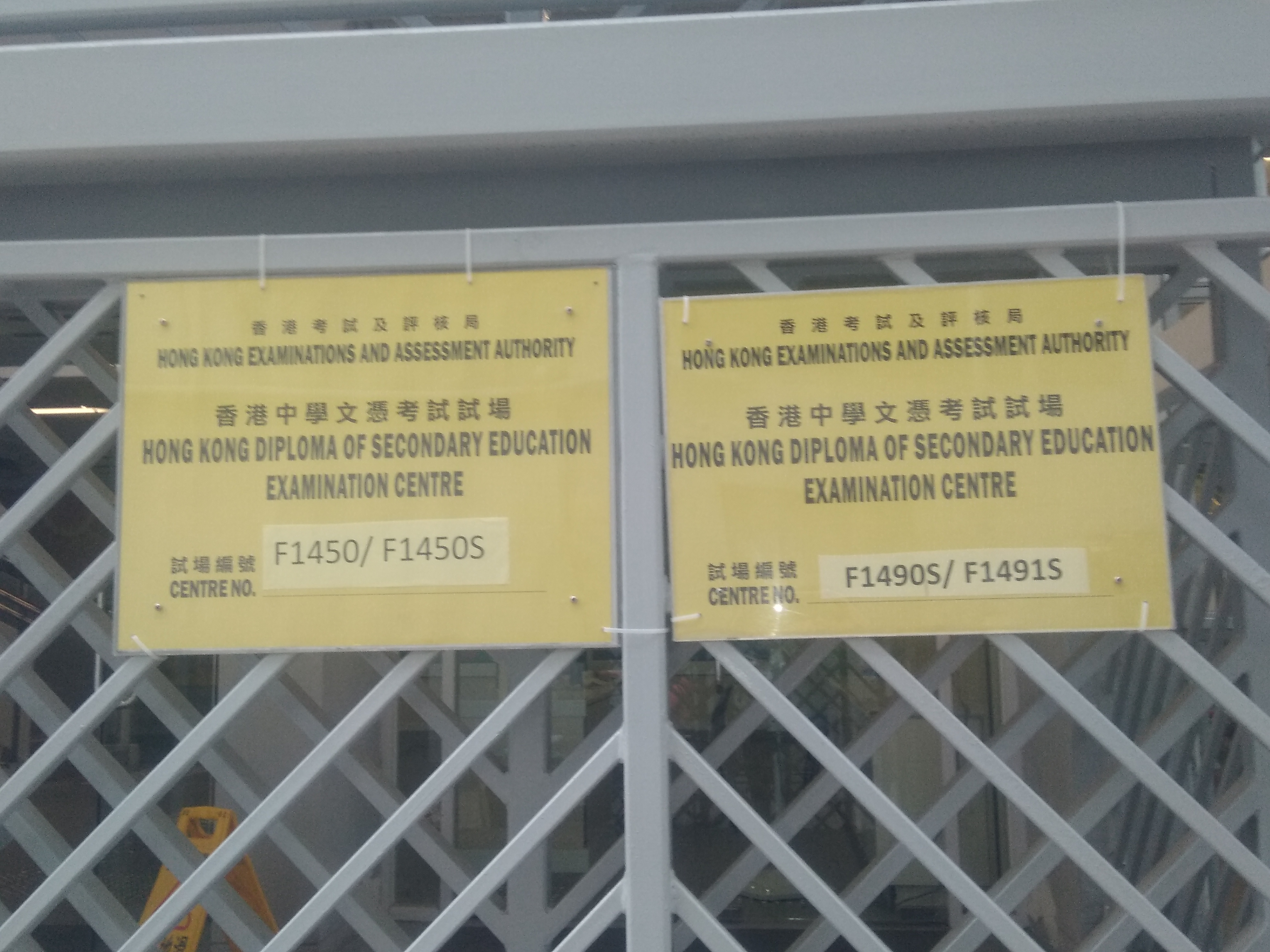
Notice board shown in HKDSE examination centres.

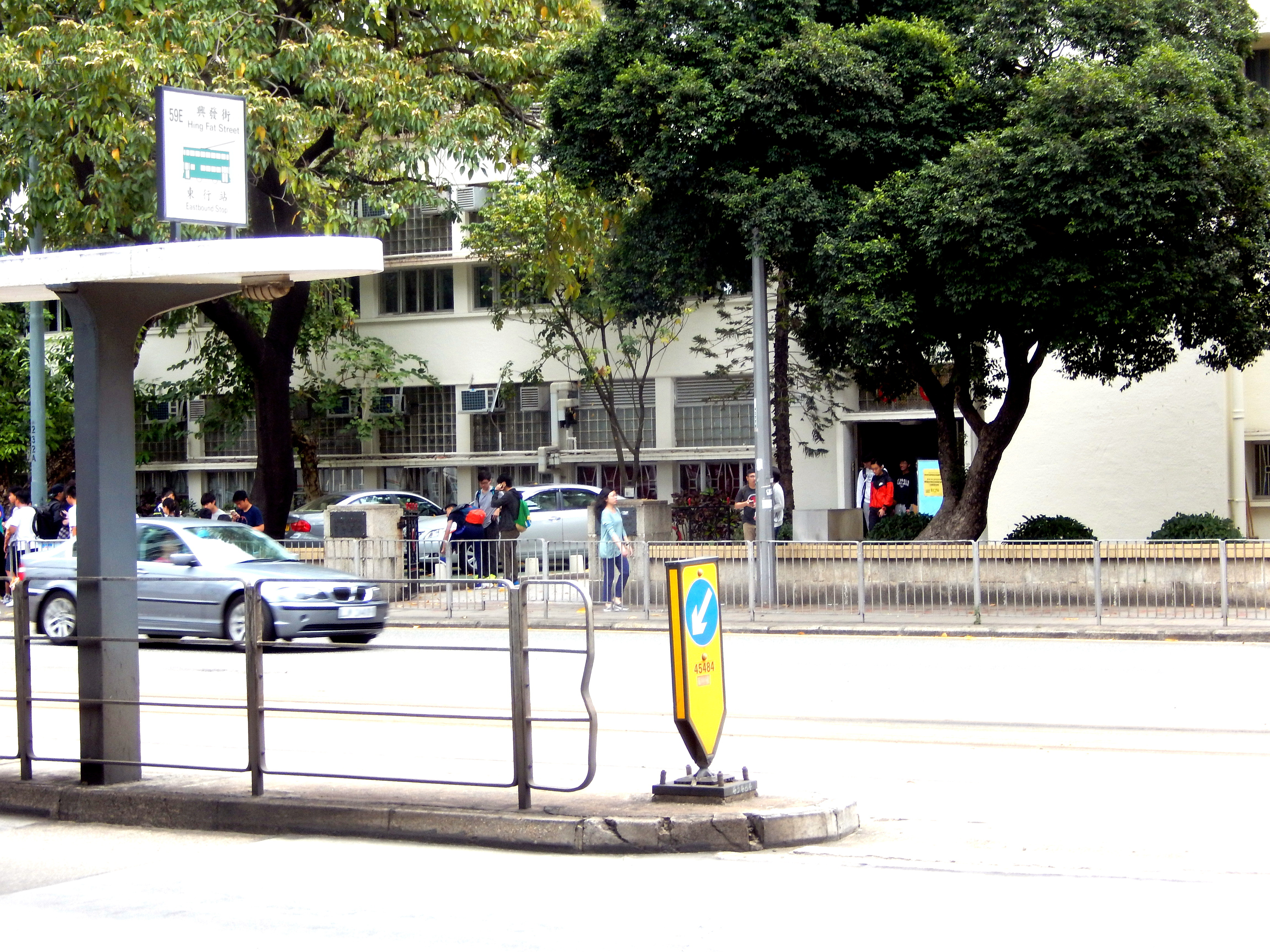
Candidates leaving the exam centre at Queen's College after sitting for the HKDSE English Language Paper 3 Listening and Integrated Skills examination.

The Hong Kong Diploma of Secondary Education (HKDSE) is an examination organised by the Hong Kong Examinations and Assessment Authority (HKEAA). The HKDSE examination is Hong Kong's university entrance examination, administered at the completion of the three-year New Senior Secondary (NSS) education, allowing students to gain admissions to undergraduate courses at local universities through JUPAS. Since the implementation of the New Senior Secondary academic structure in 2012, HKDSEE replaced the Hong Kong Certificate of Education Examination (O Level, equivalent of GCSE) and Hong Kong Advanced Level Examination (A Level).

Under the NSS academic structure, pupils are required to study four compulsory "Core Subjects" (Chinese Language, English Language, Mathematics, and Liberal Studies) and one to four "Elective Subjects" (the majority with two to three subjects) among the twenty available. On the 31 March 2021, it was announced that Liberal Studies would be renamed Citizenship and Social Development and have its curriculum revamped starting from the 2024 HKDSEE.

== Background and administration ==
Under the NSS, a number of subjects in the HKCEE and the HKALE have been combined to suit the varying interests and talents of students. School pupils study both core (compulsory) subjects and elective subjects. Most candidates in the HKDSEE sit all four core subjects plus two or three electives to satisfy local university admission requirements.

In some HKDSE subjects, each student studies the Compulsory Part along with an Extended Module of that subject of the student's choice, or in other cases, an Elective Part, which concentrates on a specific topic or skill. While in certain subjects such as Mathematics, students are only required to study the Compulsory Part, the Elective Modules are voluntary. As such, an Elective Part forms a part of the subject curriculum, whereas an Extended module is designed for students with specific aims or those who have higher abilities who may want additional knowledge and skills. The selection of offerings for both varies from school to school. For example, some schools offer both Extended Modules 1 and 2 for Mathematics, while others may offer only the Compulsory Part.

- Elective Part Example: English. The Elective Part of the English Language curriculum takes up 25% of total lesson time. The selection of Elective Parts is divided into two areas: "Language Arts" and "Non-Language Arts", each of which teaches English as used in different contexts and through various mediums. During HKDSEE, candidates also have the choice to write either the more difficult level (B2) or the standard level (B1) part of the paper, in addition to the mandatory Part A. Writing B1 allows the candidate to attain as high as level 4 in that paper, while writing B2 allows a 5**(five-double-star), the highest level obtainable.
- Extended Module Example: Mathematics. Students who wish to study Mathematics to a higher level have the flexibility to choose one of the two Extended Modules: "M1" Calculus and Statistics or "M2" Algebra and Calculus. However, the Extended Modules are considered only half a subject by the HKEAA, despite having syllabi amounting to full elective subjects. As a result, they became not as attractive to students, and there has been a decline in number of pupils studying them.

Written examinations of Category A (Traditional) subjects are usually conducted between early March through early May. Speaking (Oral) components and examinations for certain Category B (Applied Learning) subjects are administered earlier. Category C (Other Languages) subjects usually take place in June (French and Spanish may be taken in the previous November), in line with CAIE AS-level practice.

Before the exam, candidates have a chance to become familiar with the different level descriptors and samples and may use them as objectives for their study. Also, they can familiarise with the exam requirement by doing DSE Past Paper, which can be found here. For each level, there is a DSE cut off score. Thus, tertiary institutions and employers also have more accurate and robust information for admission or recruitment purposes.

== Subjects ==
HKDSE subjects are offered in three different categories, including 24 in Category A: NSS (Traditional), over 40 in Category B: ApL (Applied Learning) and 6 in Category C: Other Languages.

=== Category A: New Senior Secondary Subjects ===
Category A subjects are traditional school subjects. Exams in this category are held directly by HKEAA. Both Core Subjects (Compulsory for University Admission) and Elective Subjects fall under Category A. Results of these subjects are generally accepted for local and international university admission.

Core subjects

- Chinese Language
- English Language
- Mathematics
- Before 2024: Liberal Studies (levels are divided into 7 parts, from 1 to 5**)
- Starting from 2024: Citizenship and Social Development (divided only into 2 levels, attained or unattained)

For Mathematics, in addition to the Compulsory Part, candidates may take one of the following Extended Modules:

- Module 1 ("M1", Calculus and Statistics).
- Module 2 ("M2", Algebra and Calculus).

Candidates are allowed to choose only one of the two extended modules when sitting for the same year's public exams. The compulsory part of mathematics and its extended module are officially seen as one singular subject; hence they must be taken in the same language (of English or Chinese) and alongside the compulsory part of Mathematics. The compulsory part and the extended modules’ examination papers are however separated and are taken on separate dates. Levels attained are also printed separately on the diploma certificate.

For Liberal Studies, the subject curriculum featured six Modules, including:

- "Personal Development and Interpersonal Relationships."
- "Hong Kong Today."
- "Modern China."
- "Globalization."
- "Public Health."
- "Energy Technology and the Environment."

In most cases, a pass in an Extended Part of a subject cannot substitute a pass in the Compulsory Part for university admission, especially when applying through JUPAS for UGC-funded courses.

Electives

Students can choose one to four electives among 20 Elective Subjects according to their interests and strengths. However, most schools do not offer a full selection of the 20 subjects in their curriculum due to practical limitations.

According to the Registration Statistics for 2018 released by the HKEAA, the most chosen subject is Physics, with a total of 11,658 candidates. Around 70.4% of students choose a combination two elective subjects, while 17.4% choose three elective subjects.

2019 HKDSE subject combinations of school candidates
(elective subjects include Categories A, B and C subjects):
1. 4 core subjects + 1 elective subject (9.00%)
2. 4 core subjects + 2 elective subjects (70.4%)
3. 4 core subjects + 3 elective subjects (17.4%)
4. 4 core subjects + 4 elective subjects (0.20%)
5. Other (3.00%)
- Chinese Literature
- English Literature
- Chinese History
- Economics
- Geography
- History
- Biology
- Chemistry
- Physics
- Combined Science (combining two of the three science subjects, Physics, Chemistry and Biology) (withdrawn from 2024)
- Integrated Science (integrating all three science subjects, Physics, Chemistry and Biology) (withdrawn from 2024)
- Tourism and Hospitality Studies
- Business, Accounting and Financial Studies
- Design and Applied Technology
- Health Management and Social Care
- Technology and Living (previously known as Home Economics)
- Information and Communication Technology (ICT)
- Ethics and Religious Studies
- Music
- Visual Arts
- Physical Education

=== Category B: Applied Learning Subjects ===
Category B (ApL) subjects are offered by course providers, which are usually Higher Education Institutions. Assessments of these subjects are conducted by the course providers, and the results reported to the HKEAA for adjustment. They are mostly vocational or professional subjects.

Applied Learning Subjects may or may not be considered by tertiary institutions for admission, according to HKEAA, a reported level of "Attained" on the certificate is considered as equivalent to a Grade 2 in a Category A subject, and "Attained with Distinction" to Grade 3 or above. From 2018, "Attained with Distinction" has been further refined to "Attained with Distinction (I)" (equivalent to Grade 3) and "Attained with Distinction (II)" (equivalent to Grade 4 or above). However, the more prestigious universities in Hong Kong usually consider Category B subjects as mere 'Interest Groups' for admission purposes, believing them to be inferior to the traditional academic subjects in Category A.

Areas of study in Category B include:

- Creative Studies
- Media and Communication
- Business, Management and Law
- Services
- Applied Science
- Engineering and Production
- Applied Learning Chinese (for non-Chinese speaking students)

=== Category C: Other Language Subjects ===
These are language electives. They may be used to replace Chinese Language for university admissions for students whose first language is not Chinese, but it may not be used to replace English. It may also be chosen as an elective for native Chinese speaking students, in which case it will not serve as an alternative language for UG admission. In many cases, in lieu of a Category C subject, an IGCSE Chinese Language pass (or similar Chinese qualification) can also be accepted for admission to UG programmes for non-Chinese speaking students.

Up to 2024, Category C subjects use the papers of CAIE GCE AS-level language subjects. These are provided and marked by Cambridge Assessment International Education. Starting from 2025, Official language examinations taken within 2 years before the HKDSE examination could be reported in the certificate. N3 or above is required for Japanese. Grade 3 or above is required for Korean. A2 or above is required for the remaining language subjects.

- French
- German
- Japanese
- Spanish
- Hindi (Up to 2024)
- Urdu (Up to 2024, resuming from 2026)
- Korean (Starting from 2025)

Tertiary Institutions are not obliged to recognise results of Category B or C subjects, while Category C subjects are generally accepted due to them being also an AS-Level subject, Category B subjects, especially for the more prestigious institutions, are usually only considered for reference in cases where two potential students are equal in other aspects.

== School-based assessment ==
School-based Assessments (SBA) are conducted for the majority of subjects for school candidates, which notably includes three of the four core subjects, Chinese Language, English Language and Liberal Studies, with the exception of Mathematics. It reduces reliance on a one-off public examination as students' projects and assignments throughout senior secondary years are graded by their teachers. After HKEAA adjusts the grades, they are counted toward the HKDSE results on fixed weightings.

== Grading ==
For Category A subjects, the performance of candidates is categorised and released on a scale of seven levels indicated on the examination certificate. Level 5** being the highest and level 1 the lowest. Distinction levels 5** and 5* (read as "five-double-stars" and "five-star") are awarded to the two best-performing groups of candidates attaining level 5. Unclassified Level (UNCL) are given in cases of absence, cheating, or an attempt not reaching the standards of level 1.

Category A: New Senior Secondary Subjects

UCAS tariff points for HKDSE Examination:

- Level 5** (top 10% of level 5 achievers)=56
- Level 5* (top 30% of level 5 achievers)=52
- Level 5=48
- Level 4=32
- Level 3=16
- Level 2=N/A
- Level 1=N/A

The UCAS Tariff points attached to each subject level (excluding Mathematics) is as shown above, UCAS is the university admission system in United Kingdom.

Category B: Applied Learning Subjects

Subjects	Result	Comparing to HKDSE Category A results
Applied Learning Subjects (excluding ApL Chinese)	"Attained with Distinction (II)"	Level 4 or above
Applied Learning Subjects (excluding ApL Chinese)	"Attained with Distinction (I)"	Level 3
Applied Learning Subjects (excluding ApL Chinese)	"Attained"	Unknown
Applied Learning Chinese (for non-Chinese speaking students)	"Attained with Distinction"	Level 3 or above
Applied Learning Chinese (for non-Chinese speaking students)	"Attained"	Unknown

Note: Albeit Category B subjects are taught to standards designed to be comparable to Category A subjects, with reference to the form above, to date the majority of local universities however, do not consider Category B subjects for admission by JUPAS.

Category C: Other Language Subjects

These subjects are graded by CAIE, on grades "A" to "E" (with grade "E" being the lowest and grade "A" the highest). An achievement below grade “E” is called 'Ungraded', and is not recorded on the diploma awarded to candidate.

== Marking ==
In the criterion-referenced grading system, experts in relevant subject matters establish the marking standards for each level. Thereafter, level descriptors and examples are set and constantly reviewed based on syllabus objectives and statistical data, including exam statistics and candidate answer scripts. Gradings produced by a criterion-referenced system reflect a candidate's level of attainment in a particular subject instead of the rank order of the candidate in comparison to others.

Markers of HKDSE are mostly current teachers of secondary schools. They are appointed to different assessment centres to perform Onscreen Marking (OSM). Exam papers are first scanned into the database at scanning centres, and then distributed to the markers through computer.

== Top Scorers' Schools ==
As of 2026, there are only 46 schools that have ever produced top scorers in HKDSE.

Up to 2023, "Top Scorers" are candidates who obtained perfect scores of 5** in each of the four core subjects and three electives. Starting from 2024, "Top Scorers" are candidates who obtained perfect scores of 5** in each of the three core subjects and three electives, and achieved an "Attained" level in Citizenship and Social Development.

"Super Top Scorers" are Top Scorers who have also obtained an additional Level 5** in Extended Module (M1/M2) apart from a Level 5** in Mathematics Compulsory Part.

"Ultimate Top Scorers" are "Super Top Scorers" who have also obtained one more Level 5** in an elective.

Year	Total No. of Top Scorers	Name of School	No. of 5**	First time for the school to have a Top Scorer #	University Destination / Remarks
2012	6	Queen's College	7	#	HKU MBBS
2012	6	Queen's College	7		HKU Actuarial Science
2012	6	St. Mary's Canossian College	8	#	HKU BBA(Law) & LLB
2012	6	Pui Ching Middle School	8	#	HKU MBBS
2012	6	Sing Yin Secondary School	8	#	HKU BBA(Law) & LLB
2012	6	Po Leung Kuk No.1 W.H.Cheung College	8	#	HKU LLB Upgraded after Rechecking/Remarking
2013	9	Queen's College	7		HKU BBA(Law) & LLB
2013	9	Queen's College	7		HKU Actuarial Science
2013	9	True Light Girls' College	7	#	HKU MBBS
2013	9	HKFYG Lee Shau Kee College	7	#	HKU MBBS
2013	9	CCC Heep Woh College	7	#	CUHK Medicine - GPS
2013	9	La Salle College	7	#	HKU MBBS
2013	9	Ying Wa Girls' School	7	#	CUHK GBS
2013	9	Good Hope School	8	#	HKU BBA(Law) & LLB
2013	9	St. Paul's Co-Educational College	8	#	HKU LLB
2014	12	Queen's College	7		HKU MBBS
2014	12	Wah Yan College, Kowloon	7	#	HKU MBBS
2014	12	King's College	7	#	HKU MBBS
2014	12	St. Stephen's College	7	#	HKU BA in English
2014	12	St. Paul's Secondary School	7	#	CUHK Government and Public Administration transferred to Oxford University BA in PPE
2014	12	St. Paul's Secondary School	7		HKU LLB
2014	12	St. Marys Canossian College	7		HKU MBBS
2014	12	St. Paul's Co-Educational College	7		CUHK BA in Chinese
2014	12	St. Paul's Co-Educational College	7		HKU LLB
2014	12	St. Paul's Co-Educational College	8		Cambridge University BA in Economics
2014	12	Heep Yunn School	8	#	HKU MBBS
2014	12	Wa Ying College	8	#	HKU LLB
2015	12	Queen's College	7		HKU MBBS
2015	12	Queen's College	8		HKU MBBS The first candidate to obtain 17 * stars
2015	12	St. Marys Canossian College	7		HKU MBBS
2015	12	St. Marys Canossian College	7		HKU BSocSc in Psychology
2015	12	HKUGA College	7	#	HKU MBBS
2015	12	HKUGA College	7		HKU BBA(Law) & LLB
2015	12	HKTA Tang Hin Memorial Secondary School	7	#	HKU BSocSc (Government and Laws) & LLB
2015	12	Shun Tak Fraternal Association Leung Kau Kui College	7	#	HKU MBBS
2015	12	St. Paul's School (Lam Tin)	7	#	HKU Dental Surgery
2015	12	Diocesan Girls' School	7	#	HKU MBBS
2015	12	Diocesan Girls' School	7		HKU MBBS Upgraded after Rechecking/Remarking
2015	12	King's College	8		HKU MBBS
2016	5	Queen's College	7		HKU MBBS
2016	5	Diocesan Girls' School	7		CUHK Medicine - GPS
2016	5	Diocesan Girls' School	7		HKU Dental Surgery
2016	5	St. Paul's Co-educational College	7		HKU BBA(Law) & LLB
2016	5	Pui Ching Middle School	7		CUHK Pharmacy Upgraded after Rechecking/Remarking
2017	6	Queen's College	7		HKU MBBS
2017	6	St. Paul's Co-educational College	7		HKU MBBS
2017	6	St. Paul's Co-educational College	7		HKU MBBS
2017	6	Munsang College	7	#	HKU Dental Surgery
2017	6	Belilios Public School	7	#	HKU MBBS
2017	6	Diocesan Girls' School	8		CUHK Medicine - GPS
2018	11	Diocesan Girls' School	7		HKU MBBS
2018	11	Diocesan Girls' School	7		Oxford University BA in PPE
2018	11	Good Hope School	7		HKU BSocSc (Government and Laws) & LLB
2018	11	Tseung Kwan O Government Secondary School	7	#	HKU MBBS transferred to CityU Veterinary Medicine Upgraded after Rechecking/Remarking
2018	11	St. Paul's Co-educational College	7		CUHK GBS
2018	11	St. Paul's Co-educational College	7		HKU LLB
2018	11	St. Paul's Co-educational College	8		HKU BBA(Law) & LLB
2018	11	St. Paul's Co-educational College	8		HKU MBBS Upgraded after Rechecking/Remarking
2018	11	Queen's College	8		CUHK Medicine - GPS
2018	11	Diocesan Boys' School	8	#	HKU Dental Surgery
2018	11	La Salle College	9		HKU MBBS The first candidate to obtain 18 * stars
2019	12	Diocesan Girls' School	7		CUHK Medicine - GPS
2019	12	Diocesan Girls' School	8		Cambridge University BA in Economics
2019	12	La Salle College	7		CUHK Medicine - GPS
2019	12	La Salle College	7		CUHK Medicine - GPS
2019	12	La Salle College	8		CUHK Medicine - GPS
2019	12	St. Mark's School	7	#	CUHK Medicine - GPS
2019	12	Kwun Tong Maryknoll College	7	#	HKU Dental Surgery
2019	12	Pui Ching Middle School	7		CUHK Medicine - GPS
2019	12	St. Paul's College	8	#	HKU BBA(Law) & LLB
2019	12	Diocesan Boys' School	8		HKU MBBS
2019	12	St. Paul's Co-educational College	8		CUHK Medicine - GPS
2019	12	Queen's College	8		HKU MBBS
2020	7	Queen's College	7		HKU MBBS
2020	7	Wah Yan College Hong Kong	7	#	HKU MBBS
2020	7	Diocesan Girls' School	7		Cambridge University BA in HSPS
2020	7	Diocesan Girls' School	8		Oxford University BA in English Language and Literature
2020	7	St. Paul's Co-educational College	7		CUHK BSc in Cell and Molecular Biology
2020	7	St. Paul's Co-educational College	7		HKU MBBS
2020	7	St. Paul's Co-educational College	8		Cambridge University MEng
2021	7	Diocesan Girls' School	7		Cambridge University BA in Law
2021	7	Diocesan Girls' School	8		CUHK Medicine - GPS
2021	7	St. Stephen's Girls College	7	#	CUHK Medicine - GPS
2021	7	Ying Wa College	7	#	CUHK Medicine - GPS
2021	7	Queen Elizabeth School	7	#	CUHK Medicine - GPS
2021	7	St. Mary's Canossian College	8		HKU MBBS
2021	7	Po Leung Kuk Tang Yuk Tien College	8	#	HKU BSc Quantitative Finance
2022	11	Queen's College	7		CUHK Medicine - GPS
2022	11	Diocesan Girls' School	7		Cambridge University BA in HSPS
2022	11	La Salle College	7		CUHK Medicine - GPS
2022	11	King's College	7		CUHK Medicine - GPS
2022	11	S.K.H. Lam Woo Memorial Secondary School	7	#	Cambridge University BA in Natural Sciences Upgraded after Appeal Review
2022	11	New Territories Heung Yee Kuk Yuen Long District Secondary School	7	#	HKU-UCL Dual Degree Programme in Law Upgraded after Appeal Review
2022	11	Queen Elizabeth School	8		CUHK Medicine - GPS
2022	11	Heep Yunn School	8		CUHK Medicine - GPS
2022	11	Pui Ching Middle School	8		HKU MBBS
2022	11	Carmel Secondary School	8	#	CUHK BSc in Quantitative Finance and Risk Management Science
2022	11	Diocesan Boys' School	8		CUHK Medicine - GPS Upgraded after Rechecking/Remarking
2023	4	Good Hope School	7		HKU MBBS
2023	4	Queen's College	8		CUHK Medicine - GPS
2023	4	St. Paul's Co-educational College	8		Cambridge University BA in Natural Sciences
2023	4	St. Paul's Co-educational College	8		HKU MBBS
2024	11	Hong Kong Chinese Women’s Club College	6+A	#	CUHK Medicine
2024	11	La Salle College	6+A		CUHK Medicine
2024	11	La Salle College	7+A		HKU IBGM / imperial College London Economics Finance and Data Science
2024	11	Pui Ching Middle School	7+A		CUHK Medicine
2024	11	Diocesan Boys' School	7+A		CUHK Medicine
2024	11	Ying Wa Girls’ School	7+A		University of Aberdeen MBBS
2024	11	St. Joseph’s College	7+A	#	CUHK Medicine
2024	11	King’s College	7+A		HKU MBBS
2024	11	St. Paul's Co-educational College	7+A		HKU MBBS
2024	11	St. Paul's Co-educational College	7+A		HKUST Global Business
2024	11	New Territories Heung Yee Kuk Yuen Long District Secondary School	7+A		CUHK Medicine Upgraded after Appeal Review
2025	17	Heep Yunn School	6+A		CUHK Medicine - GPS
2025	17	Munsang College	6+A		CityU Veterinary Medicine
2025	17	Hong Kong Taoist Association Tang Hin Memorial Secondary School	6+A		CUHK Medicine - GPS
2025	17	Cheung Chuk Shan College	6+A	#	Cambridge University BA in Natural Sciences
2025	17	True Light School of Hong Kong	6+A	#	LSE BSc Environment and Sustainable Development
2025	17	Queen's College	7+A		HKU MBBS
2025	17	King's College	7+A		HKU MBBS
2025	17	La Salle College	7+A		CUHK Medicine - GPS
2025	17	Diocesan Girls' School	7+A		HKU MBBS
2025	17	Wa Ying College	7+A		CUHK Medicine - GPS
2025	17	Carmel Pak U Secondary School	7+A	#	
2025	17	Po Leung Kuk Tang Yuk Tien College	7+A		CUHK Medicine - GPS
2025	17	St. Paul's Co-educational College	6+A		HKU MBBS Upgraded after Rechecking/Remarking
2025	17	St. Paul's Co-educational College	7+A		CUHK Medicine - GPS
2025	17	St. Paul's Co-educational College	7+A		Cambridge University BA in Natural Sciences
2025	17	St. Paul's Co-educational College	7+A		Cambridge University BA in Economics
2025	17	Hong Kong Chinese Women's Club College	8+A		CUHK Medicine - GPS
2026	25	Diocesan Girls' School	6+A		Oxford University BA in Computer Science
2026	25	Diocesan Girls' School	6+A		
2026	25	St Mary's Canossian College	6+A		
2026	25	Wah Yan College Hong Kong	6+A		
2026	25	Po Leung Kuk Tang Yuk Tien College	6+A		
2026	25	Sha Tin Tsung Tsin Secondary School	6+A	#	
2026	25	Hong Kong Baptist University Affiliated School Wong Kam Fai Secondary and Primary School	6+A	#	CUHK Medicine - GPS
2026	25	Queen's College	6+A		CUHK Medicine - GPS
2026	25	Queen's College	6+A		HKU MBBS
2026	25	Queen's College	7+A		HKU MBBS
2026	25	La Salle College	6+A		
2026	25	La Salle College	7+A		
2026	25	Pui Ching Middle School	6+A		
2026	25	Pui Ching Middle School	7+A		
2026	25	St Paul's Co-educational College	6+A		
2026	25	St Paul's Co-educational College	6+A		
2026	25	St Paul's Co-educational College	7+A		
2026	25	St Paul's Co-educational College	7+A		
2026	25	St Paul's Co-educational College	7+A		
2026	25	Heep Yunn School	7+A		CUHK Medicine - GPS
2026	25	Ying Wa Girls' School	7+A		
2026	25	St Paul's College	7+A		
2026	25	King's College	7+A		
2026	25	Po Leung Kuk Laws Foundation College	7+A	#	CUHK Medicine - GPS
2026	25	New Territories Heung Yee Kuk Yuen Long District Secondary School	7+A		HKU MBBS Upgraded after Rechecking/Remarking

== Admission to local universities ==
The HKDSE is designed for local secondary school students in Hong Kong to measure their achievement and to enable them to gain admission to local universities through the unified Joint University Programmes Admissions System (JUPAS).

International qualifications, like IB Diploma, IGCSE, GCE A-levels and IALs, OSSD, and SAT/AP, on the other hand, are more often taken by private, DSS (Directly Subsidised, comparable to independent schools in other countries) or international school students. These international qualifications are becoming more popular in Hong Kong, due to the perceived difference in difficulty and grading between HKDSE and the international qualifications, leading to the perception in some parents and students that it is comparatively easier for a student to gain entrance to local universities with an international school leaving qualification. In addition, HKDSE holders applying through JUPAS must have results from at least 5 subjects, including the Compulsory Subject of Chinese Language, metaphorically referred to by students as 'the paper of death' due to its extensive coverage of Classical Chinese literatures written in a completely different writing system than Modern Standard Chinese; while international qualifications like IGCSE/A-level and IBD have more flexibility in the choice of subject and additional language for students.

Due to these differences and the perception of an advantage that international qualifications have over HKDSE in university admission, there has been a considerable amount of concern over the emergence of a bipartite education system, based on wealth instead of merit.

== Impact on schools ==
One notable impact on schools in Hong Kong is the discontinued need for sixth form colleges due to the cancellation of HKALE and upper sixth. Nevertheless, some of these colleges, such as PLK Vicwood KT Chong Sixth Form College, remain in operation as senior secondary schools.

== Criticism ==
=== Unbalanced focus ===
The HKDSE is criticised for placing too much emphasis on the four core subjects, causing some students to neglect the elective subjects. Tsui Lap-chee, then president of the University of Hong Kong at the introduction of HKDSE, commented: "The Education Bureau demands universities [to screen pupils by] setting the so-called 3322 as minimum entry requirement for undergraduate programmes — aka a minimal of grade 3 in Chinese and English Languages, and a minimal of grade 2 in Mathematics and Liberal Studies. [It is] insufficient for studying in universities." He proposed a minimal grade requirement for two elective subjects, which the Education Bureau rejected. He also mentioned that many students do not study the optional extended modules for Mathematics, leaving them lacking the advanced mathematics knowledge needed for science and engineering studies; it is very difficult for them to make this up in their undergraduate courses.

=== Severely weakened higher mathematics education ===
In the former secondary education system, students who were good at mathematics could take Additional Mathematics in the HKCEE, and Pure Mathematics and Applied Mathematics in the HKALE, with syllabi in higher mathematics that were much more demanding than those in neighbouring regions such as mainland China and Taiwan. These subjects were treated as stand-alone subjects; they had equal teaching time as other subjects, and their grades were counted separately from the general Mathematics in HKCEE in university admission. The HKALE Pure Mathematics used to be required for application to undergraduate programmes in mathematics, physics and engineering, so that students would have a sufficient foundation in higher mathematics needed for these programmes.

In the HKDSE, however, education in higher mathematics is reduced to part of Mathematics in the form of two extended modules. The extended modules do not have the status of separated elective subjects; they are only given half as much teaching time as an elective subject, and their syllabi are drastically axed. Classes for the extended modules are often scheduled outside of regular school hours. Also, many university programmes, including medicine and law, which are regarded as "elite programmes" in Hong Kong, only consider the extended modules as a part of the core Mathematics subject for admission, meaning that applicants will receive extra credits only if they get higher grade in an extended module than in the easier compulsory part. These lead to a sharp decline of students taking higher mathematics in secondary schools; only 14% of students took the extended modules in 2016, whereas in the past 25% of students had taken the HKCEE Additional Mathematics. The science and engineering departments in universities are faced with struggling students who did not learn any calculus.

The world-renowned mathematician Shing-tung Yau has lambasted Hong Kong education for neglecting calculus, which hampers Hong Kong's development in mathematics and technology and diminishes Hong Kong's competitiveness in STEM fields. The Hong Kong Academy of Sciences has called for proper recognition of higher mathematics education, highlighting the fact that Hong Kong has far lower proportion of students taking higher mathematics than neighbouring countries and regions. The Faculty of Engineering of the Chinese University of Hong Kong has to lower its admission requirements due to weak basics in mathematics of prospective students, and some engineering professors have proposed a reform by scrapping the extended modules and introducing a proper subject in higher mathematics that would be set at the standard of the former HKALE Pure Mathematics and would be required for students applying to engineering. The proposal was put forward by Legislator Michael Tien to the then Secretary for Education Yeung Yun-hung, which he did not respond directly.

=== Hindrance to admission ===
Since the launch of the HKDSE, the Chinese language paper is often dubbed the "paper of death" (Chinese: 死亡之卷). Some have the opinion that the high expectation is well-founded since it is the main language used in daily life in Hong Kong, but every year nearly half of all candidates fail the subject. They hence lose the chance to gain entrance to a university because of the obligatory "3322" requirement, even though tertiary education in Hong Kong is delivered in English. “3322” refers to level 3 for Chinese Language and English Language and level 2 for Mathematics Compulsory Part and Liberal Studies, compared to the past when language subjects were not compulsory at advanced level. It is also reported that some of the authors of passages employed in the Chinese papers themselves found the questions in the paper difficult or impossible to answer. Elaine Yau of SCMP commented that the exam results are "proving [HKDSE as] a major hindrance to admission".

Moreover, it is reported that the HKDSE is causing chronic stress in students.

=== 2020 arrangements due to the COVID-19 outbreak ===
The spread of COVID-19 in Hong Kong caused the Education Bureau (EDB) and HKEAA to remodel the 2020 HKDSE. At a press conference held on 6 February announcing the alternative plans, the Secretary for Education Kevin Yeung said that all oral and practical examinations to be held before 27 March would be postponed. He went on further to mention two different options then considered by the Bureau and the HKEAA. One of them was that written exams would take place on 27 March as scheduled, whereas physical education, music practicals and Chinese speakings be postponed to May. Option two was that all examinations would be postponed by four weeks, as well as cancelling all oral examinations. At the end of February, the bureau announced that option one would be adopted where HKDSE would be held as scheduled on 27 March and Chinese oral exams would be postponed to 18 May. The result releasing date would also be postponed to 15 July. Some measures were made by the Bureau to prevent the chance of virus transmission, such as providing candidates with face masks and checking their body temperature. For those who could not attend HKDSE due to health conditions, their final grade of the subject can be determined based on school performance, but the maximum grade they can obtain would be level 5. In mid-March, after a spike in COVID-19 cases reported in Hong Kong, the secretary announced that the HKDSE would be postponed by a month to 27 April, as in the previously discussed option 2.

Candidates expressed dissatisfaction over the new arrangements, demanding a cancellation of 2020 HKDSE. Some thought that with such a large number of candidates staying in a packed area for examination, the possibility of virus transmission would be high. Some also thought that the EDB should have made the call to postpone the exam earlier instead of just less than 2 weeks before the official exam date, which caused confusion and inconvenience to everyone concerned. In an interview with Hong Kong Free Press, a candidate hoped that the bureau would be more transparent in their decision-making process in the future, as the uncertainty surrounding the new arrangement had caused more burden to candidates and made them more stressed about the public exam.

=== 2020 HKDSE History exam controversy ===
In May, over 5,000 students took the HKDSE History exam. The exam is divided into two papers, with the first paper consisting of four compulsory Data-Based Question and the second paper requiring the candidate to choose to attempt two out of the seven essay questions. Among the four questions in Paper 1, Question 2 is set on the topic of Sino-Japanese relations during the first half of the 20th century. In part (c) of the question, which is also the third and the last sub-question, requires candidates to answer "Whether Japan did more good than harm to China between 1900 and 1945." based on the source provided and their own historical knowledge. A day after the exam, the EDB, the Hong Kong government officials, and major pro-establishment figures and legislators slammed the question for being "biased", "insensitive to the war crime victims who suffered from atrocities committed by the Japanese Army during Sino-Japanese War", and "hurting the pride and dignity of the 1.4 billion Chinese people". Hence, the government ordered the invalidation of the question.

With the government intervention in the exam system, many candidates expressed their anger towards the government that the removal of the controversial question would unfairly affect their performance, and may also affect their admission into the local universities. A week later, the question was confirmed to be invalidated. Subsequently, a student group filed a judicial review to challenge the HKEAA decision to invalidate the question.

Many pro-democracy figures believed the government intervention on the examination system reflected the Central government's growing influence in Hong Kong's local affairs. Many teachers from the pro-democracy HKPTU expressed their concern about the eroding academic freedom. On the other hand, pro-establishment figures believed that the local education system was "toxic" and "brainwashing" to promote local young people to become more rebellious against the Central and SAR government. In view of this problem, the pro-establishment figures called for the education system to be reformed and remove any elements of colonialism in the education system that have existed over the past 23 years.

== See also ==
- Hong Kong Certificate of Education Examination
- Hong Kong Advanced Level Examination
- Matriculation examination
