= Hong Kong Certificate of Education Examination =

Former school examination in Hong Kong

- Traditional Chinese: 香港中學會考
- Simplified Chinese: 香港中学会考
Transcriptions
Standard Mandarin
- Hanyu Pinyin: Xiānggǎng Zhōngxué Huìkǎo
Yue: Cantonese
- Jyutping: hoeng1 gong2 zung1 hok6 wui6 haau2

The Hong Kong Certificate of Education Examination (HKCEE, 香港中學會考, Hong Kong School Certificate Examination, HKSCE) was a standardised examination between 1974 and 2011 after most local students' five-year secondary education, conducted by the Hong Kong Examinations and Assessment Authority (HKEAA), awarding the Hong Kong Certificate of Education secondary school leaving qualification. The examination has been discontinued in 2012 and its roles are now replaced by the Hong Kong Diploma of Secondary Education as part of educational reforms in Hong Kong. It was considered equivalent to the United Kingdom's GCSE.

== Overview ==
Students usually took the HKCEE at the end of their five-year period of secondary school in Hong Kong; it was compulsory for students who wanted to pursue further education, but some students took individual examinations to increase their chance of continuing their study or to fulfil certain requirements in tertiary education programs. The final year in which school candidates were accepted was 2010. There were 127,162 candidates entered for the examination, 90,063 of them school candidates and 37,099 private candidates.

The HKCEE was conducted from late February to June, but major subjects were taken between mid-April and May, after the major subjects examination in the Hong Kong Advanced Level Examination were completed, by the Hong Kong Examinations and Assessment Authority (HKEAA). Oral examinations were conducted in late May to early July.

Examination results were released in early August, traditionally on the Wednesday after the first-round admission of the Joint University Programmes Admissions System had been released. There were 39 subjects available in the HKCEE. Most day-school candidates took 6 to 8 subjects in the HKCEE, with 10 being the upper limit. Apart from Chinese and English, which were taken by almost every school candidate, and language-specific subjects (French, Chinese History (Chinese only), Buddhist Studies (Chinese only), Literature in English (English only), Putonghua (Chinese only) and Word Processing and Business Communication (English only), all subjects could be taken in either Chinese or English. The same standards were applied in marking and grading regardless of the choice of language, and the language medium was not recorded on the results notices or certificates. It was, however, recorded on admission forms.

== Purpose ==
After sitting the HKCEE and having their examination results announced, candidates could apply for a place in sixth form in local schools in Hong Kong. Moreover, to qualify for the Hong Kong Advanced Level Examination (HKALE), students had to pass certain requirements of HKCEE as a prerequisite. The Joint University Programmes Admissions System (JUPAS), including the EAS system under JUPAS, also considered students' HKCEE results as a requirement and as a decisive factor of admission in the admission processes. Thus, students' results in HKCEE affected their application to sixth form but also directly affected the chance of entering the universities after seventh form, which was commonly ignored by students until they entered sixth form. In JUPAS, most admissions programs gave HKCEE results about a 10–30% weight, and some as much as 50%; the HKALE results provided the other 50%. Thus, HKCEE was the initial stage of University Entrance Examination.

The HKCEE was fully recognised by other countries including New Zealand, Australia, the UK, the US and many other major countries. It was equivalent to Year 11 in Australia and in the UK.

For comparison, the Mathematics syllabus of HKCEE was equivalent to New Zealand's National Certificate of Educational Achievement Level 2 Mathematics at Form 6 (Year 12) level (excluding Calculus) rather than NCEA Level 1 or its predecessor the School Certificate examination, sat by the country's Form 5 (Year 11) students.

Additional Mathematics in the HKCEE was more advanced than NCEA Level 3 Mathematics with Calculus, sat by Form 7 (Year 13) students in New Zealand to gain university entrance in science and engineering. HKCEE's Additional Mathematics was also recognised by most of the programs in Hong Kong's universities as equivalent to HKALE Pure Mathematics.

For the examination questions on the same topics, those in HKCEE tended to be loaded with unclear wordings and difficult manipulations, compared with their NCEA counterparts.

In other subjects, such as the sciences like Chemistry and Physics, the syllabus covered in HKCEE was similar to that of the SAT Subject Tests sat in Grade 12, but it was arguably easier to obtain a score of 760 on the SAT Subject Tests than to obtain a grade of A in the HKCEE examination although Grade 12 was theoretically equivalent to Form 6 under the Hong Kong school system.

== Grading and UK equivalence ==
The results of the HKCEE are expressed in terms of seven grades A – U (or 5*-1 and U for Chinese and English) other than French.

Grade	Point (s)	Recognition	Nickname
A (5*)	5	Distinction or IGCSE A*	Rocket (Shape), Distinction, Tincted (from Dis'tinct'ion)
B (5)	4	Credit or IGCSE A* (A for Chinese and English)	Big Cred (previously Certificate's B, C was counted as 'Credit')
C (4)	3	Credit or IGCSE A (B for Chinese and English)	Small Cred (at the same as B), Helmet (Shape)
D (3)	2	Pass or IGCSE B (C for Chinese and English)	Big belly, Bald (for the shape), Dog (Alphabet D)
E (2)	1	Minimum requirement for employment purposes, a pass in HKCEE or IGCSE C/D (D for Chinese and English)	Comb, fork (The shape), pass (The minimum pass result)
F (1)	0	IGCSE D, E, F, G	Machine gun (shape), Fat (Chinese idiom meaning "failed"), fail
U (UNCL)	0	Unclassified, a grade lower than G	UNCLE (the short form), holding a bowl (Shape and holding a bowl is beggar's mark. It means they will have no future and must be beggars.)

In the past, there were two other grades below UNCL: G and H. They were called "Grenade" and "Ladder".

Results below grade 'F' are designated as unclassified ("UNCL"), assigned either when candidates hand in unanswered or unintelligible paper (s), or when candidates are assumed to have cheated. Candidates not taking the exam are designated as Absent ('ABS') for that subject.

Before 2002 grades A – F were each divided into two "fine grades", making the original number of grades available twelve, from A (01) to F (12). The fine grades in both HKCEE and HKALE were lifted in 2002, as they were accused of being discriminatory to students.

Most of the results are graded "on the curve" but at the same time a cutoff score for each grade is also used. Obtaining an A is very difficult, especially for languages in the past system, where only about 1.5–3% of students received A's. On average, only the top 3–4% in each subject can get an A. The cutoff scores vary greatly from subject to subject and from year to year. To give a clearer picture, for Chinese, A-grades are sometimes given for candidates having scored 70 or above, while for Mathematics, an A invariably translates to a score in excess of 90. The cutoff scores are not released by the HKEAA publicly; the information is only available to teachers.

=== New grading system ===
Since 2007, as a stepping-stone towards the grading system HKDSE that will be introduced in 2010, a new grading system was introduced to the exams in the subjects of Chinese and English. Under the new system There are seven grades: five numerical grades from 1–5, where 1 is the lowest and 5 is the highest, and two other grades, "5*" and "UNCL", for students with particularly outstanding and poor performance respectively. The traditional "on-the-curve" system was not used other than to distinguish between the 5*'s and the 5's.

The point system was in chaos in its first year of implementation since level 2, which is the passing line in HKEAA, counts as two points in some schools and the HKEAA, but counts as one point in EMB and most schools. This counting process not only confused Form 5 students, but also some Form 6 students who repeated the exam to obtain better Language results for JUPAS admissions. The problems with the points system caused changes in the method for calculating points in HKEAA in the following years.

Since the two syllabi in English were merged into one along with the new system, some schools were worried that the level of English is insufficient for the HKALE as they expect HKEAA will decrease the difficulty to allow students who previously studied in Syllabus A (mainly from some non-EMI schools) to pass more easily. This resulted in some schools rejecting students who had a level 2 in English.

The system will be fully utilised in all major subjects in the HKDSE.

=== Further studies ===
Students' results in HKCEE and their conduct (behavior at school which is usually shown in the school's internal report) at school are the main admission factors in Secondary 6, which is the main stream for university admission. In EMB's official admission processes, students with 4 passed subjects, or 3 passes with 5 marks (both excluding language subjects) is the minimum requirement. Students with 14 marks above, including passes in English and one other Language subject have an advantage as they can be admitted from the first stage of Form 6 admissions. Students scoring 30 marks (the maximum) with L4/C in two designated language subjects (one of which must be English) in their first attempt will be permitted to apply to the Direct Entry for the 3 major Universities in Hong Kong (see below).

Requirements of sitting in HKALE are independent from Form 6 admissions since they are managed by separate organisations. A student who passes all the minimum requirements for sitting in HKALE also meets all the requirements for applying for Form 6, but not vice versa. Schools may admit a student who failed in language subjects, providing that the school would bear the risk that he/she may not pass again in the following year, not allowing them to sit for the HKALE.

For admissions to the four-year Higher Diploma programs in HKIVE and degrees in The University of Hong Kong, Chinese University of Hong Kong, and the University of Science and Technology, the best 7 subjects, instead of 6, are counted. In other cases, the best 5 or 6 subjects are counted. The Chinese University of Hong Kong, in addition, did not accept "combined certificates" (results obtained in more than two examinations) and must be fulfilled in a single attempt (usually the first one).

=== International recognition ===
HKEAA has been working closely with international agencies, overseas universities and colleges to promote recognition of HKEAA examinations. Standards of performance in the HKCEE and HKALE have for many years been benchmarked against standards in comparable subjects at British GCE O-Level and A/AS-Level. In the case of performance in the English Language, studies have been conducted to link standards of performance in HKCEE English Language (Syllabus B) and HKALE Use of English to standards in IELTS and TOEFL.

Starting in 2007, HKCEE standards-referenced reporting was adopted in Chinese language and English language subjects. The results in the two subjects have also been benchmarked against International General Certificate of Secondary Education (IGCSE) results.

The Hong Kong Diploma for Secondary Education Examination (HKDSE) was conducted for the first time in 2012. To secure appropriate recognition of HKDSE qualifications, the HKEAA had held discussions with international agencies including University of Cambridge International Examinations (CIE), National Academic Recognition Information Centre (NARIC), Universities and Colleges Admissions Service (UCAS) in the UK and the Australian Education International (AEI) in Australia to conduct benchmarking and comparability research on HKDSE.

Although HKEAA examinations have been widely accepted, some universities have set particular criteria for the admission of overseas students. For instance, the University of Cambridge in the UK has set out admission requirements for underage or minor candidates concerning guardianship arrangements.

In cases where candidates wish to further their studies abroad, they may be required to take as one of the basic requirements certain unified examinations conducted by the examination authorities of that particular country. These include, for example, the National Higher Education Entrance Examination for universities in mainland China and the SAT for the United States.

UK NARIC is the UK's National Agency for the UK Government. They are the official information provider on information on wide-ranging international qualifications and skills attained from outside the UK.

Although NARIC is a National Agency for the UK Government, the institutions of higher education may make their own decision on what foreign qualifications or study they will accept, and UK NARIC has only an advisory role.

The two new HKCEE language subjects have been benchmarked against the International General Certificate of Secondary Education (IGCSE) by the Cambridge Assessment. The HKCEE results in Chinese Language and English Language are recognised as equivalent to the IGCSE results as follows:

HKCEE	IGCSE
5*	A*
5	A
4	B
3	C

== Marking schemes ==
While the HKEAA have been publishing booklets of past examination papers of each subject at an affordable price, the marking schemes (i.e. official detailed solutions) of past examinations were never readily available to the public. The official argument from the HKEAA for not publishing these marking schemes was that it might be "pedagogically unsound" and would encourage "rote memorisation" behaviour from students. Nevertheless, students were often able to obtain these "restricted documents" by taking classes at cram schools. Hence, the policy of the HKEAA indirectly denied less privileged students from gaining access to information pertaining to how examination papers are scored. This might have created a socio-economic bias in the ability of students to obtain good results in the HKCEE. Moreover, according to media reports, some so-called "star tutors" managed to earn more than HK$7 million per annum (~US$900,000), leading some to speculate that the HKEAA's policy had indirectly transferred large amounts of wealth to these cram schools.

To deal with this problem, the HKEAA started to release the marking schemes together with the year's examination papers in 2003.

== HKSAR Government Scholarship ==
The HKSAR Government Scholarship is a prestigious award formerly associated with the HKCEE Examination. The top 30–40 candidates in the HKCEE Examination received this scholarship each year. Counterintuitively, many 10A students fail to receive this award. This apparent paradox is mainly due to the methodology in which the HKSAR Government Scholarship is awarded. Rather than calculating the number of A's each student has, the HKSAR Government Scholarship is awarded on the basis of the highest total in raw scores attained in the seven best subjects of each student. Consequently, many 9A, 8A, and even 7A students go on to win this award while 10A students do not. This has been a major source of complaint from parents of 10A students who felt cheated from this coveted prize.

== Early Admissions Scheme ==
The Early Admissions Scheme (or simply "EAS"), a subsystem of the Joint University Programmes Admissions System (JUPAS) since 2003, allowed school Candidates with 6 or more "A"s (Distinctions) on their first attempt of the HKCEE, with level 4 or above in English Language, and also level 4 or above in Chinese Language or "C" or above in French or Putonghua to apply for the University of Hong Kong, Chinese University of Hong Kong, or the Hong Kong University of Science and Technology institutions after their Secondary 6 study, without the need to sit for the HKALE.

Each year about 400–600 students entered the scheme via this subsystem in JUPAS. A selection procedure exists in this scheme but, unlike the mainstream scheme of JUPAS, the students are guaranteed a firm offer in EAS regardless of the number of applicants in EAS. Students who met the EAS requirements do not need to apply for this scheme to enter the aforementioned universities (though most of them will), but they need to take part in the HKALE and participate in the mainstream scheme if they did not participate and want to pursue their studies in Hong Kong.

There are also rare cases where students who were eligible for the EAS are given independent offers by universities outside EAS.

== List of subjects ==
Subjects in bold are the major examination subjects (which over 20% of students sit); most secondary schools will provide these curricula for students.

- Accommodation and Catering Services ^{2}
- **Additional Mathematics**
- **Biology**
- Buddhist Studies ^{1}
- **Chemistry**
- **Chinese History**
- **Chinese Language**
- Chinese Literature
- **Commerce**
- **Computer and Information Technology**
- Design and Technology ^{5}
- Design and Technology (Alternative Syllabus) ^{5}
- Economic and Public Affairs ^{3}
- **Economics ^{3}**
- Electronics and Electricity
- **English Language**
- Fashion and Clothing ^{4}
- French
- **Geography**
- Government and Public Affairs
- Graphical Communication
- **History**
- Home Economics (Dress and Design) ^{4}
- Home Economics (Food, Home and Family) ^{2}
- Integrated Humanities
- Literature in English
- **Mathematics**
- Music
- Physical Education
- **Physics**
- **Principles of Accounts**
- Putonghua
- Religious Studies ^{1}
- Science and Technology
- Social Studies
- Technological Studies ^{5}
- Travel and Tourism
- Visual Art
- Word Processing and Business Communication (English)
1. Buddhist Studies may not be taken with Religious studies; Religious Studies are available in Protestant and Catholic versions on the same paper, which varies in the citations of the Bible. Chapters that only appear in the Catholic version are not in the Syllabus. Both subjects are open-booked.
2. Accommodation and Catering Services may not be taken with Home Economics (Food, Home and Family)
3. Economics may not be taken with Economic and Public Affairs
4. Home Economics (Dress and Design) may not be taken with Fashion and Clothing
5. Design and Technology may not be taken with Design and Technology (Alternative Syllabus) or Technological Studies

=== Cancelled and renamed subjects ===
The year in parentheses is the last year of examination.

- Woodwork (1992)
- German (2001)
- Typewriting (2002)
- Metalwork (2004)
- Art (2005) (restructured as Visual Arts)
- Computer Studies (2005), Information Technology (2005) (merged into Computer and Information Technology)
- Textiles (2007)
- Technical Drawing (2007)
- Ceramics (2007)
- Human Biology (2007) (Was an alternate syllabus for Biology)
- Engineering Science (2007) (Was an alternate syllabus for Physics)

== Planned developments ==
The Authority was gradually implementing school-based assessment to all subjects, to reduce stress on students due to studying for exams. Starting from 2006, two subjects—Chinese History and History—had been implemented with the school-based assessment, replacing the previous multiple choice paper in public examinations.

In 2007, the curricula for Chinese and English were revised. The two subjects were no longer graded along the normal distribution curve but rather by criteria referencing (with the exception of the highest grade, the 5*). Numerical levels were used instead of the traditional letter grades.

The proposed revisions specific to Chinese included:

- The removal of the 26 selected essays, excerpts from the classics, poems and ancient lyrics in the original curriculum, replacing them with a selection of reading materials by the teachers.
- Independent reading comprehension and writing papers.
- The addition of a listening comprehension examination.
- The addition of a speaking (oral) examination.
- The addition of a paper testing integrated skills.
- The addition of a school-based assessment (SBA) scheme that accounts for 20% of the exam mark.

The proposed revisions specific to English included:

- The abolishment of two separate syllabi. Before 2007, two syllabi coexisted. Syllabus B was an O-level course and Syllabus A was easier but considered inferior. For HKEAA/EMB's view, grades attained on syllabus A were considered to be inferior to grades attained on syllabus B (e.g. a C on syllabus A was equivalent to an E on syllabus B), except in Form 6 admission and HKALE requirements in which the two syllabi were considered the same.
  - However, many universities and secondary schools claimed that the gap should have been larger. According to the report by HKEAA comparing the student's Use of English in HKALE with their previous result in HKCEE English, the passing rate of Use of English for which candidates received a C on syllabus A is far lower than that of candidates who received an E in syllabus B.
- The abolishment of the testing of grammar and language usage which was once part of the old reading comprehension and usage paper. (Grammar will be tested alongside comprehension in the same section)
- A refined writing paper, now requiring two separate pieces of writing, one guided, one independent and more open-ended.
- A refined reading comprehension paper, with questions requiring written answers instead of the old format in which every question was a multiple choice question.
- A refined speaking skills paper, requiring more independent thinking than the previous routinised paper.
- The addition of a school-based assessment scheme that accounts for 15% of the exam mark.

HKEAA had also announced that candidates who sat in the 2006 exam who wished to retake Chinese or English subjects were to take the new syllabi. Concerns were raised about whether or not those candidates, who were used to the old syllabi, could adapt to the structure of the new syllabi in nearly half a year.

== Discontinuation ==
Owing to the transition from the seven-year curriculum (five years of secondary and two years of sixth form / matriculation) to a six-year curriculum of secondary education, the HKCEE and the HKALE were discontinued from 2012 and 2014 respectively and replaced with a new examination, the Hong Kong Diploma of Secondary Education Examination (HKDSE).

== Controversies ==
=== 1997 theft of examination papers and marking schemes by HKEA senior officer ===
Several examiners reported to the HKEA that a candidate scored almost full marks in almost every paper he sat and his answers were identical to those in the marking schemes and even included the typing mistakes. The HKEA suspected that someone had improperly obtained the question papers and marking schemes in advance of the examinations. The case was referred to the ICAC for investigation. The ICAC found that the candidate had been an under-achiever at school and was not expected to get high grades. Further investigations revealed that he was the son of Mak Cheung Wah, then an assistant senior subject panel of the HKEA. Mak stole his colleagues' keys and reproduced them to enable him to open the safe deposits to obtain and photocopy question papers and marking schemes in every subject for his son to read prior to the examinations. Mak's son memorised the answers and wrote them on the answer scripts to score high marks. The ICAC only managed to solve the case and arrested the pair moments before the release of the results. Mak pleaded guilty to allowing unauthorised persons to have access to confidential examination documents. He was ordered by the Eastern Magistrates' Court to do 220 hours of community service. He was also dismissed by the HKEA and lost his entitlement to pension amounted to HK$720,000. His son was disqualified by the HKEA and his grades were annulled. Since then, the HKEA and the ICAC reviewed and revised the security arrangements of examination documents.

=== 2005 English Language (Syllabus B) grading error ===
In 2005, the oral component of the Syllabus B English language examination was incorrectly added to the total score because of a recent upgrade to the HKEAA computer system, and the supervisor in charge failed to double-check the results. Subsequently, many candidates received an incorrect total score, which resulted in an incorrect final grade for the subject. The problem was so severe that some students wrongfully received an F grade (the second-lowest grade) when they were supposed to receive an A (the highest grade) in the oral section. Since the final English mark is calculated by averaging the marks in the oral, reading comprehension, listening, and writing sections, having an F in oral would have seriously affected the final English mark if the candidate did well in other components.

In an attempt to mitigate the situation, the HKEAA publicly apologised and offered free rechecks on the oral component of the English language subject for all candidates. Candidates who would have had a higher score if the error had not occurred received an upgrade. In total, the error affected 670 candidates, and 422 candidates had their oral component mark upgraded while 248 had their overall English subject grade upgraded. The cascade reaction affected 233 candidates who were eligible for sixth form.

However, the mistake was discovered far too late. It was discovered when the admissions process was almost over. Since some candidates were unable to find a school for their matriculate education because they received an incorrect grade, the Education and Manpower Bureau was forced to increase the school quotas for some schools to accommodate the affected students. HKEAA chairman Irving Koo assured the students that their education would not be affected by the error.

=== 2005 English Language (Syllabus B) incident ===
A proofreading exercise in Paper 2 of the HKCEE English Language (Syllabus B) quoted a message that was adapted from an online forum. Some students flamed on that forum in anger after the exam. That caused the HKEAA to hold several internal meetings banning the use of messages from the online forum.

=== 2006 English Language (Syllabus B) paper 2 incident ===
The HKCEE English Language (Syllabus B) 2006, the last year for the syllabus, was administered on 4 May 2006. Paper 2, Reading Comprehension and Usage, had some candidates complained that the HKEAA, in providing all of the study sources via the Internet, created the potential for candidates to access the solutions with electronic devices such as personal digital assistants and cellphones while they were in the toilet. The rumour was first spread on local forums and Young-M. The incident generated widespread public furore.

Numerous discussions were initiated on local forums. Candidates sitting for the paper demanded a retake of the paper and an apology from the HKEAA. Some candidates collaborated with political parties to hold protests against the HKEAA's decision to not readminister the paper. A protest (Cantonese) was proposed for 31 May or 1 July.

On a local forum, a candidate threatened to sue the HKEAA by saying that justice needed to be defended. More than 100 complaints were received by the HKEAA regarding the incident.

The actual articles used in the exam:

- (Archived from the original on 29 August 2007), an article on the Para Para scene in Hong Kong, published by USA Today on 31 August 2001.
- (Archived from the original on 13 February 2007), a website about cyberbullying, had numerous grammatical and structural mistakes.

=== 2007 Chinese Language paper 2 incident ===
In 2007 HKCEE Chinese Language Paper 2 (Writing), Question 2 'Lemon Tea' was suspected to be leaked beforehand since a tutor, Siu Yuen from King's Glory Education Centre gave his students a sample article of a similar title, 'Iced Lemon Tea', well before the exam. That led to assumption that the tutor had knowledge of the question in the actual exam.

Two students lodged a complaint to the HKEAA. A spokesperson of the HKEAA stated that copying by candidates will result in no marks given to the plagiarised parts.

=== 2007 English Language questions leakage incident ===
Before the examination date of English Language Papers in 2007, "Mr. Ken", one of the well-known tutors at the Modern Education Centre in Hong Kong, called his students back to the tutorial centre for a few days before the test to review some material on fashion. It was later found that the actual test had some of the same topics and even some identical questions, fuelling worries of a possible leakage.

=== 2008 Chinese Language incident ===
Controversies were in two papers: paper 1, comprehension, and paper 5, integrated skills.

In paper 1, the format in previous years was that two passages were supplied, one in Vernacular Chinese and one in Classical Chinese, and candidates were required to answer questions mainly in words. In 2008, however, the second passage was a Chinese poem instead. Also, half of the total scores were from multiple choice questions, and in some questions, choices were said to be difficult to distinguish. For example, in question 5, the four choices were "believable" (可以相信), "affirmative" (肯定的是), "proved by facts" (事實證明) and "undeniable" (無可否認). Some teachers said that they could not even make the relevant decisions in a short period of time or said that the paper required deduction skills and common sense rather than Chinese knowledge, and some candidates said the paper was more like gambling than an examination. Some also commented that the passages were too difficult for CE level. Even a university professor admitted that he could not finish the exam in a reasonable amount of time. The first Vernacular Chinese passage was said to be of the difficulty of Form 7 Advanced Level Examination Chinese Language and Culture, and the second poem, Moonlight of Spring River (春江花月夜) in the Tang dynasty, was said to be of the difficulty of university Chinese. The HKESA replied that papers can be set in any format and style.

In paper 5, candidates were required to listen to a recording and do various tasks, but both the recording and the data file were criticised. A Halloween advertisement was included in the recording, and some candidates afterward said that they felt uneasy or thought the radio channel was switched. In the data file, Chinese slang terms were discussed in an extract from a newspaper article and in a poster promoting reading. Some teachers and students criticised the materials for promoting slang terms, some students said that they had not heard of such terms and others said that the HKEAA had misconceptions about the use of the slang terms. The authority responded that, as is the norm, some of the materials provided were deliberately false or worthless to promote critical thinking and choice-taking by students.

On YouTube and Internet forums, ringtones of the recording appeared after the paper, including the imitation of Cantopop duo Twins singing their song, "Lian Ai Da Guo Tian" (戀愛大過天, Love Is More Important Than Anything), and the recording of the Halloween advertisement.

Some candidates also suggested actions to protest the difficulty of the comprehension paper by wearing black clothes and staying on seats after the end of examinations on 2 May and 3 May 2008, when the English Language examinations were held.

== Publishing ==
As a regular practice, the HKEAA published past papers, marking schemes and examination reports every year. In previous years, only past papers were available; most subjects put past papers of the previous 5 years in a joint edition (except English and Putonghua, which had a tape/CD). Marking schemes were to be given only to markers.

From 2003, the authority issued the examination report and the question papers in year form, which included a question paper, suggested answers (changed to marking schemes from 2005), and candidates' performance and examination statistics; the price ranged from HK$20–45.

== See also ==
- Education in Hong Kong
- Hong Kong Advanced Level Examination
