= Ma Man-fai =

Ma Man-fai (Chinese: 馬文輝; 1905–1994) was a Hong Kong politician and social activist active in the 1950s and 1960s. He was the founder and the chairman of the United Nations Association of Hong Kong (UNAHK) from its establishment in 1953 to 1983.

== Biography ==
He was born in Hong Kong in 1905 into a merchant family of Ma Ying-piu, an Australian Chinese who founded the Sincere Department Store in Hong Kong in 1900, and his wife Fok Hing-tong. Ma Ying-piu also a supporter of the anti-Qing revolution and funded Sun Yat-sen's revolutionary activities. Ma attributed his father and his time in London as a buyer of his father's company as the inspirations of his liberal values. His mother was a social reformer, founder of the Chinese YWCA of Hong Kong and an anti-mui tsai movement leader. Ma Man-fai was educated at the Lingnan College in Canton and lived in mainland China during the Japanese occupation of Hong Kong.

In 1932, he was a director of the Tung Wah Hospital. He also held various public positions including vice-chairman of the Hong Kong City Hall, vice-chairman of the Sports Federation & Olympic Committee of Hong Kong and secretary of the Hong Kong Arts Festival. He was also a founder of various civic organisations including the Sino-British Club of Hong Kong, Hong Kong City Hall Committee, Hong Kong Music Association and Hong Kong Caritas Career Association.

He served as an interpreter for Governor Alexander Grantham. In January 1949, he co-founded the Reform Club of Hong Kong with other expatriates to push for constitutional reform as initiated by the Young Plan and the Hong Kong Chinese Reform Association with a Chinese-oriented membership. In 1953, he founded the United Nations Association of Hong Kong (UNAHK) to promoted the United Nations values to Hong Kong residents, especially the rights of self-government of the colonised people. He also held the "Hyde Park Forum" and the "Public Opinion Forum" weekly at the City Hall.

In 1963, he and other self-government advocates founded the Democratic Self-Government Party of Hong Kong to call for the internal self-government in Hong Kong. He was soon squeezed out from the party leadership. Without any result, the self-government party became less active in the 1970s.

In 1983, his position in the UNAHK was squeezed out and replaced by a pro-Beijing leadership. Afterwards, he left the association. He continued to hold the "Hyde Park Forum" at the City Hall until his death in 1994. He was remembered with his iconic long beard and cheongsam.
