= Ma Ying-piu =

Hong Kong retailer and businessman

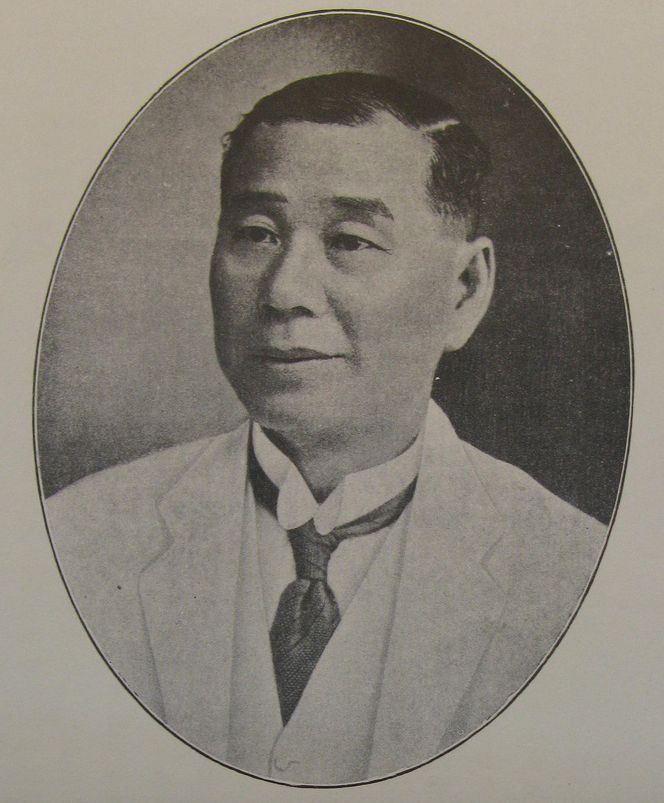
- Born: 21 December 1860; Heungshan, Guangdong, Qing China
- Died: 15 July 1944 (aged 83); Occupied Territory of Hong Kong
- Occupations: Retailer, Investor, Company director
- Spouse: Fok Hing-tong
- Children: Ma Man-fai

Chinese name
- Traditional Chinese: 馬應彪
Transcriptions
Standard Mandarin
- Hanyu Pinyin: Mǎ Yīngbiāo
- IPA: [mà íŋ.pjáʊ]
Yue: Cantonese
- Jyutping: Maa5 Jing1-biu1
- IPA: [ma˧ jɪŋ˥.piw˥]

Ma Ying-piu (Chinese: 馬應彪; 21 December 1860 – 15 July 1944) was a Hong Kong retailer and businessman. He founded the Sincere Department Store in 1900, the first Chinese-owned department store in China and is widely regarded as the "father of Chinese department stores".

== Early ventures and business career ==
Ma was born in Heungshan (known in Mandarin as Zhongshan) of the Guangdong Province on 21 December 1860. Following his father's footsteps, who had emigrated to Australia two decades before, Ma went to New South Wales at the age of 19 to work in a gold mine. He was also involved in the cultivation of bananas and the fruit trade, which was dominated by Chinese at the time. In 1892, Ma founded the fruit trading firm Wing Sang Company with other Christian Chinese from his village.

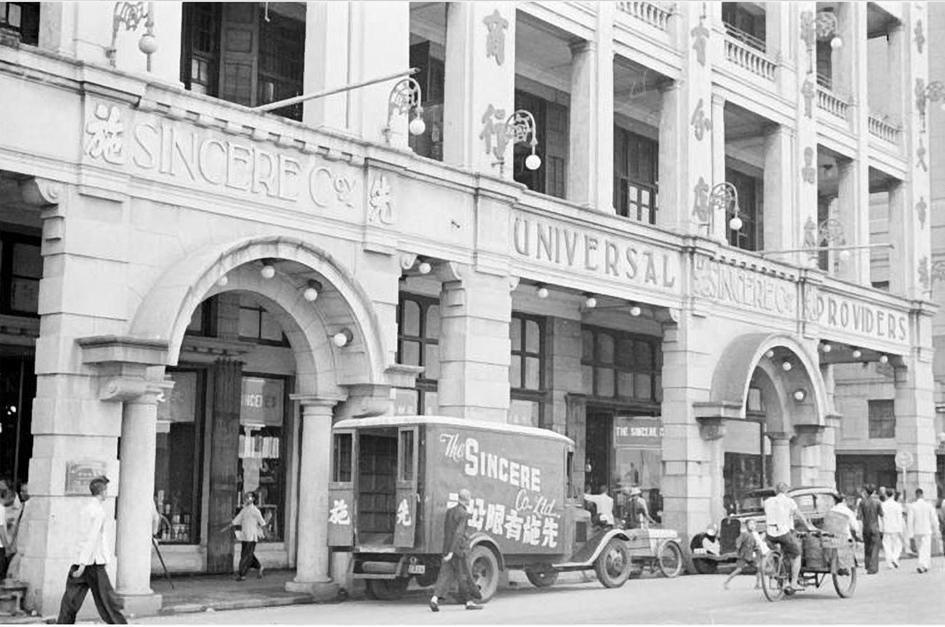
A Sincere Department Store in Central, Hong Kong, circa 1941.

Ma returned to Hong Kong in 1894 and set up a store. Impressed by the Western model of department stores, Ma opened the Sincere Department Store with other wealthy investors on 8 January 1900 at 172 Queen's Road Central, which became the first Chinese-owned department store in Hong Kong. In the store, Ma introduced Western retailing ideas and engagement of both men and women as sales assistants for the first time, which was seen as a revolutionary idea in the conservative colony. He also insisted on the policy of fixed price, the practice of providing receipt for each sale, and closing the stores on Sundays, being a Christian himself.

The Sincere opened its Canton branch in 1912 and Shanghai branch in 1917. A six-story Hong Kong store was also opened and was listed on the Hong Kong Stock Exchange in 1917. It had its branches in large cities, such as Shanghai, Guangzhou, Singapore, and Nanning, with a paid-up capital of $7,000,000 at its peak. Ma's business also diversified into banking, insurance, hotels and cosmetics, in the form of the National Commercial and Savings Bank, Ltd. in 1921, with an authorized capital of $5,000,000, as well as the Sincere Insurance and Investment Co. Ltd. and the Sincere Perfumery Factory. His business suffered from the Great Depression and the Second Sino-Japanese War in the 1930s, resulting in the collapse of his National Commercial Bank in 1935.

== Philanthropy works ==
Ma has contributed large sums to schools and hospitals, especially in his native town of Heungshan including the establishment Sai Kwong Girls’ School in Shekki, the capital of Heungshan. He also became the first Chinese director of Lingnan College in Canton, to which he made major donations. The Ma Ying-piu Infirmary and the Ma Ying-piu Guesthouse of the Sun Yat-sen University which used to be the site of Lingnan College are named after him.

== Political involvement ==
Ma first met revolutionary Sun Yat-sen, also a Heungshan native, in 1892 during a visit home and was so impressed by his vision of the resurrection of China that he agreed to provide him financial support. He supported the anti-Japanese boycott of 1908 in which he spurned Japanese products and replaced them with locally made products. He also helped set up the East Canton Red Cross Society to relieve men wounded in the Wuchang Uprising.

Ma and his wife were vocal critics of the mui tsai system, a form of child slavery prevalent in colonial Hong Kong. Mrs. Ma was also the founding member of the YWCA Hong Kong chapter.

== Family ==
He married Fok Hing-tong (1872–1957), second daughter of Fok Ching-shang, the Vicar of St. Stephen's Anglican Church. Fok Hing-tong accompanied Ma to Australia and helped out his business. She also doubled as a saleswoman on occasion. She co-founded the Young Women's Christian Association (YWCA) in Hong Kong and became its chairwoman (1920–23) and director (1920–28, 1948–57). Under her leadership, the YWCA strongly supported the anti-mui tsai movement in the 1920s. The couple had 13 children, of which the fourth son, Ma Man-fai, was a social activist.
