= Penang Po Leung Kuk =

The Penang Po Leung Kuk was founded in 1889 by Foo Tye Sin, Koh Seang Tat, Khaw Sim Bee, Ong Boon Teik and Ong Beng Teik. The Penang Po Leung Kuk was the first Anglo-Chinese welfare organisation in Penang dedicated to protecting Chinese female immigrants from exploitation and sexploitation. The organization was based on the Po Leung Kuk in Hong Kong, which was founded in 1878.

The Po Leung Kuk homes in Singapore, Malacca and Penang were controlled by committees of Chinese gentlemen, and financed by endowment funds raised from public subscriptions. The Penang Cheshire Home was set up in 1978, in a wing of the former Penang Po Leung Kuk Home.

Rosalind Hoalim, wife of Lim Cheng Ean and a well-known figure in colonial Penang, was sympathetic to the plight of unfortunate servant girls and helped various escapees from cruel households re-establish themselves at the Penang Po Leung Kuk. Later, her daughter, Datuk Lim Phaik Gan better known as P. G. Lim, led the Penang Po Leung Kuk in the 1920s and 1930s, helping to train and rehabilitate Chinese prostitutes.

== See also ==
- 1878 - Hong Kong Po Leung Kuk
- 1888 - Singapore Po Leung Kuk
- 1889 - Penang Po Leung Kuk
- 1895 - Kuala Lumpur Po Leung Kuk
- 1900 - Perak Po Leung Kuk
- 1914 - Batavia Ati Soetji (formerly Po Liang Kiok)
- Hong Kong Po Leung Kuk website.
- The Penang Po Leung Kuk: Chinese Women, Prostitution and a Welfare Organisation By Neil Khor Jin Keong and Khoo Keat Siew
