= Po Leung Kuk Tang Yuk Tien College =

- 保良局董玉娣中學
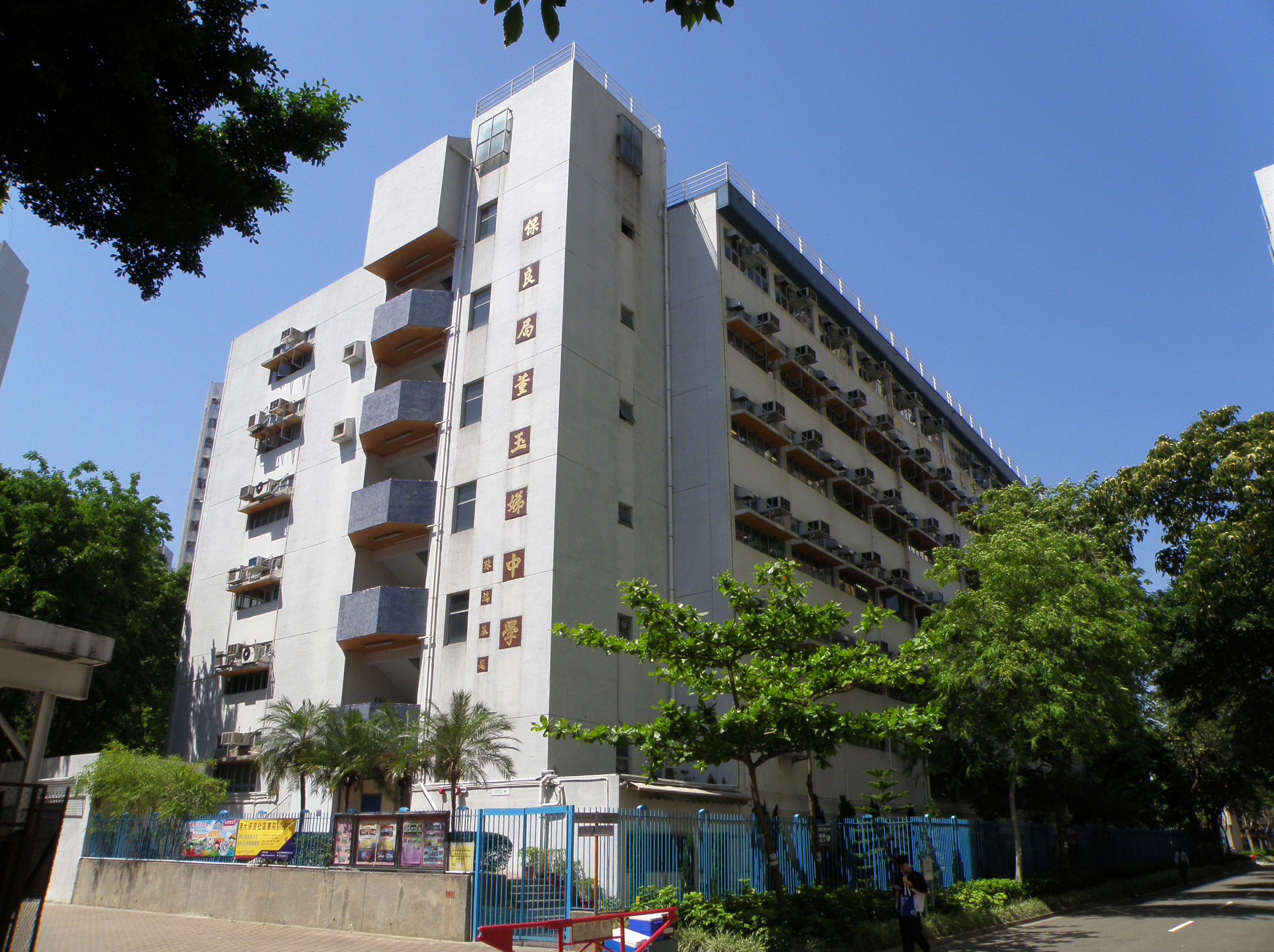

Location
- Wu King Estate, Tuen Mun; Hong Kong

Information
- Type: Grammar school
- Motto: Love, Respect, Diligence, Integrity
- Established: 1 September 1987; 39 years ago
- School district: Tuen Mun
- President: Jacquline Leung
- Principal: Lau Tsz Chung
- Grades: Secondary 1-6
- Houses: Red, Yellow, Green, Blue
- Affiliation: Po Leung Kuk
- Website: plktytc.edu.hk

Po Leung Kuk Tang Yuk Tien College
- Traditional Chinese: 保良局董玉娣中學
- Simplified Chinese: 保良局董玉娣中学
Transcriptions
Standard Mandarin
- Hanyu Pinyin: Bǎo Liáng Jú Dǒng Yùdì Zhōngxué
Yue: Cantonese
- Jyutping: bou2 loeng4 guk6*2 dung2 juk6 tai5 zung1 hok6

Po Leung Kuk Tang Yuk Tien College was opened on 1 September 1987. It is the 8th English College of Po Leung Kuk.

The principal of the college is Ryan Lau Tsz Chung.

Darnay Chan was one of the College's headmasters, most notable being the founding headmaster of PLK Vicwood KT Chong Sixth Form College.

== Student organizations ==
=== Prefect Team ===
Prefect Team helps with the daily job of disciplinary committee. There are 3 head prefects from form 5, 8 senior prefects and about 50 prefects.

=== BBS Scheme ===
Big Brothers and Sisters Scheme(BBS)helps form 1 students to be familiar with their school. In the charity fun fair each year, it takes part of snack kiosk. There are 2 BBS Senior Leaders, 4 BBS Leaders and about 25 BBSs. Senior Leaders. Leaders are form 5 students while BBSs are students from Form 3 and 4.

=== Students Union ===
- "藝萃閣" (97-98)
- I do (06-07)
- JUST (07-08)
- M&M (08-09)
- Y-Not? (09-10)
- Cash (10-11)
- Flamingo (11-12)
- Popcorn (12-13)
- Lollipop (13-14)
- Sparkle (14-15)
- Phoenix (15-16)
- Flarion (16-17)
- Pixel (17-18)
- Palette (18-19)
- Zenith (19-20)
- Herald (20-21)
- Griffin (21-22)
- Syzygy (22-23)
- Memory (23-24)
- Zephyrus (24-25)
- Resonance (25-26)
- Chronex (26-27)

=== English Society ===
It holds 10 English Speaking Day in each academic year. The society also send student representatives the join 'The Battle of Books' competition and drama improvisation competition held by the Education Bureau.

=== Mathematic Society ===
It holds different activities each year, including Sudoku competition and mathematics olympiad competition for form 2 students.

=== Astronomy Club ===
The Astronomy Club holds various activities such as nighttime stargazing events on the school roof and an Astronomy Camp. The current advisor is Mr. Lam Shui Fung.

=== Putonghua Club ===
The Putonghua Club organises workshops related to Chinese culture, such as dumpling wrapping workshops and Lunar New Year riddle guessing. It also holds the Putonghua Singing Competition.

=== Robot Club ===
It was established in 2007. It holds different activities every year to let students know more about robots, computers and technology. It even let students join inter-school competitions. Most of the activities are open to the whole school. The club is located in the Design and Technology room.

Every year, it holds a lot of workshops to let students to learn about and make robots. The join the Charity fun fair in 2008 and 2010. Also, it held an exhibition and "Robot Cup" competition for form 1 in 2007–2008. The members joined RoboCup, WRO and other inter-school competitions within these years

Members usually use LEGO Mindstorms NXT(now EV3), LEGO Education Spike and KMK SE-R2 Robot Kit. They also use Joinmax Super RCU and VEX Lego Mindstorms RCX etc.

=== English Debating Team ===
The English Debating Team consists of around 20 members. It has won a multitude of prestigious competitions, including the Hong Kong Secondary Schools Debating Competition. It also participates in public speaking contests such as Model United Nations. It assists in organising workshops for the biannual English Inter-House Debate Competition.
