= Fok Hing-tong =

Hong Kong businesswoman and social reformer

- Chinese: 霍慶棠
- Born: 1872; British Hong Kong
- Died: 1957 (aged 84–85)
- Spouse: Ma Ying-piu
- Children: 13, including Ma Man-fai

Fok Hing-tong (Chinese: 霍慶棠; 1872–1957), also known as Huo Qingtang, was a Hong Kong businesswoman and social reformer. Wife of Ma Ying-piu, founder of the Sincere Department Store, she was the director and chairwoman of Chinese YWCA of Hong Kong and the leader of the 1920s anti-mui tsai movement.

== Biography ==
Born in 1872 in into a Christian family in Hong Kong with the family root in Shunde, Guangdong, Fok's father, Fok Ching-shang, was a Vicar of St. Stephen's Anglican Church and one of the earliest Chinese clergymen in Hong Kong. Rev. Fok had no sons and wanted his four daughters to marry Christians. Fok Hing-tong married Ma Ying-piu, an Australian-Chinese businessman who was also the founder of the Sincere Department Store, the first Chinese department store in Hong Kong.

Fok accompanied Ma to Australia and returned to Hong Kong in 1894 before she convinced her husband to open the Sincere Company. When the first department store in 1900 at 172 Queen's Road Central, she also became the first modern Chinese saleswoman at a time when respectable Chinese women did not work in public.

Fok was also an active social leader in Hong Kong. She joined with her sister Fok Shui-yue, Katherine S.C. Woo and So Pui-kau to form the first women's association in Hong Kong, the Young Women's Christian Association, where she served as director from 1920 to 1928 and from 1948 to 1957 and chairwoman from 1920 to 1923.

Under her leadership, she promoted the anti-mui tsai movement, a campaign among women and girls to abolish the practice of buying young girls as servants. She was also the chairwoman of the investigation committee of the movement.

Ma and her husband Ma Ying-piu had 13 children. All her sisters married to Australian-Chinese Christians. Fok Shui-yue (1877–1961) married Ma Wing-chan (1863–1938) and Fok Fung-kiu married Kwok Kwai. Her fourth son, Ma Man-fai, was also a social activist.

== See also ==
- Anti-Mui Tsai Activism
