= United Nations Association of Hong Kong =

Hong Kong political organisation

- 聯合國香港協會
- Formation: 1953
- Founder: Ma Man-fai
- Location: Hong Kong

The United Nations Association of Hong Kong (Chinese: 聯合國香港協會) was a political organisation in Hong Kong formed by businessman Ma Man-fai in 1953. It promoted values of the United Nations and political reform including self-government of the Hong Kong residents.

== History ==
The association was founded by Ma Man-fai, who was then a director of Sincere, a departmental store chain in Hong Kong. It allied with the Reform Club of Hong Kong and Hong Kong Civic Association, the two largest political groups for a further constitutional reform in Hong Kong.

Ma, then as chairman of the Association, took an even more radical approach in the Civic-Reform coalition, as the Association became the first in Hong Kong to demand a complete internal self-government, similar to that in Singapore, in 1960. Ma said the request aligns with the Charter of the United Nations which calls for respecting "the principle of equal rights and self-determination of peoples", and does not mean independence of Hong Kong.

The Association's proposal of 1961 suggested:

1. the creation of Hong Kong citizenship for all long-term residents, irrespective of race or nationality, as a guarantee for voting and other civic rights, "so that every individual can voice his free opinion without fear or arbitrary action" as allowed under the still-unrepealed emergency ordinances.
2. free universal elementary and secondary schooling, "so that every citizen can more readily learn to understand and assume the responsibility of democratic government".
3. elected district bodies should replace the Urban Council. The district representatives would elect a few legislative councilors as a transitional measure, preparatory to their direct election by all adults who had been resident in Hong Kong for seven years.

The group also requested UN's permission to attend a meeting of Special Committee on Decolonization in 1962, but was denied by the Polish representative. In 1966, the association initiated a fund-raising campaign to support Elsie Elliot's trip to London, who was the member of the Association from 1962 to 1967, to advocate judicial reform, breaking up business monopoly, and democratization of the Legislative Council, in addition to autonomy in Hong Kong by citing Queen Elizabeth II's speech that the government would assist peoples "in the remaining Colonial territories to reach independence or some other status which they have freely chosen".

Other members of the organisation include Hilton Cheong-Leen. Governors Alexander Grantham and Robert Black were the patrons of the association. Due to the association's high-profile criticism against the government, it put the government in an embarrassing position of whether to continue its patronage of the association.

Apart from the political campaigns, the Association also organized cultural salons and seminars every week at Hong Kong City Hall inspired by Speakers' Corner, covering a wide range of topics. The well-being of hawkers and Resettlement Area residents was also one of the aims of the group.

In 1983, Ma Man-fai left the association after his leadership was being stripped away by another group in the association. Since then the association was absorbed into the united front of the pro-Beijing camp.

== Impact ==
Ma was regarded as one of the early supporters of the independence movement of Hong Kong, for his advocacy and support that Hong Kong, where its people born, bred, and dead in the city, should become an autonomous entity. While his bold notion was not widely accepted at the time, it was revisited in the later years as localism takes rise.
