= Anti-Mui Tsai Society =

- 反對蓄婢會
- Formation: 8 August 1921
- Founded at: British Hong Kong

Anti-Mui Tsai Society
- Traditional Chinese: 反對蓄婢會
Transcriptions
Yue: Cantonese
- Yale Romanization: Fáan deui chūk péih wúi
- Jyutping: Faan2 doei3 cuk1 pei5 wui2

The Anti-Mui Tsai Society was an organisation founded on 8 August 1921 dedicated to abolishing the Mui-tsai system (akin to child slavery) in colonial Hong Kong.

== Background ==
The Mui-tsai was a traditional system in China, in which girls were sold as maids to their employers. The Mui-Tsai girls were often girls sold by their poor parents to wealthier Chinese families as potential future daughters-in-law and domestic maids; some of them could also end up in the sex trade.

The system was a traditional Chinese custom that existed from the foundation of British Hong Kong in 1841. However, despite the fact that slavery and slave trade was prohibited by British law in the colony, the British authorities long preferred to ignore the issue as a private affair for rich Chinese families.

In the early 20th-century, the Mui Tsai slave trade in girls attracted attention among both Christian Chinese and British people in Hong Kong, and the Anti-Mui Tsai Society was founded 8 August 1921.

== Influence ==
The Anti-Mui Tsai Society marked the increasing social activism of Chinese Christians and labour unions in colonial Hong Kong.

Its opponents included the Society for the Protection of the Mui Tsai, which was backed by prominent merchants in the Chinese community, including Lau Chu Pak, Ho Fook and Ho Kum Tong.

An intense campaign took place against the slave trade in the British press. The campaign resulted in the introduction of a ban against the slave trade by the introduction of registration of the Mui Tsai girls, and thereby prohibition of the slave trade. However, this reform was viewed as purely cosmetic, since it was not enforced in practice.

Britain was, as a member of the League of Nations, subjected to the 1926 Slavery Convention of the League. This made it necessary for Britain to address the Mui Tsai system, and the issue attracted international attention. After strong political pressure, the Hong Kong authorities introduced the Female Domestic Service Ordinance in 1929, which prescribed that all Mui Tsai-girls were to be registered by 31 May 1930. After May 1930, no further registration - and thus no further sale - of Mui Tsai girls were to occur, and inspectors were appointed to ensure that the Mui Tsai-girls were treated well and were paid a salary.

== In popular culture ==
- Silver Spoon, Sterling Shackles (Chinese: 名媛望族), a 2012 Hong Kong television drama produced by Television Broadcasts Limited (TVB)

== See also ==
- Mui Tsai
- Anti-Mui Tsai Activism
- Society for the Protection of the Mui Tsai
