= Po Leung Kuk Celine Ho Yam Tong College =

Secondary school in Hong Kong

Coordinates: 22.3448°N 114.2040°E

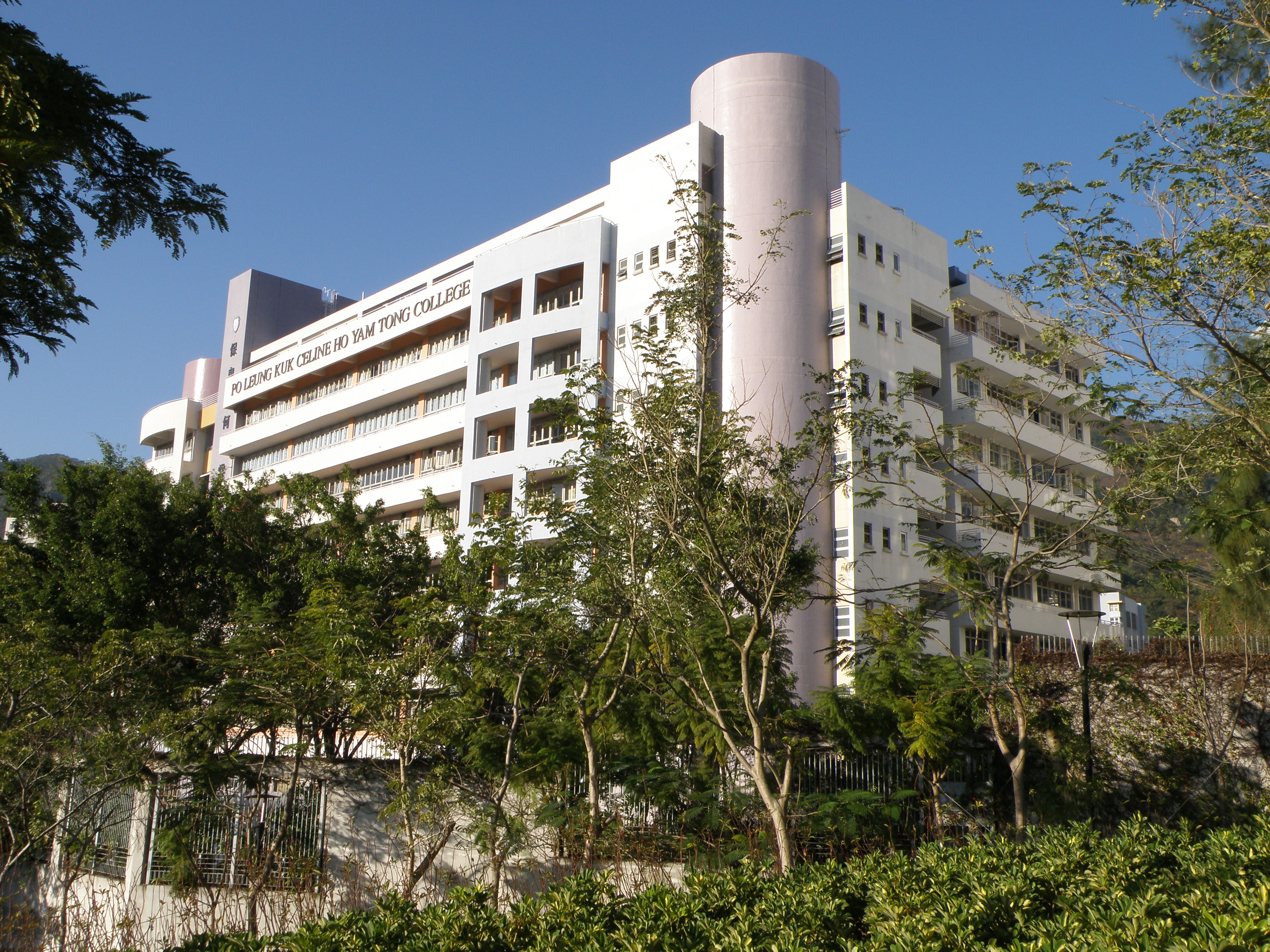
- Po Leung Kuk Celine Ho Yan Tong College (viewed from south)
- 176 Po Kong Village Road, Tsz Wan Shan, Wong Tai Sin, Hong Kong

Information
- Established: 2001
- Website: plkchc.edu.hk

Po Leung Kuk Celine Ho Yam Tong College
- Traditional Chinese: 保良局何蔭棠中學
- Simplified Chinese: 保良局何荫棠中学
Transcriptions
Standard Mandarin
- Hanyu Pinyin: Bǎo Liángjú Hé Yìntáng Zhōngxué
Yue: Cantonese
- Jyutping: bou2 loeng4 guk6 ho4 jam3 tong4 zung1 hok6

Po Leung Kuk Celine Ho Yam Tong College (Chinese: 保良局何蔭棠中學) is a secondary school located in the Po Kong Village Road School Village in Tsz Wan Shan, Kowloon, Hong Kong. Established in 2001, it was the thirteenth secondary school to open in the Po Leung Kuk.

== History ==
In the first year of opening, the Po Kong Village Road School Village was not fully completed. It borrowed the campus (the third to fourth floors) of Sir Ellis Kadoorie Secondary School in 22 Hoi Fan Road in Tai Kok Tsui, Western Kowloon. In the activity day of the same academic year, the school announced the renaming of the school from 'Po Leung Kuk Tsz Wan Shan School' to 'Po Leung Kuk Celine Ho Yam Tong School'. After the construction of the School Village was completed, the school was moved into the new campus and commenced teaching on 1 September 2002. The school's campus covers an area of more than 7,000 m^{2} (75,000 sq ft).

A 2013 report said that the school's principal had forbidden the creation of a students' union since the school's founding. That year, over 10 employees each year had departed from the school. During the 2019–2020 Hong Kong protests, Ho Yam Tang College was embroiled in controversy after a teacher had created a worksheet that alleged police "were actually colluding with triads and disregarding the lives of citizens".

== See also ==
- Po Leung Kuk No.1 W. H. Cheung College
