= Po Leung Kuk Ngan Po Ling College =

Coordinates: 22.3127°N 114.1898°E

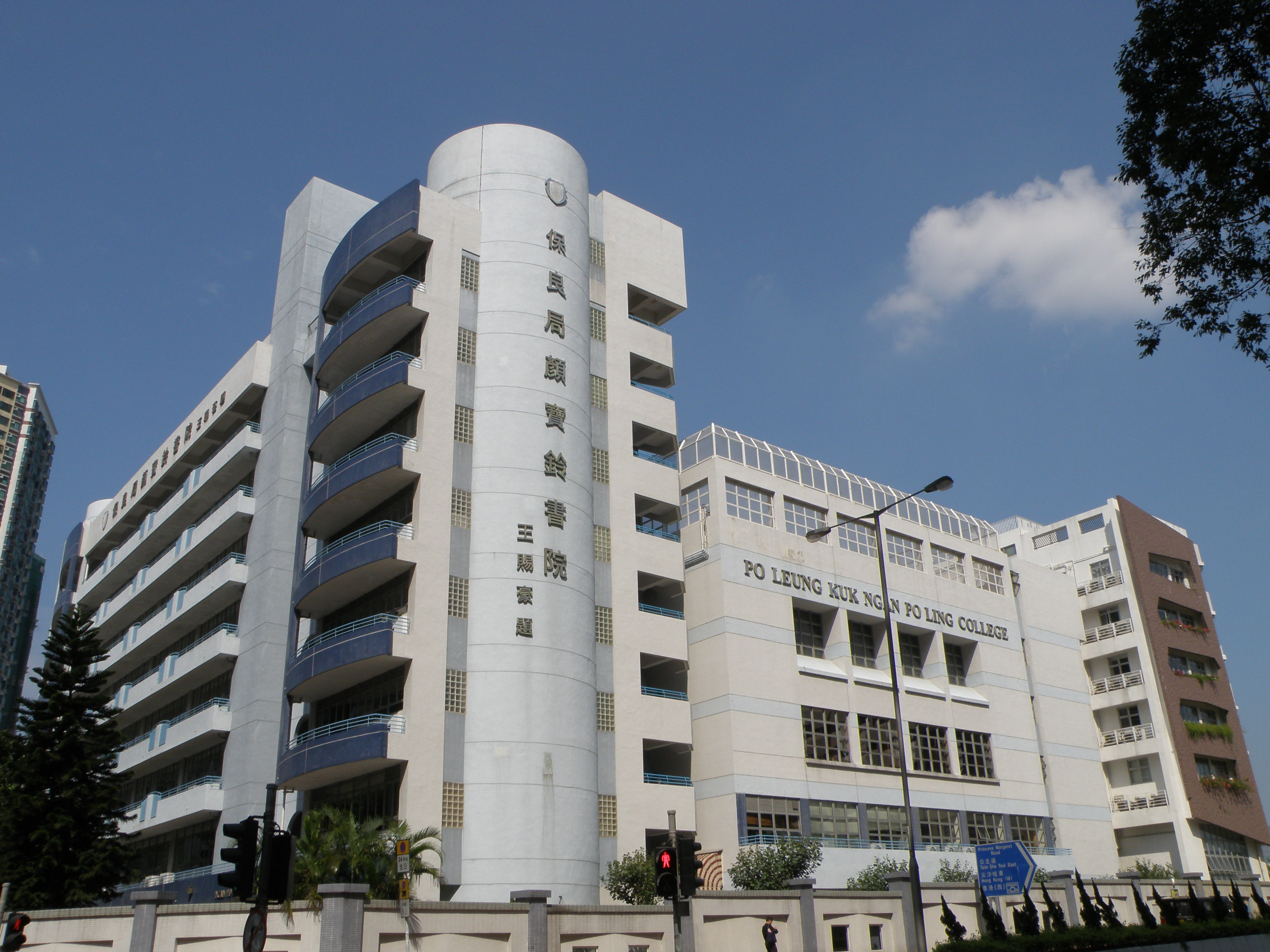
- 26 Sung On Street, To Kwa Wan, Kowloon, Hong Kong

Information
- Type: School
- Motto: Respect, Love, Diligence, Sincerity
- Established: September, 2003
- Principal: Mr. CHAU Chor Shing
- Website: http://www.npl.edu.hk

Po Leung Kuk Ngan Po Ling College (Chinese: 保良局顏寶鈴書院), often abbreviated as PLKNPLC or NPL, is a co-educational secondary school in Hong Kong.

The school was established by Po Leung Kuk and named after Po Leung Kuk director Madam Ngan Po Ling for her sponsorship. It is located at 26 Sung On Street, To Kwa Wan, Kowloon, Hong Kong

It is the first Po Leung Kuk secondary school under the Direct Subsidy Scheme (直接資助中學).

The school curriculum uses English as medium of instruction in all subjects with the exception of Chinese, Chinese History and other Chinese-related subjects, and French.

The school is providing both HKDSE and IB curriculums.

== History ==
The school was established by Po Leung Kuk in September 2003 and was named after Po Leung Kuk director Madam Ngan Po Ling in honor of her sponsorship. It is located at 26 Sung On Street, Hung Hom, Kowloon, Hong Kong.

== Facilities ==
The school is a Y2K school campus with an extra self-financed New Annex of 7,000 square meters.

=== Science Centre ===
The Astronomy and Meteorology Science Centre is equipped with computer systems to control the telescope on the roof during star gazing activities. The Star Gazing Corner, with the largest refractors among all Hong Kong secondary schools, consists of two domes for observing planets and galaxies, providing opportunities for students to explore the outer space and widen their exposure. The school also holds regular astronomy seminars and workshops for the public.

Equipped with advanced analytical research instruments such as Fourier-Transform Infrared Spectrometer (FTIR) and High Performance Liquid Chromatography (HPLC), the Chinese Medicine Research Centre is where the school's Chinese Medicine Research Team conducts research like Chinese medicine authentication and studies on the active ingredients in Chinese herbs.

=== Sports facilities ===
The school's gym room is where students have their fitness programmes.

The race track promotes the school's Athletics Team's on-campus training.

The indoor swimming pool is sterilized by Miox mixed oxidant disinfecting system.

Together with the race track, the school's long jump pit promotes the school's Athletics Team's on-campus training. It also further enhances the school's PE facilities, nurturing a healthy lifestyle for students.

=== Others ===
Students can make live broadcasts at the Campus TV Station. The school produces both English and Putonghua programmes. The conference room is also where the full-day programmes of the school's internal Model United Nations take place.

Exchange Room is the school's Exchange Programme Centre, which is the headquarters for multi-lateral cultural exchange activities. It is specially designed for exhibitions and receiving administrators, teachers, and students from the school's overseas sister schools.

Multipurpose Rooms are equipped to serve as a meeting hub.

Furthermore, the rooms can be used for counselling and personal growth workshops for small groups and individuals, as well as serving as a cosy space for student support work as well as a gathering place for Parent-Teacher Association (PTA). Teachers, as well as social workers, will arrange individual or small group consultations with students. PTA committee and volunteers may have causal gatherings and meetings.

With seating accommodating around 90 students, the Lecture Theatre is where forums and debating competitions are held.

At the student hostels, boarding facilities are available.
