= King Wah Centre =

Shopping centre in Mong Kok, Hong Kong

Coordinates: 22.317880°N 114.169903°E

- 瓊華中心
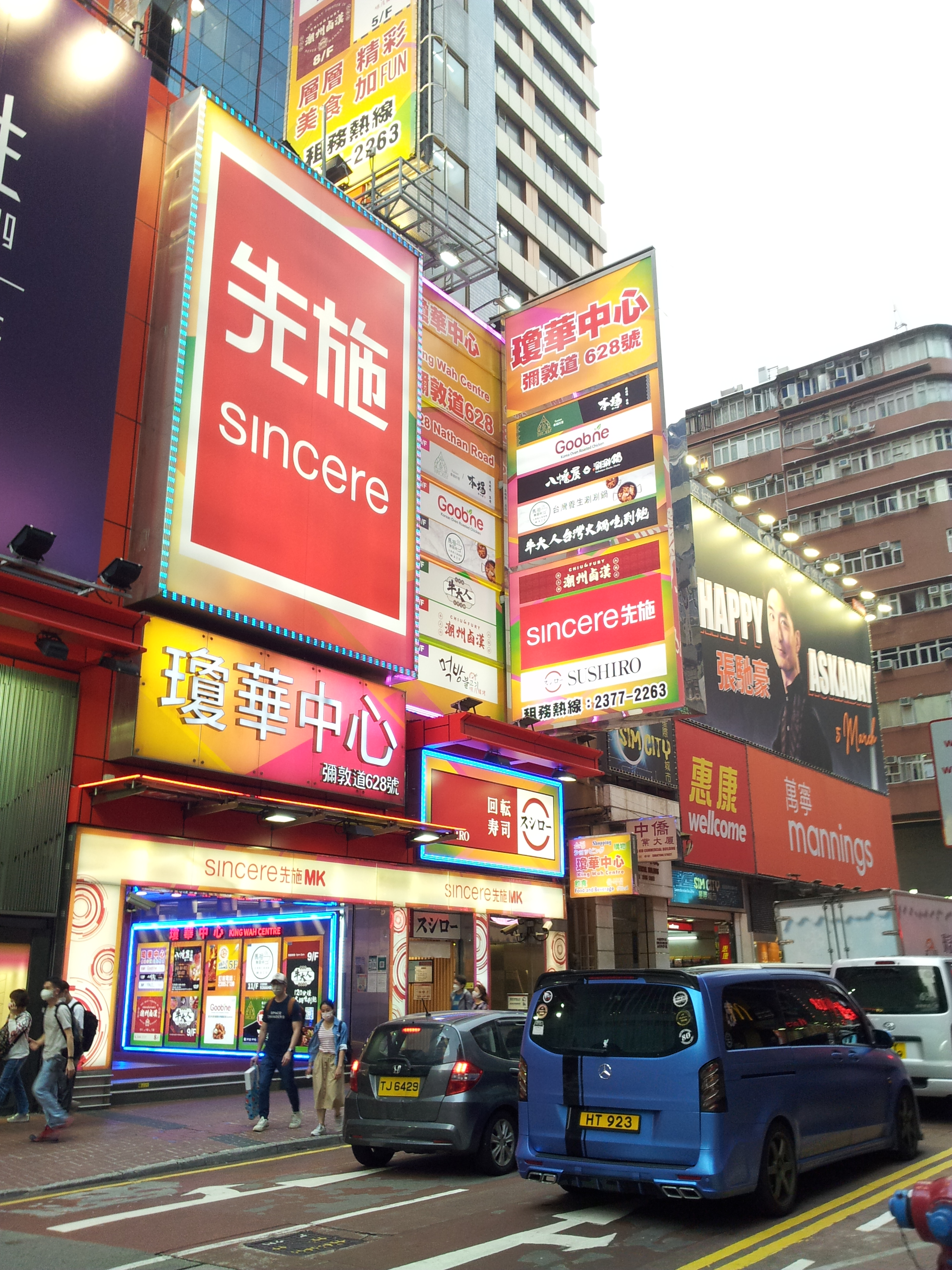
- Interactive map of the King Wah Centre area

General information
- Location: Mong Kok; Hong Kong, 628 Nathan Road, Mongkok, Kowloon
- Opening: 1955

The King Wah Centre (Chinese: 瓊華中心; Jyutping: king4 faa1 zung1 sam1), situated at the northeast corner of Shantung Street and Nathan Road, is a popular shopping centre in the Mong Kok area of Hong Kong. The 16-storey building features ten restaurant floors and a multi-storey Sincere Department Store and formerly housed three karaoke floors, along with 136 stores selling a variety of fashionable products.

== History ==
=== King Wah Restaurant ===
In 1955, 'The king of dim sum restaurants' Tan Jienan (譚傑南), who was from Foshan and once operated Taotaoju (陶陶居) in Guangzhou, opened King Wah Restaurant. The floor area of the five storey building was approximately 40,000 square feet (3,700 m^{2}) and used for banquets hosting more than 150 diners. It was a landmark of Mong Kok at the time and served different segments of society on each of its five floors:

- 1/F was bakery with spittoon in the store that served grassroots
- 2/F was a Western restaurant
- 3/F was a Chinese tea house with carpets (粵式茶樓);
- 4/F was a Chinese wine house (酒樓) with waiters serving customers with towels, and asked customers for tips;
- 5/F was a nightclub that served the upper class.

An unwritten tradition was that on horse racing days, gamblers would eat homemade sachima at 20 to 30% discount there. The commonly known name of 'sachima' (馬仔) is the pun of 'horse' in Cantonese, thus gamblers believed that after they have eaten it, they would win at horse racing (“食完馬仔，贏馬仔” ). During each year's Mid-Autumn Festival a large advertisement for moon cake would be displayed outside the restaurant.

The restaurant closed in 1989. The building was then leased to Wing On Department Stores until it closed and was demolished in 1998.

=== King Wah Centre ===
The current building cost two hundred million Hong Kong dollars to build and opened in 2002. Its tenants included small independent shops selling popular clothing and accessories aimed primarily at teenage customers. The new shopping centre was colloquially referred to as "Red Spot" (紅點) as the building's sign used to feature a distinctive red spot, now covered up by other signage.

=== A new tenant ===
In June 2013, all 130 original tenants moved out of King Wah Centre, which was taken over by the Sincere Department Store, one of the oldest local department stores in Hong Kong. Other bidders for the property included the American clothing brand Forever 21. The rent will be in a monthly rate of HKD $6,000,000 and $200 per square feet with a rental period of 10 years. The Sincere shop in Grand Century Place (新世紀廣場) is currently undergoing refurbishment and is expected to be much smaller in size after the renovation, and Sincere found that King Wah Centre would a perfect location for Sincere to expand their business further in the same district. Local citizens have criticized the loss of small businesses associated with this takeover.

== Floors ==
- B/F is the basement where there are photo sticker machines for people to take photos.
- G/F is the ground floor which is leased out to Chow Sang Sang.
- UG - 3/F is the Sincere Department Store.
- 5 - 16/F feature Japanese, Korean and Western restaurants.
