= Po Leung Kuk Stanley Ho Sau Nan Primary School =

Primary school in Hong Kong

Coordinates: 22.3351°N 114.1967°E

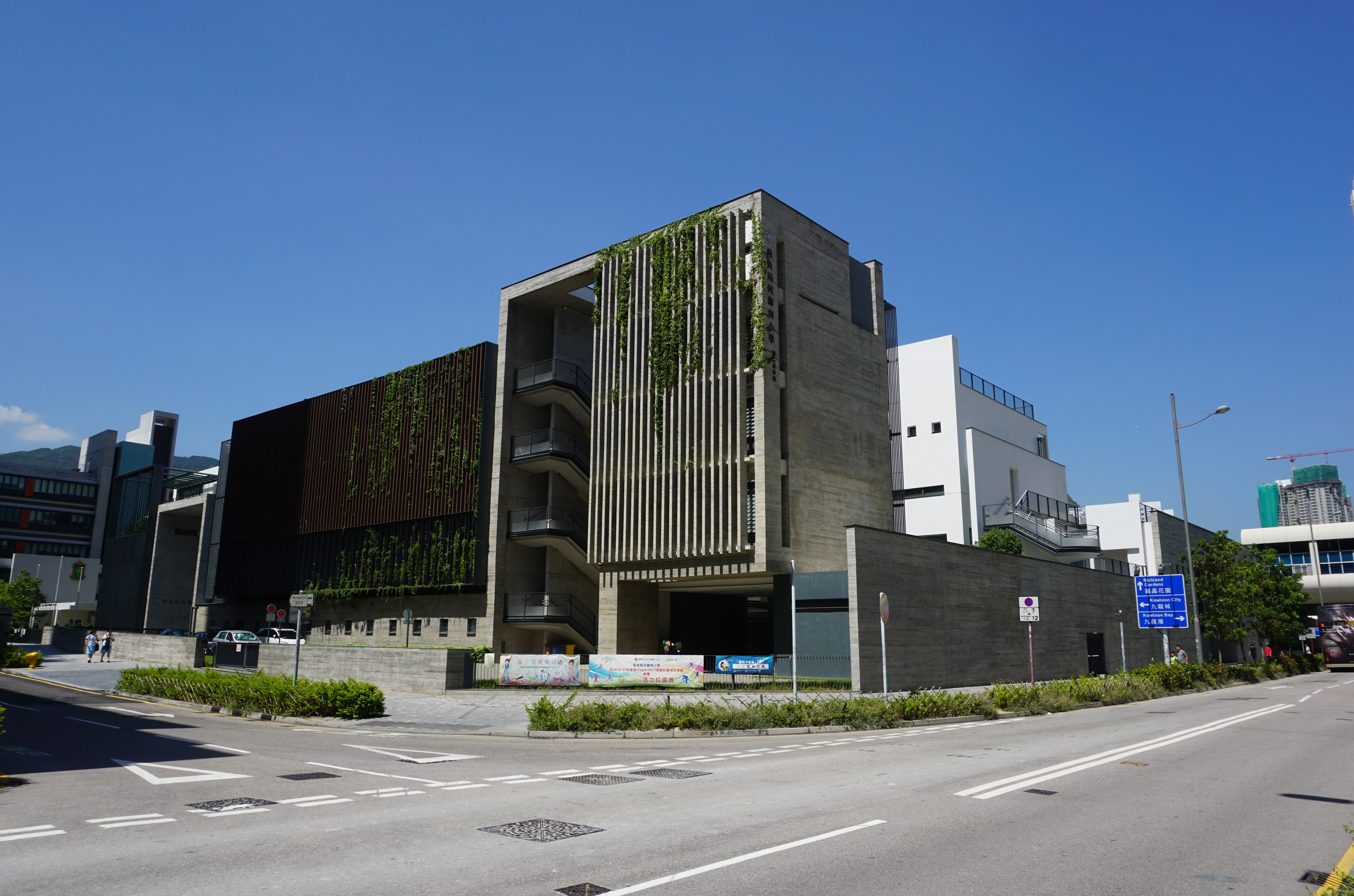
School campus since 2016

Po Leung Kuk Stanley Ho Sau Nan Primary School (Chinese: 保良局何壽南小學) is a primary school located in Kai Tak, Kowloon City, in Hong Kong. It is a co-ed primary school using Chinese as the medium of instruction established by the Po Leung Kuk in 1971. There are 24 classes in total, four for each year, and with approximately 40 students in a class, giving approximately 960 students in total. It is one of the nominated schools of Po Leung Kuk No.1 W. H. Cheung College.

== History ==
The primary school was originally located in Tsz Wan Shan, named Po Leung Kuk (PLK) Committee Fellowship Association (CFA) No. 4 Primary School. Later in 1994, financed by Po Leung Kuk Director Ho Chi Ho, it was moved to 30 Hong Keung Street in San Po Kong and renamed Po Leung Kuk Stanley Ho Sau Nan Primary School in remembrance of his father Stanley Ho Sau Nan.

In 2001, the school was expanded with the construction of its new wing. A social worker was also employed to give guidance to the students.

Po Leung Kuk Stanley Ho Sau Nan Primary School was the name of 2 half-day schools (morning and afternoon) before the change to a full-day school in 2002. The morning school was moved to Tsz Wan Shan and renamed Po Leung Kuk Grandmont Primary School, and the afternoon school was kept in the original campus.

It has been moved to Kai Tak since 2016, and the San Po Kong campus has been granted to Po Leung Kuk Mrs. Chan Nam Chong Memorial Primary School.

== See also ==
- Po Leung Kuk No.1 W. H. Cheung College
