= Po Leung Kuk Lo Kit Sing (1983) College =

Secondary school in Tsing Yi, Hong Kong

- 保良局羅傑承(一九八三)中學
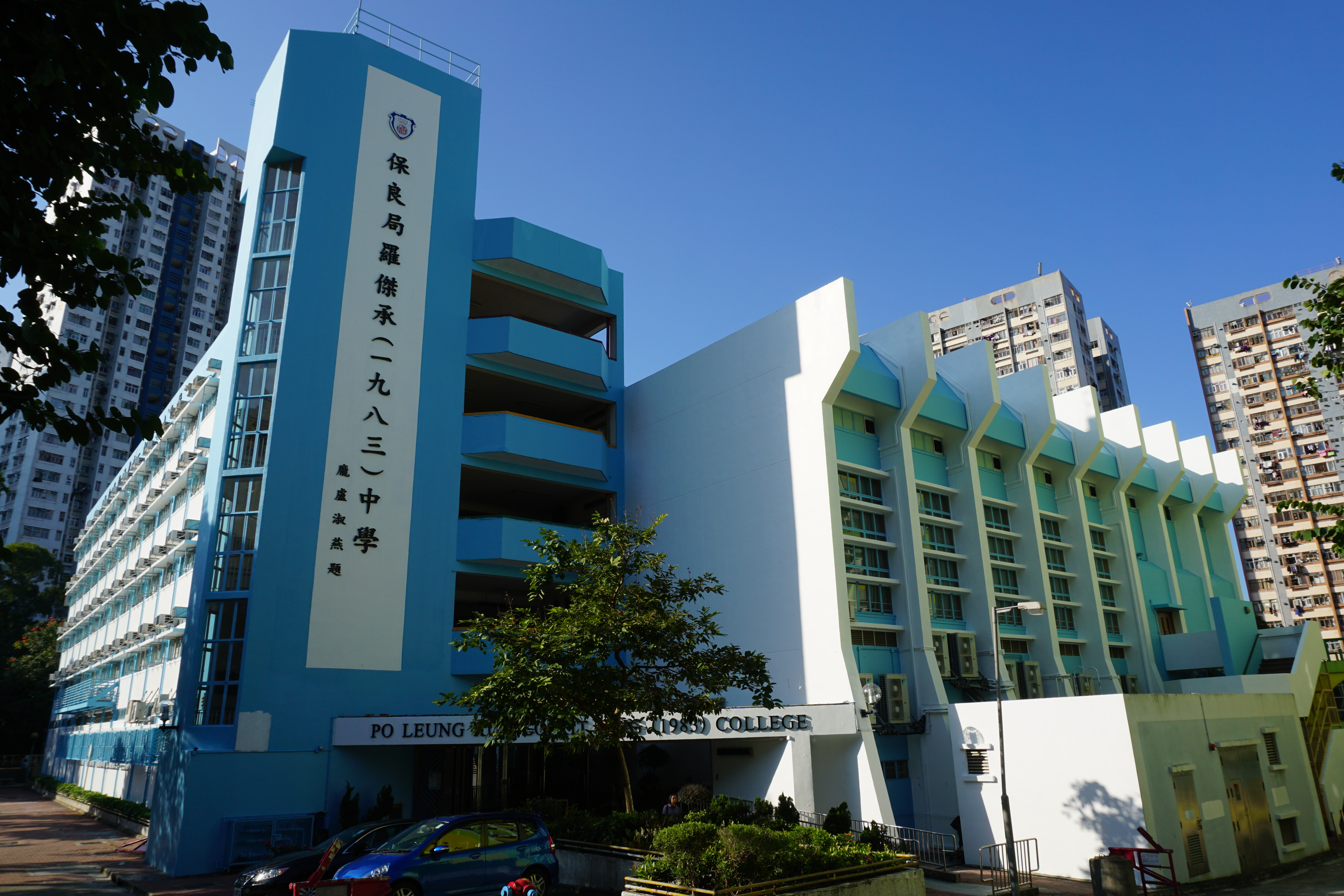
- Pictured in 2016

Location
- Cheung Hong Estate, Tsing Yi, New Territories; Hong Kong
- Coordinates: 22.3495°N 114.1032°E

Information
- School type: Aided Secondary school
- Motto: Love, Respect, Diligence, Honesty (愛、敬、勤、誠)
- Established: 1984
- School district: Kwai Tsing District
- Chairman: Chu Man-chung
- Principal: Law Wing-chung
- Teaching staff: 52 (as of 2017)
- Grades: 6
- Gender: Co-educational
- Classes: 24 (as of 2017)
- Language: Predominantly English
- Campus size: About 6,500 m²
- Houses: Green; Blue; Yellow; Red
- Affiliation: Po Leung Kuk
- Website: www.plk83.edu.hk

Po Leung Kuk Lo Kit Sing (1983) College (Chinese: 保良局羅傑承(一九八三)中學) is a Hong Kong secondary school. Located in Cheung Hong Estate, Tsing Yi, New Territories, the subsidised secondary school was founded by Po Leung Kuk, a Hong Kong charitable organisation, in 1984. It was the first secondary school on the island. The school was named as Po Leung Kuk 1983 Board of Directors' College (Chinese: 保良局八三年總理中學) before 2011.

== Introduction ==
The school arranges numerous regular extracurricular activities for all students. Annual school events include reading activities, dance festivals, music festivals, drama performances, Chinese cultural week, swimming galas, sports days and summer camp.

The school has been a vanguard of project-based learning since the 1990s, when the approach was relatively new to many Hong Kong secondary schools. Students, divided into tetrads or pentads, have to finish a project throughout their summer vacation. Also, students need to complete various projects related to each subject they are studying.

The school adopted English as the medium of instruction (EMI) in September 2010, owing to its efforts to strengthen the role of English language in the school. For instance, one-third of the school's lessons in an academic year are conducted in English. Its morning assembly is also conducted in English.

== Name change controversy ==
=== Background ===
Po Leung Kuk, founder of the school, announced an identified donor, Mr Lo, donated HK$10 million to the school, in January 2010. The school then proposed a change to its name to honor the donor. The school's proposal soon sparked controversy among students and alumni of the school, which later launched a Facebook campaign to ask for withdrawal of the proposal. During the consultation period, Po Leung Kuk held discussions with different stakeholders of the school, claiming the overall response to the name change was positive. Student union of the school, in response to the controversy, held a forum on 25 January 2010 to deliberate the issue. Hui Wing-ho, then-principal of the school, was invited to the forum.

=== Confirmation ===
Po Leung Kuk confirmed the long-speculated name change of the school after Lo Kit-sing, then-vice-chairman of Hong Kong Football Association, donated HK$7.8 million to the school, in June 2011. New name of the school, Po Leung Kuk Lo Kit Sing (1983) College, was unveiled on 14 September 2011 by a representative from Po Leung Kuk. Education Bureau approved the school's application for the name change on 28 November 2011 and informed the school can adopt the new name two days later. A naming ceremony, officiated by Michael Suen Ming-yeung, then-Secretary for Education, was held on 2 December 2011 to celebrate the name change.

== Teaching overview ==
=== The development of major projects ===
The school actively promotes the four teaching reform programs of "專閱德訊". Thematic research courses have been introduced for more than a decade. In addition to reading programs, the school conducts annual reading harvest day promotion activities. In addition, teachers and students have fully applied IT in learning and teaching. The Civic and Moral Education Group has a wealth of standing activities, such as Voicing our values.

=== Information Technology Teaching ===
The school has more than 300 computers, each classroom is equipped with LCD projector and multimedia player system, and set the whiteboard. Together with all teachers completing the training in information technology, multimedia teaching has basically penetrated into various subjects. It is not uncommon for students to watch videos, presentations, and download materials from the internet in class.

=== Extracurricular activities / Co-curricular activities(CCA) ===
Extracurricular activities in the school are responsible for extracurricular activities. Activities include teams and interest groups, divided into five major categories of academic, arts, interests, sports, and services. Expansion of learning space as the main line, emphasizing the learning experience outside the classroom. The school has 5 layers of 59 extracurricular activities, namely four clubs, school teams, uniform team, academic society and interest groups. In the first and second levels, a one-person-one-team and one-two-team learning policy will be implemented. In the first one, the Music For All Program and the third, fourth and fifth executive training programs will be implemented.

School team: badminton team, women's volleyball team, men's volleyball team, women's basketball team, men's basketball team, swimming team, men's soccer team, women's soccer team, dodge team, choir, drama team, modern dance team, Chinese dance team, Visual Arts Team, Wind Orchestra, String Orchestra, Law Pioneers, Performing Arts Team, Creative Thinking Team, Musical Team, INLA Dance Team, Chinese Orchestra, Woodpipe Team, Hand Bell Team

Uniformed Teams: Girl Scouts (NT 234), Scout (Tsing Yi 12th Brigade)

Academic Society: Chinese Society, English Society, Mathematical Society, Science Society, Society of Social Sciences

Interest groups: English Debate Club, Chess Club, Broadcast Club, Christian Fellowship, Defense Science Club, Information Technology Club, English Learning Club of Painting, Geography Club, Home Economics Club, Magic Club, Creative Thinking Club, Model Production Club, Mandarin Club, Ping Pong Club, Handicraft Club, English Theater Club, Floral Society, Electronics Club, Campus TV Production Society, Journalism Training Club, Japanese Culture Club, Aviation Club, Creative Maths Club

=== Student union ===
Each year, the student union's cabinet is made up of schoolchildren, and the chairman / officer is pre-organized. And then by the school students from September to October each year to vote by the election form. If there is more than one student union officer to be elected, the voting form is one-person-one-vote voting for the cabinet to be elected, with the largest number of winners winning. On the contrary, if there is only one group of cabinet members participating in the election, the voting form will be changed to "trust / mistrust" voting and more than half of the "trust" votes must be obtained or there will be no cabinet in that year.

Academic year	Proposed cabinet (elected cabinet as bold)
2009/2010	YOU
2010/2011	Heart
2011/2012	BeACon; H2O
2012/2013	BASIS
2013/2014	ZERO
2014/2015	SCOPE; TRIANGLE
2015/2016	neXus; spectrum; SIRI
2017/2018	Lumos; Avalon
2018/2019	SPARK; Polaris
2019/2020	espoir
2020/2021	Echo; Ethereal
2021/2022	No student cabinet election
2022/2023	Cohere
2023/2024	Sparklers; Synergy
2024/2025	Ardentia

== School principals ==
- Terence Chang Cheuk-cheung (1984-1987)
- Isaac Tse Pak-hoi (1987-2003)
- Hui Wing-ho (2003-2014)
- Lo Wing-chung (2014–present)

== Notable alumni ==
- (ascending order of admission year)
- Karson Oten Fan Karno: a former English Language tutor in Hong Kong, he established All-star education and all branches winded up in October, 2008. He announced retirement in the same period.
- Toni Wong Shan: a former journalist and reporter of ATV, TVB and Phoenix Hong Kong Channel.
- Fong Fu Yeon: a secondary school teacher who published articles online about social issues.
- Lam Lei Carrie: the second runner-up in the 2005 Miss Hong Kong pageant.
- Lui Wing Kai, Eric: a Hong Kong poet, author and film critic. Doctor of Philosophy.
- Mak, George Kam Wah: a linguistic and religious scholar, now working in HKBU as an assistant professor.
- Sonia Kong: representative of Hong Kong Female Beach Volleyball Team, concurrently as a Now TV Hong Kong beach volleyball commentator and football program host, plane model, is a hospital nurse.
- Tsang Kin Ho: one of the founders of Tower of Saviors.
- Anson Lo: a member of Hong Kong boy band Mirror
- Albert Lee: a platoon squads sergeant of Civil Aid Service

== See also ==
- Po Leung Kuk
- Education in Hong Kong
- List of secondary schools in Hong Kong
- List of schools in Hong Kong
