= Singapore Po Leung Kuk =

Historical institution in Singapore

The Singapore Po Leung Kuk (Chinese: 保良局) was an institution in Singapore for women and girls who were victims of forced prostitution. The Po Leung Kuk was established by the Chinese Protectorate in 1888, after a similar institution Po Leung Kuk was founded in Hong Kong in 1878.

== History ==
It began as a single room with six beds and was meant for permanent juvenile residents. This was expanded to 120 beds in 1896, with new accommodation in 1928 providing for 300 residents. Beginning in 1931, accommodation was provided for in the Mental Hospital for 'moral imbeciles and feeble-minded girls' unsuitable for accommodation in a Po Leung Kuk Home.

During the British Military Administration, the Po Leung Kuk Welfare Home in Singapore was turned into a training school to reform girls who had fallen or been coerced into prostitution during the war.

== See also ==
- Po Leung Kuk (Hong Kong)
- Penang Po Leung Kuk
- Kuala Lumpur Po Leung Kuk
