= Po Leung Kuk =

Hong Kong charity

- 保良局
- Emblem of the Po Leung Kuk

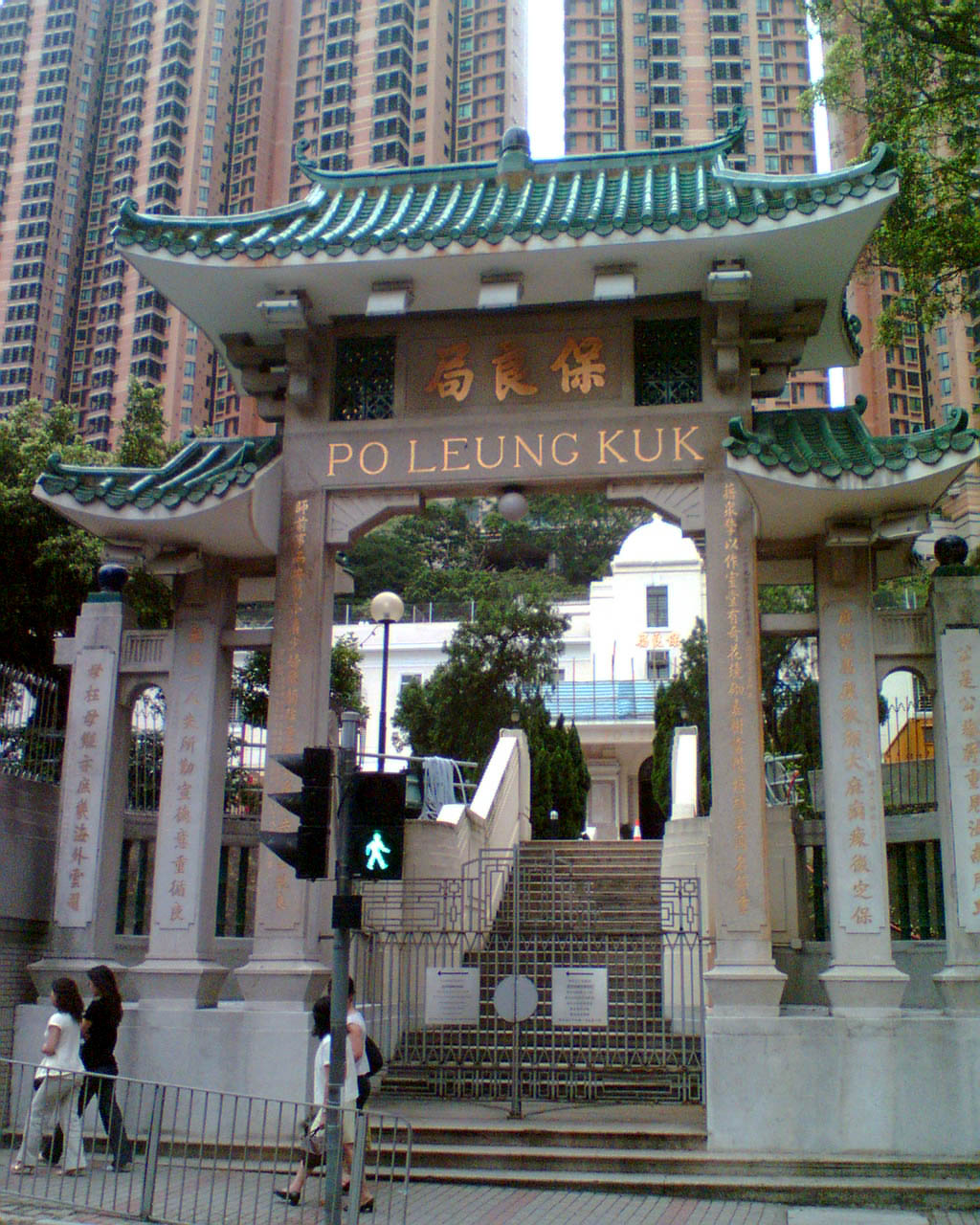
- Po Leung Kuk
- Formation: 8 November 1878; 147 years ago
- Founded at: British Hong Kong
- Legal status: Active
- Headquarters: 66 Leighton Road, Hong Kong Island
- Location: Hong Kong
- Chairman: Dr Jenny Y C TAM
- Vice-chairmen: Mrs Emily H Y TANG; Mr Arnaldo Y H HO; Mr Louie S N LAM; Mr Patrick H C KWOK; Mrs Candy W K HO
- Board of directors: Mr Andrew NGAN; Ms Carmen K M CHOI; Ms Winnie NG, JP; Mrs Stephanie TANG; Mr Simon S W CHAN; Mr Mo K M WONG; Mr Derek MON; Mr Winson K Y LEUNG; Ms Fay H L CHEUNG, MH; Mrs Laverna J L CHAN TONG; Mr Teddy W T CHUNG; Mr Jeffrey T Y YIM; Mr Nicholas L SETO; Mr Edmond M B LEE, MH, JP
- Website: Official website
- Formerly called: Society for the Protection of Women and Children

Po Leung Kuk
- Chinese: 保良局
Transcriptions
Standard Mandarin
- Hanyu Pinyin: Bǎo Liáng Jú
Yue: Cantonese
- Yale Romanization: Bóu lèuhng guhk
- Jyutping: Bou2 loeng4 guk6

The Po Leung Kuk, founded as the Society for the Protection of Women and Children, is a charitable organisation in Hong Kong that provides support for orphaned children, education and other services. Its early offices were located on Po Yan Street.

== History ==
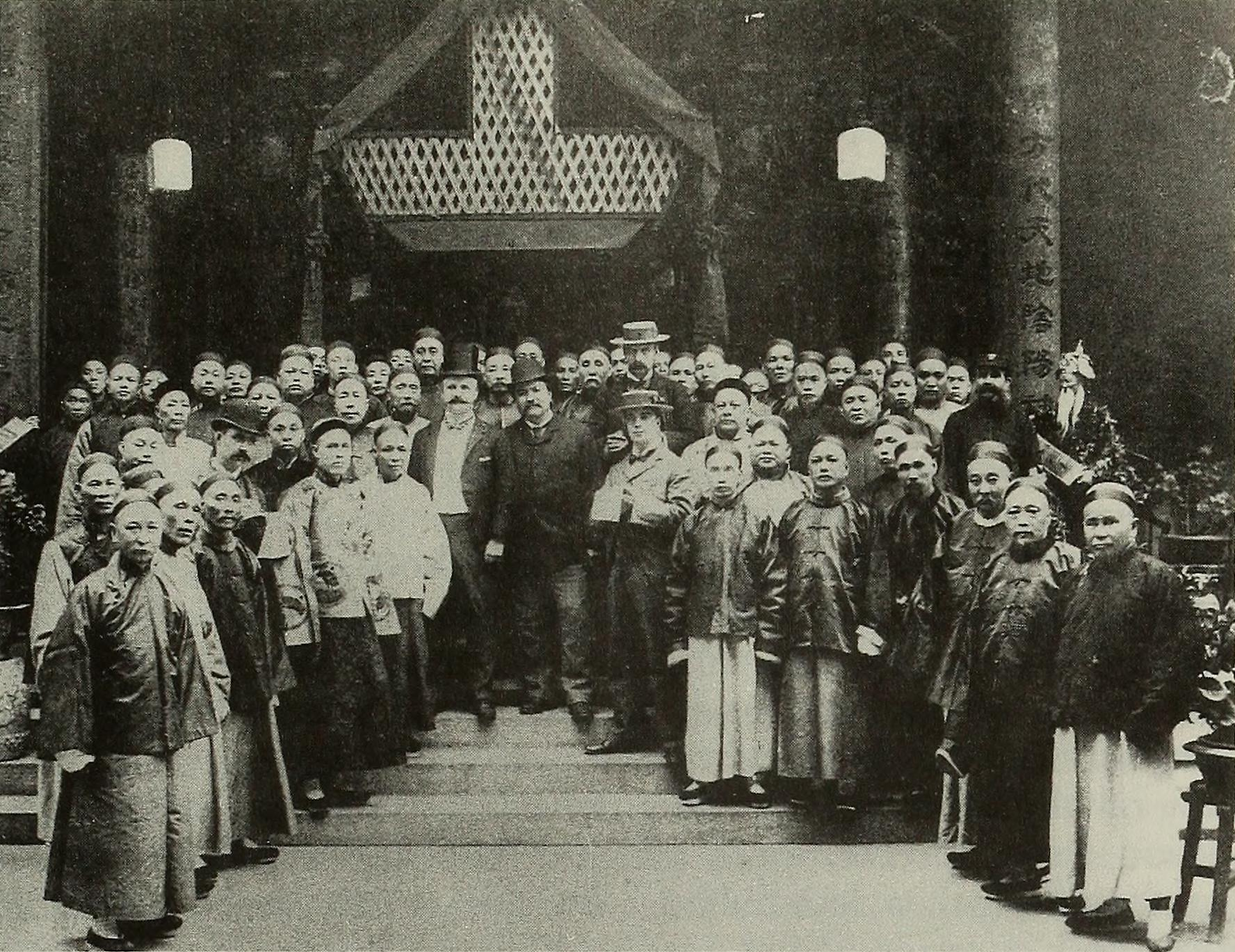
Dr. Kai Ho and colonial secretary James Stewart Lockhart at the opening of the Po Leung Kuk in 1896

In the late 19th century, abduction and trafficking of women and children were widespread in Hong Kong, under the mui tsai system. On 8 November 1878, a group of local Chinese (Lo Lai-ping, Shi Shang-kai, Fung Ming-shan and Tse Tat-shing) presented a petition to the governor of Hong Kong, John Pope Hennessy, to set up the Po Leung Kuk to rescue the kidnapped victims, and the society was officially opened in August 1882.

The stated objective of the Kuk, as it is informally known, is to care for the young and protect the innocent. In the early days, it was primarily engaged in suppressing abduction of women and children and providing shelters and education for such victims. There were some difficulties with the colonial government, as a result of cultural differences, but the overall intention of improving the lot of unfortunates was earnestly pursued. However, it has been suggested that the arrangements the Kuk provided had the convenient effect of maintaining a supply of servants and potential concubines for the wealthy Chinese families of Hong Kong, in a "peculiarly Chinese form of patriarchy".

Today the Po Leung Kuk has over 300 units providing a wide spectrum of services, including social services (including medical services), educational services, recycling centers, recreational services and cultural services.

== Services ==
The Kuk currently runs more than 300 units throughout Hong Kong, providing welfare, educational, cultural and recreational services.

Schools operated by the Po Leung Kuk include:

- Po Leung Kuk Camões Tan Siu Lin Primary School
- Po Leung Kuk Celine Ho Yam Tong College
- Po Leung Kuk Choi Kai Yau School
- Po Leung Kuk Lo Kit Sing (1983) College
- Po Leung Kuk Mrs. Ma Kam Ming-Cheung Fook Sien College
- Po Leung Kuk Ngan Po Ling College
- Po Leung Kuk No.1 W. H. Cheung College
- Po Leung Kuk Stanley Ho Sau Nan Primary School
- Po Leung Kuk Tang Yuk Tien College
- Po Leung Kuk Tsing Yi Secondary School (Skill Opportunity)
- Po Leung Kuk Vicwood K. T. Chong Sixth Form College

== See also ==
- Primary Mathematics World Contest
- Po Leung Kuk Museum
- Kuala Lumpur Po Leung Kuk
- Penang Po Leung Kuk
- Singapore Po Leung Kuk
