= Po Leung Kuk No.1 W. H. Cheung College =

Secondary school in Wong Tai Sin, Hong Kong

Coordinates: 22.3464°N 114.2059°E

Po Leung Kuk No.1 W.H. Cheung College
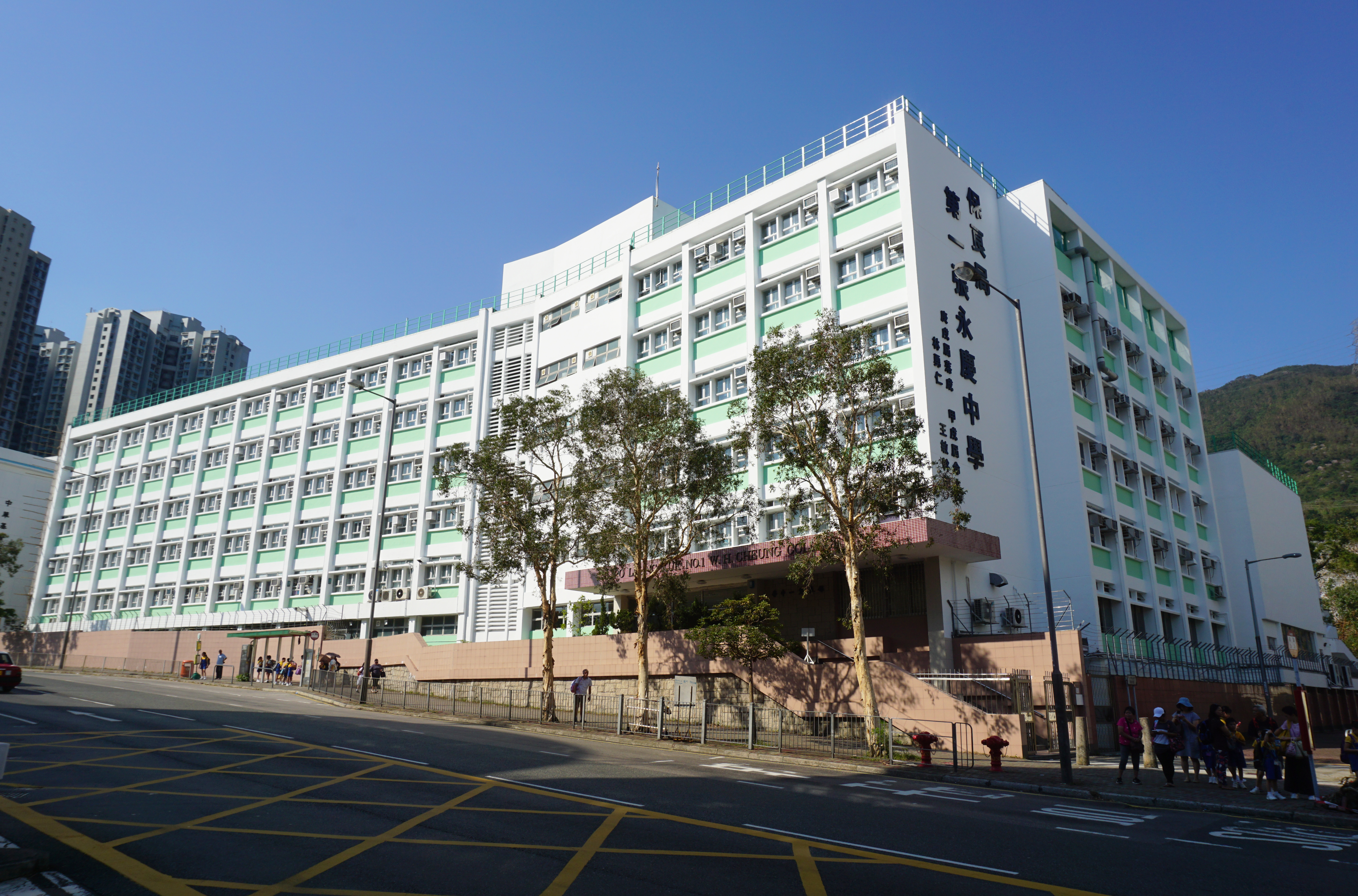
- 173 Po Kong Village Road, Tsz Wan Shan, Kowloon, Hong Kong

Information
- Motto: Love Respect Diligence Sincerity
- Established: 1971
- Principal: Ms. Leong Yuk Ping
- Website: plkno1.edu.hk

Po Leung Kuk No.1 W. H. Cheung College (Chinese: 保良局第一張永慶中學), also known as Po 1, is a secondary school located at 173 Po Kong Village Road, Tsz Wan Shan, Kowloon, Hong Kong. It was the first school established by Po Leung Kuk in 1971, and was named Po Leung Kuk C.F.A. No.1 College (Chinese: 保良局總理聯誼會第一中學). The school uses English as the medium of instruction (except the subjects Chinese and Chinese History).

== History ==
- In the 1970s, the Hong Kong Government encouraged secondary learning. Therefore, Po Leung Kuk started a plan to establish the first secondary school.
- In 1967, Hong Kong Government allotted 50,000 sq. meter of land to Po Leung Kuk to help with her work. She made use of the land to establish her first secondary school, named Po Leung Kuk C.F.A. No.1 Secondary School. The establishment of the school drove Po Leung Kuk to establish more schools to provide education services. Later, the school was provided with classrooms from Po Leung Kuk C.F.A. No.4 Primary School (Now Po Leung Kuk Ho Sau Nan Primary School). In September, the school started 12 classes of Forms 1–3.
- In 1971, the school was formally established. After a year, the construction of the school building was finished.
- On 21 February 1973, Hong Kong's 25th Governor Sir Murray MacLehose arrived to the school site to attend the opening ceremony of the school.
- In 1988, all classrooms and special rooms are facilitated with air conditioners.
- In 1994, the school received a fund from Cheung Wing Hing Foundation. The fund was used to further improve the environment of the school. It was then renamed as 'Po Leung Kuk No.1 W. H. Cheung College' to commemorate Mr. Cheung Wing Hing's contribution.
- In 2010, the school rejected class reduction and proposed that one more new wing is to be built in the campus. In 2011, the construction was finished and the building was named "Ngan Po Ling Annex" to commemorate Ms. Ngan Po Ling's generous financial help for the construction to be possible.

== Public Examination Results ==
=== Hong Kong Certificate of Education Examination (HKCEE) ===
Po Leung Kuk No.1 W. H. Cheung College is one of the 37 secondary schools in Hong Kong that have ever produced perfect achievers of 10As (10 distinctions) in the history of Hong Kong Certificate of Education Examination (HKCEE).

Year 2000: Ho Nga Yan.

=== Hong Kong Diploma of Secondary Education Examination (HKDSE) ===
Po Leung Kuk No.1 W. H. Cheung College is one of the 46 secondary schools in Hong Kong that have ever produced "Top Scorers" in Hong Kong Diploma of Secondary Education Examination (HKDSE). "Top Scorers" are candidates who obtained perfect scores of Level 5** in each of the four core subjects and three electives. "Super Top Scorers" are Top Scorers who have also obtained an additional Level 5** in Extended Module (M1/M2) apart from a Level 5** in Mathematics Compulsory Part.

Year 2012 : Chan Sze Hoi, 8 x 5** Super Top Scorer, admitted to HKU LLB.

== School Associations ==
=== Student Association ===
Student Association (S.A.) holds a few activities each year.

=== Prefect Team ===
The Prefect Team is responsible for carrying out the school's rules.

=== The Four Houses ===
Students are sorted into four houses by the time they were first registered for a placement in the school. The four houses are Red House, Yellow House, Green House and Blue House.

== Others ==
- Po Leung Kuk's colleges share similar uniforms. As Po Leung Kuk Celine Ho Yam Tong School is located near Po Leung Kuk No.1 W. H. Cheung College, it is difficult to distinguish between the two.

== Alumni ==
Politics

- Wong Kam-sing - Former Secretary for the Environment
- Edward Yau (Yau Tang-wah) - Former Secretary for the Environment, former Director of the Chief Executive's Office of Hong Kong, and former Secretary for Commerce and Economic Development
- Gracie Foo - Former deputy director of Broadcasting
- Richard Tsoi - Former vice-chairman of the Democratic Party

Entertainment Industry

- Yumiko Cheng - singer
- Kellyjackie - singer

Business

- Kimbee Chan - CEO of Chinese Estates Holdings

== See also ==
- Po Leung Kuk Stanley Ho Sau Nan Primary School
- Po Leung Kuk Celine Ho Yam Tong College
