= Po Leung Kuk Museum =

Museum in Hong Kong

Coordinates: 22.2766°N 114.1848°E

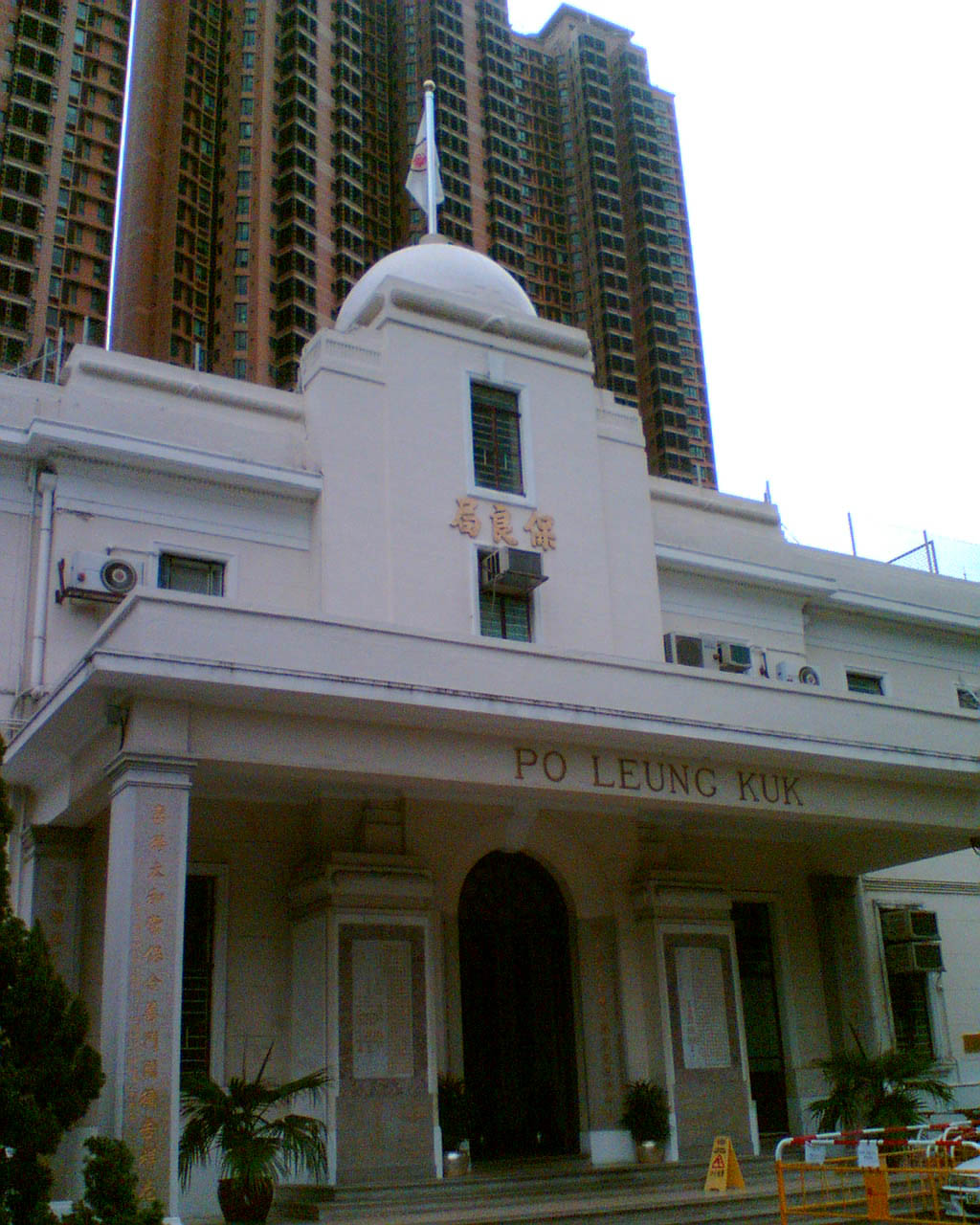
Po Leung Kuk, Main Building

The Po Leung Kuk Museum (Chinese: 保良局歷史博物館), or Po Leung Kuk Archives is a museum and an archive housed in the Main Building of Po Leung Kuk's Headquarters, located at 66 Leighton Road, Causeway Bay, Hong Kong.

The museum consists of the Old Hall, the Exhibition Hall, the Archives Office, the Research Room and two Archival Conservation Rooms. The Old Hall and the Exhibition Hall are opened to the public. The museum is free for visitors, and opened from Monday to Saturday.

The museum stores the historical documents of Po Leung Kuk. They are available upon request for the public to read.

In the late 19th century Hong Kong, kidnapping and human trafficking were rampant. On 8 November 1878, a group of Chinese merchants from Dongguan petitioned to the Governor Sir John Pope Hennessy for permission to form the "Society for the Protection of Women and Children", later known as Po Leung Kuk . Founded to protect the young and the innocent, the charity was supported by public donation and responsible for suppressing kidnapping, sheltering victims and safeguarding its residents' welfare.

In 2022, the Po Leung Kuk building and museum celebrated its 90th anniversary with a special exhibition.

In recognition of the area's history, on 8 November 2025, the museum hosted Causeway Bay Heritage Day, a programme of events for the local community.

== See also ==
- List of museums in Hong Kong
