= PLK Vicwood KT Chong Sixth Form College =

School in Hong Kong

Po Leung Kuk Vicwood K. T. Chong Sixth Form College
- 保良局莊啟程預科書院

Location
- 12 Willow Street, Tai Kok Tsui, Kowloon, Hong Kong

Information
- School type: State-maintained, Sixth Form College
- Motto: Respect Love Diligence Sincerity
- Established: 26 July 1991; 34 years ago
- Founder: Sultan Vicwood KT Chong
- School district: Prince Edward
- Superintendent: Leong On-kei
- Principal: Dr Lee Poon Shing
- Staff: 71
- Gender: Co-educational
- Enrollment: c600
- Language: English
- Color: Red
- Newspaper: KTC News
- Feeder schools: Po Leung Kuk Tong Nai Kan Junior Secondary College
- Affiliation: Po Leung Kuk
- Website: www.sfc-plk.edu.hk

Po Leung Kuk Vicwood K. T. Chong Sixth Form College
- Traditional Chinese: 保良局莊啟程預科書院
- Simplified Chinese: 保良局庄启程预科书院
Transcriptions
Standard Mandarin
- Hanyu Pinyin: Bǎo Liáng Jú Zhuāng Qǐchéng Yùkē Shūyuàn
Yue: Cantonese
- Jyutping: bou2 loeng4 guk6 zong1 kai2 cing4 jyu6 fo1 syu1 jyun2

Po Leung Kuk Vicwood K. T. Chong Sixth Form College (KTC) is a government-subsidised sixth form college in Yau Tsim Mong District, Kowloon, Hong Kong. It was established on 26 July 1991 to provide quality education to secondary pupils matriculating after Hong Kong Certificate of Education Examination to prepare pupils for the Hong Kong Advanced Level Examination. The College's continuing education sector provides adult education and once offered associate degree courses. The College also offered joint-degree courses with University of Ballarat in 1996, and University of Victoria later.

As the first and only sixth/form college in Hong Kong, it reformed its structure for the new Hong Kong Diploma of Secondary Education. It offers education to form fourth- to sixth-form pupils (24 classes). Its main feeder is Po Leung Kuk Tong Nai Kan Junior Secondary College.

The headmaster of the College is Lee Poon Shing, the former headmaster of Fukien Secondary School Affiliated School and vice-president (teaching and learning) and Dean of humanities of GT (Ellen Yeung) College. The president and supervisor is Angela Leong On-kei, who also chairs Po Leung Kuk.

== History ==
=== Establishment (1991) ===
The College was established on 26 July 1991 as a co-educational college to focus on Hong Kong A-level Examinations. It was Hong Kong's first and only government-subsidised sixth form school, on the former premises of Po Leung Kuk Wu Chung College, which had relocated to Sha Tin. In its first year, the school offered 16 disciplines. Use of English was the only compulsory module. The social sciences stream offered economics, principles of accounts, pure mathematics, business studies, and geography. Dr. Chan Siu Kui Darnay was the founding headmaster, previously having served as the head of Po Leung Kuk Tang Yuk Tien College in Tuen Mun.

It opened on 12 March 1992.

The official ceremony for graduation includes the speech days. The first speech day was held on 8 May 1993, officiated by Professor Gungwu Wang, CBE, then vice-chancellor of The University of Hong Kong. It developed into a tradition for the College's founding father, His Excellency Sultan Vicwood KT Chong (MBE, JP, Doctor of Laws), to hand out diplomas to honourable graduates.

=== Academic Excellence ===
The College became a symbol of academic excellence, with positive results in Hong Kong A-level Examinations and high admission scores. Pass rates for all subjects have never been below the Hong Kong average, while credit rates for all subjects have been significantly above those of Hong Kong's since 1995.

== Education ==
The College started offering joint-degree programmes with overseas universities such as The University of Victoria, Canada and The University of Ballarat, Australia in 1996. Then headmaster, Dr Chan, noted when he signed the agreement with the vice-chancellor of Ballarat University, Professor David James, that the College had decided upon such direction due to the qualifications of its academic team.

In 2000, the College was in preparation to add community college courses, offering associate degree courses with the first graduation held in May 2004.

== Former headmasters ==
1991–2007: Dr Darnay SK Chan

2008–2009: Mrs Iris WH Lau Lai

2009–2013: Miss ML Chik

2013–2021: Dr PS Lee, BA, MA, MEd, PGCE, PhD

2021–present: Mr Yau Man Kwong, BEd., MEd.

== Notable alumni ==
- Kellyjackie – Cantopop pop star

== See also ==
- Education in Hong Kong
