= Chinese YMCA of Hong Kong =

Charitable organization in Hong Kong

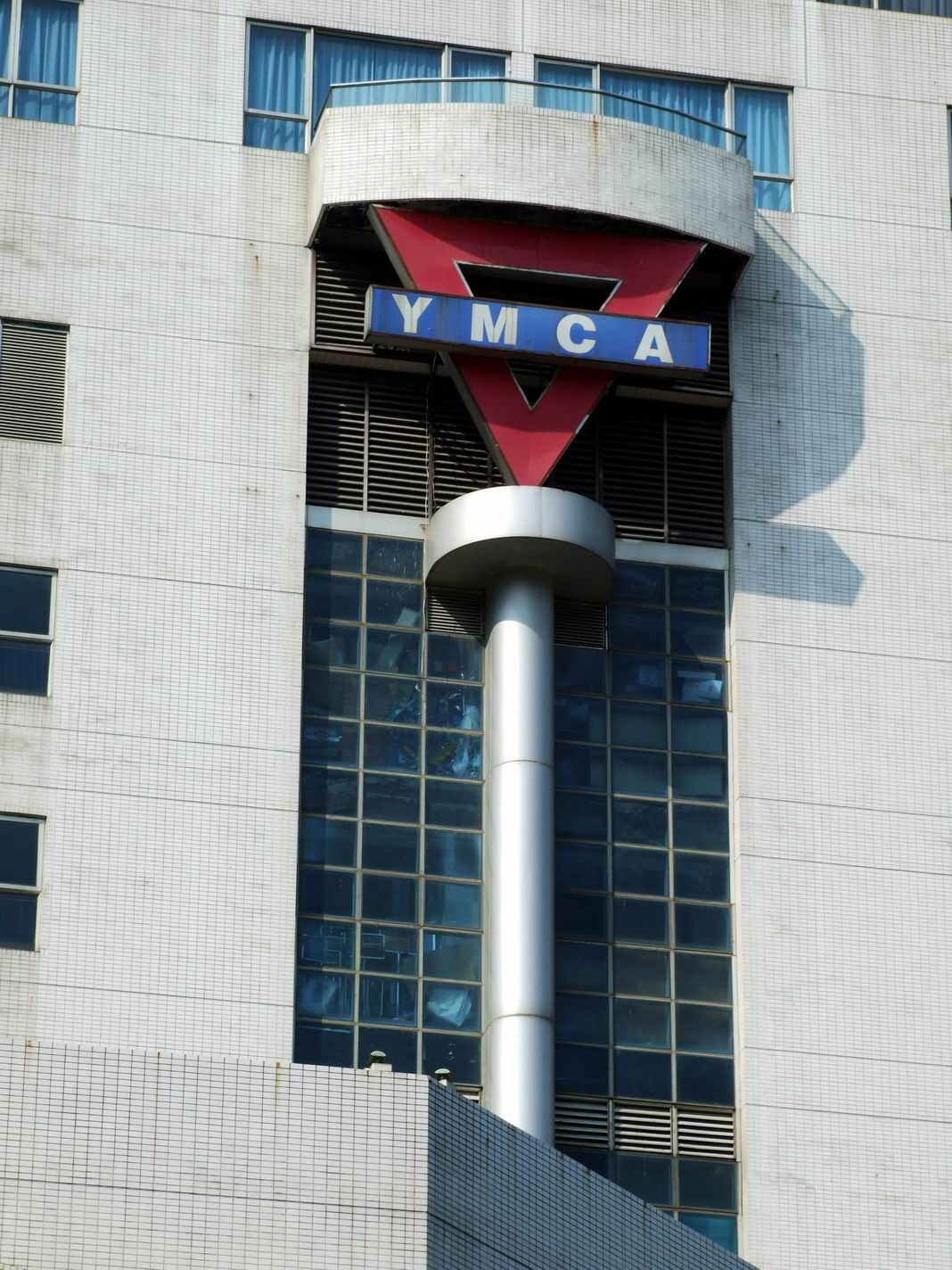
YMCA Kowloon Centre logo

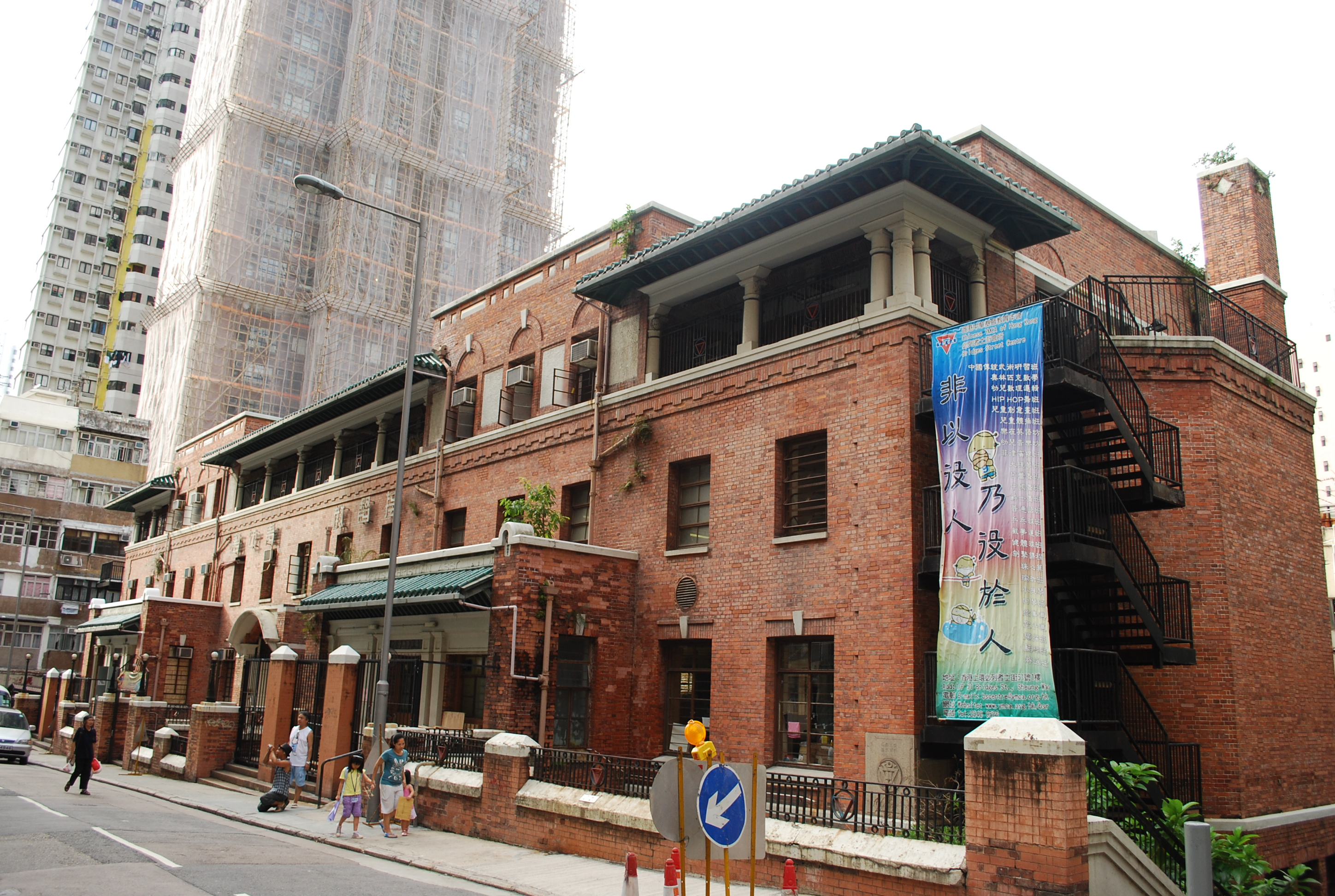
Bridges Street Centre

The Chinese YMCA of Hong Kong (Chinese: 香港中華基督教青年會) is a social and charity institution in Hong Kong. It was founded in 1901. It operates several major facilities such as the Wu Kai Sha Youth Village.

== History ==
The Chinese YMCA of Hong Kong was founded in 1918 by Fok Hing-tong, wife of Cantonese Christian businessman Ma Ying-piu. Chinese YMCA of Hong Kong is different from YMCA of Hong Kong. They are two independent organisations in Hong Kong, both traced back to the same YMCA in England but founded differently and providing different directions of service.

=== Bridges Street location ===
In 1915, architecture firm Shattuck and Hussey was hired by the Chinese YMCA to design its new Bridges Street location and construction began in 1917. The design was typical of the firm's work and indicative of the Chicago School style. It included Hong Kong's first indoor swimming pool, gymnasium with a mezzanine running track, and a variety of conference rooms.

Upon its opening, the building hosted classes, workshops and lectures for Hong Kong men. In 1941, Japanese forces gained control of the building. In 1966, Chinese YMCA relocated to Waterloo Road in Yau Ma Tei and the building was adapted for use as a hostel and educational purposes.

In 1979, Antiquities Advisory Board (AAB) gave the building a Grade II designation which was upgraded to Grade I in 2009. The building was declared a monument on October 20, 2023.

== Gallery ==
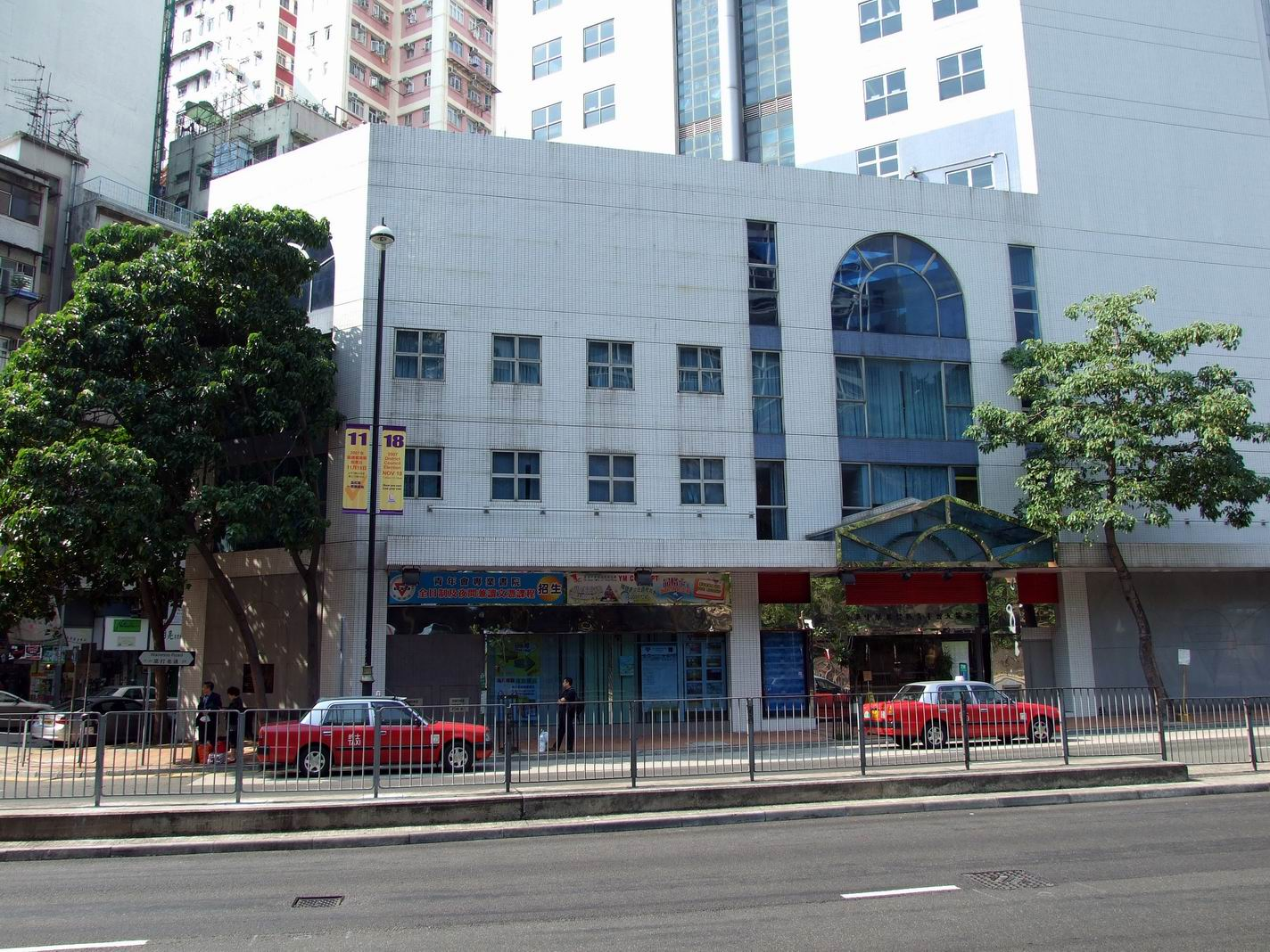
Chinese YMCA Kowloon Centre

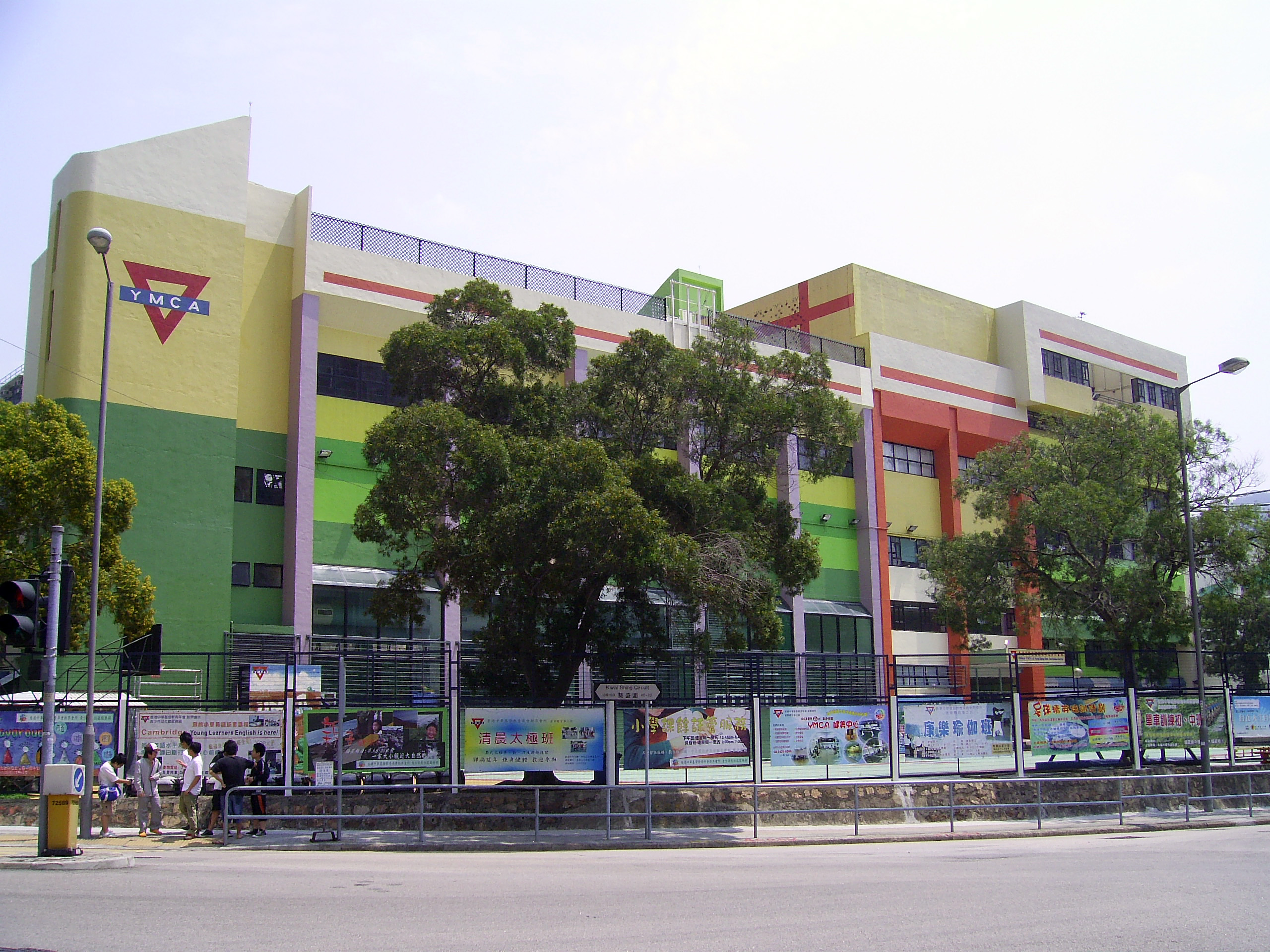
New Territories Centre

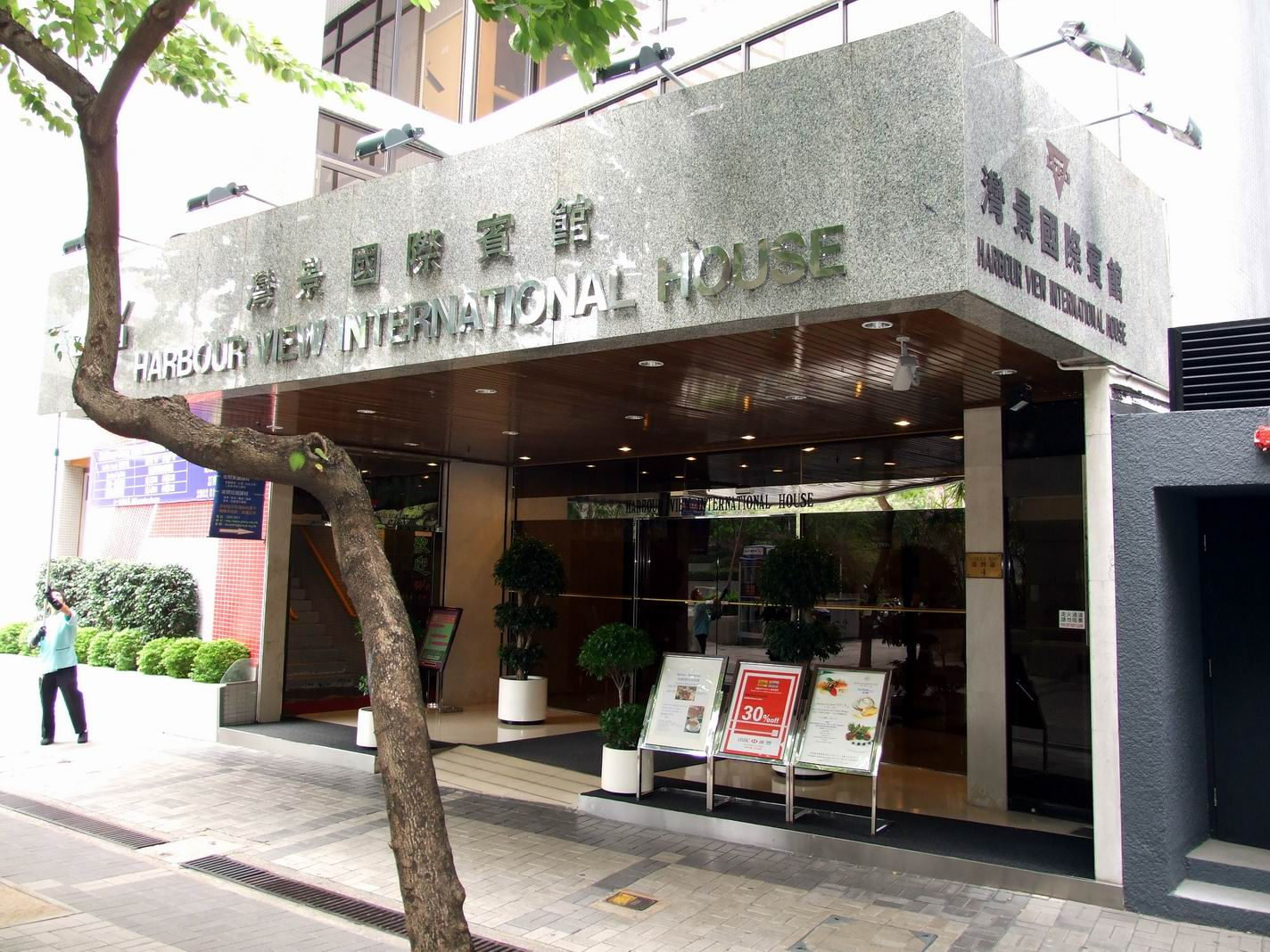
Harbourview International House hotel

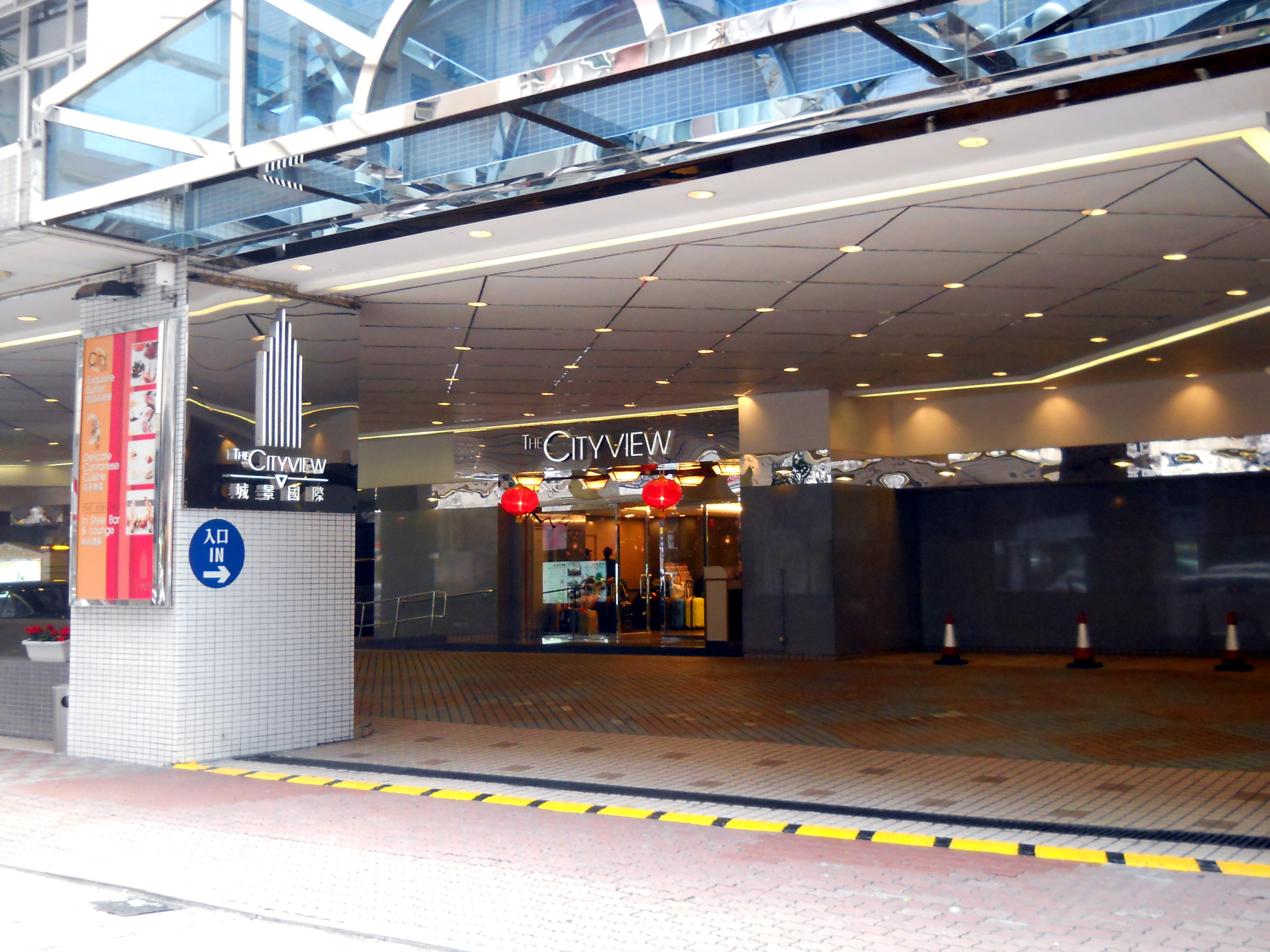
The Cityview Hotel
