= Kuala Lumpur Po Leung Kuk =

Kuala Lumpur Po Leung Kuk was a charitable organization established in 1895 in British Malaya to protect Chinese women and girls from exploitation, particularly those who were survivors of abduction or trafficking. The committee was formed under the administration of Mrs. Daly, reflecting a broader regional movement initiated by local Chinese communities across the British colonies in Asia to safeguard vulnerable individuals.

The founding of the Kuala Lumpur branch followed the establishment of the original Po Leung Kuk in Hong Kong in 1878, which was petitioned for by local Chinese residents and supported by then-Governor John Pope Hennessy to rescue kidnapped victims and protect the innocent. The principal mission of Po Leung Kuk societies throughout the region was to care for young women and uphold their safety and dignity.

== See also ==
- Singapore Po Leung Kuk
