= Mui tsai =

Term for young Chinese women who worked as domestic servants

Mui tsai (Chinese: 妹仔; Cantonese Yale: mūi jái), which means "little sister" in Cantonese, describes young Chinese women who worked as domestic servants in China, mainly in brothels or affluent households in traditional Chinese society. The young women were typically from poor families, and sold at a young age, with the condition that they be freed by marriage when older. These arrangements were generally considered as charitable and a form of adoption, as the young women would be provided for better as mui tsai than they would if they remained with their family. However, the absence of contracts in these arrangements meant that many mui tsai were resold into prostitution. According to some scholars, many of these girls ended as either concubines or prostitutes, while others write that their status was higher than a concubine's.

In traditional Chinese culture, a family needs a male offspring. Poor parents, who were unable to support many children, sometimes killed newborn infants if they were female. In consideration of poverty it was an accepted alternative to sell unwanted girls.

The practice was also prevalent before World War II in Hong Kong, Singapore and parts of Southeast Asia.

== Arab world ==
There was a long history of Chinese girls being sold to the Muslim harems in Aceh on Sumatra, where they were used as concubines (sex slaves); from Aceh, the Mui Tsai girls could be exported further for sale to Arabia. This slave trade was officially termed adoption in order to avoid scrutiny from the authorities, since the colonial powers in the Dutch East Indies had banned slavery, and it was known to continue during the Interwar period.

In 1922, Rashid Rida, editor of the progressive Egyptian newspaper al-Manar, condemned the purchase of Chinese slave girls for concubinage and denied that it should be considered as legitimate.

A report about slavery in Hejaz in the 1920s stated that Arab men considered buying concubines from a slave market as a cheaper alternative to marriage, and girls were sold for different prices depending on race, with African Ethiopian girls being sold for $100, while Christian Chinese girls were sold for $500.

During the 1930s, slavery in Yemen was given attention in the Advisory Committee of Experts on Slavery (ACE). The report to ACE about Hadhramaut described the existence of Chinese girls trafficked from Singapore for enslavement as concubines, Indian women trafficked to Hadrhamaut to be sold by their husbands, and Indian children officially taken there for religious studies, only to be sold upon arrival. The British tried to convince the coastal local rulers of the Aden Protectorate to sign an agreement to ban the slave trade, but by January 1939, few had done so.

== Hong Kong ==
During the mid-19th century, the British Slavery Abolition Act 1833 and Slave Trade Act 1807 were enacted. Before 1923, the Hong Kong government did not impose any restrictions on the transfer of girls as mui tsais, as this was treated as a family matter or traditional custom. Kathleen Simon, Viscountess Simon, fought for several decades to free the remaining mui tsai.

In 1922, after press campaigns in Britain and support from MPs (including John Ward in the House of Commons), the Secretary of State for the Colonies Winston Churchill, pledged that the mui tsai system in Hong Kong would be abolished within one year. Under pressure from the British Parliament, the Legislative Council of Hong Kong enacted the Female Domestic Service Bill the next year, prohibiting further importations and transfers of mui tsais. The demand for registration of all mui tsais, however, was postponed. The new law was never seriously observed.

The mui tsai issue soon came under international scrutiny. Facing strong political pressure, the Hong Kong government enacted the Female Domestic Service Ordinance in 1923. All mui tsais had to be registered prior to 31 May 1930. Afterwards, no registration and thus no sale was allowed. Inspectors were appointed to pay visits to the mui tsais to ensure that they were not ill-treated and had had their wages paid.

The report of slavery in China to the Temporary Slavery Commission (TSC) of 1924-1926 described the Mui Tsai trade in girls, which was a matter given international attention at this time. Hong Kong refused to provide any information with the motivation that there was no slavery in Hong Kong. In 1926, Britain became one of the signatories to the International Slavery Convention of the League of Nations.

The latest case was reported in 2005. Chinese parents received a financial relief for their daughter who was transferred to Hong Kong. She worked incessantly from dawn to dusk. After physical tortures she was admitted to the hospital.

== Macau ==
In the 16th century it was a common practice in Macau for poor families to sell daughters as domestic servants for 40 years. As the Portuguese settled in Macau they began to establish brothels with mui tsais, but the Mandarins intervened.

== United States ==
In the 19th century a large number of Chinese workers immigrated to the United States. The Chinese Exclusion Act of 1882 prevented Chinese men of the working class from sending for wives from China nor did the law permit them to marry non-Chinese wives in some states. Now many Chinese girls and young women immigrated with false papers showing them to be the wives or daughters of the privileged class. Most of them arrived at Angel Island in the San Francisco Bay. The girls were sold for household servants. As they got older, they were frequently sold into prostitution. Mui tsais became a target for Protestant reformers in San Francisco. The Presbyterian Mission House in San Francisco's Chinatown rescued Chinese girls and women from abusive circumstances.

Despite the work of reformers in the United States, the mui tsai system continued into the early 20th century.

== South East Asia ==
There was a long history of Chinese girls being sold to the Muslim harems in Aceh on Sumatra, where they were used as concubines (sex slaves). This slave trade were officially called adoptions in order to avoid scrutiny from the authorities, since the colonial powers in the Dutch East Indies had banned slavery, and it was known to continue during the Interwar period.

== See also ==
- Anti-Mui Tsai Activism
- Anti-Mui Tsai Society
- Chinese American history
- Restavek (a similar system in Haiti)
