= Opposition to mui tsai =

Beginning in the late 1800s, there were a number of attempts to abolish the mui tsai system. Mui tsai (Chinese: 妹仔; Cantonese Yale: mūi jái; lit. 'little sister') describes Chinese girls who were purchased at a young age by affluent Chinese households to work as domestic servants, and who would later be married off or sold to brothels. The mui tsai system spread to other parts of the world through immigration and colonization, causing it to become a human rights issue in countries such as Great Britain and America.

== History ==
During the early 1910s, mui tsai was discussed by British government officials and activists. They confirmed that the mui tsai system was a form of slavery. After the 1911 revolution, the system was banned in China but this was never effectively enforced. In 1917, the mui tsai issue reemerged because of a legal case involving two mui tsai who had been kidnapped. A British member of Parliament who happened to be passing through town took the case to the Colonial Office. He questioned how slavery could not only be tolerated but could even be protected by law in the British Empire.

In the 1920s and 1930s, there was an increased interest in social welfare. This led to the debates about prostitution and mui tsai. When the British occupied Hong Kong in 1841 (British Hong Kong), they proclaimed that the Chinese would be governed according to their own laws and customs. This had been the position of the colonial government on the question anti-mui tsai groups pushed it to change. Chinese activists in Hong Kong, including Christians who were educated abroad, labor organizers, feminists and members of the Hong Kong Anti-Mui Tsai Society were involved in the debate of prostitution and mui tsai.

=== Anti-Mui Tsai Campaign ===
By 1920, a campaign against mui tsai was created by European missionaries and Christian Chinese. The Anti-Mui Tsai Campaign had three main differences from that of the 1880s. It focused more on the system itself rather than prostitution. This time, the campaign had help from different places: British women in Hong Kong, small groups of local Chinese members of Parliament in Britain, religious leaders, and international women's groups. The Colonial Office started to receive complaints from these groups.

=== Anti-Mui Tsai Society ===
In July 1921, local elites held a meeting at the Tai Ping Theatre and created "The Society for the Protection of Mui Tsai". The Anti-Mui Tsai Society was formed after the meeting in opposition. The Anti-Mui Tsai Society wrote a manifesto following the meeting. The manifesto states that the system was injurious to public morality, it was subversive of righteousness, and it was damaging to the national body (dasun guoti). The manifesto mentioned that representatives of Europe and America had met in Berlin in 1885 and outlawed the slave trade. Therefore, it would be damaging to the Chinese national body to continue such trade within or outside the country.

The Anti-Mui Tsai Society was dissatisfied with reform since it could not remove the root cause of the problem. Revelations by the Anti-Mui Tsai Society about the ongoing abuse of mui tsai caused international observers to become interested in the issue. They received backing from local groups such as the Young Women's Christian Association and was able to gain support from the foreign community and many labor unions. English secretary C.G. Anderson supported the society and helped by writing to the newspapers in Hong Kong and Britain.

=== Legislation ===
In February 1922, the Anti-Slavery Society organized a conference of twenty-two societies to discuss the matter of mui tsai. A week later, the Secretary for the Colonies Winston Churchill argued to the House of Commons that the system should be abolished.

A meeting was held on January 15, 1923. The chairman of the Chinese Seamen's Union participated and showed willingness to adopt the mui tsai question as a labor issue. The Female Domestic Service Ordinance was passed in 1923. The mui tsai issue reemerged after the Canton government abolished all forms of slavery in March 1927. In October 1928, the Anti-Mui Tsai Society declared that conditions had become worse since 1923 and sent details to groups in Britain. The bill eventually prohibited any new mui tsai transactions and domestic service for girls under ten years of age. When the secretary of the Anti-Slavery and Aborigines Protection Society learned about the situation, letters were written to the Manchester Guardian that was soon published. Many British activists who had been involved in the campaign in the early 1920s resurfaced. They distributed articles with titles such as "Little Yellow Slaves under the Union Jack". Further agitation began when the practice was outlawed in neighboring Guangdong Province the same year. This caused the Anti-Mui Tsai Society to become even more upset about the issue remaining unsolved in their province.

In 1929, in response to pressure from Anti-Mui Tsai groups, the Legislative Council passed an amendment stating that mui tsai were to be registered and paid wages. The new colonial secretary, Passfield, told Clementi to put Part III of the 1923 ordinance into immediate effect and send six monthly reports on the progress. All mui tsai had to be registered before June 1, 1930 and further imports were forbidden. 4,268 girls were registered. The Anti-Mui Tsai Society claimed that fewer than half of the mui tsai was actually registered. In July 1931, Passfield appointed a police inspector and two Chinese women inspectors to help register mui tsai.

==== End of the anti-mui tsai Movement ====
The Anti-Mui Tsai Society disbanded in the 1930s. British charitable groups took over its cause and successfully pushed Parliament to enact reforms. Since the conclusion of the anti-mui tsai movement in the 1930s, the political power of the three parties: the colonial government, the Chinese elites (as previously represented by the Kuk), and Chinese Christians (including women) has changed greatly. In April 1938, the Legislative Council passed legislation making it mandatory to register all adopted girls with the secretary for Chinese affairs.

== International involvement ==
=== Clara and Hugh Haslewood ===
In August 1919 Clara Haslewood and her husband Hugh, a retired Royal Navy lieutenant-commander moved to Hong Kong. In November of the same year, Haslewood wrote several letters criticizing the mui tsai system and her writings were published by four newspapers. The attention these letters gained led reactionary governor, Sir Reginald Stubbs to have the Admiralty transfer Haslewood's husband. After returning to Britain, Haslewood continued to oppose the mui tsai system by speaking out in the press and writing to members of Parliament. In 1930, Clara and Hughe Haslewood published their book Child Slavery in Hong Kong: The Mui Tsai System in which the mui tsai system was likened to slavery. After the mui tsai system gained awareness internationally, the Anti-Slavery and Aborigines Protection Society, the Fabian Society, the International Woman Suffrage Alliance, and the League of Nations began pressuring the Colonial Office to put an end to the practice.

=== Female Domestic Service Bill ===
The Secretary of State of the Colonies, Winston Churchill supported the anti-mui tsai movement and in 1922, he pledged to the House of Commons that within a year the practice would be ended. In 1923, the Female Domestic Service Bill banning the importing and transferring of mui tsai was established by the Hong Kong Legislative Council under the British Parliament. In a letter published by the Manchester Guardian in 1929, Churchill was criticized for being unable to fully abolishing the mui tsai system. Later that year, the Female Domestic Service (Amendment) Ordinance was enacted requiring all mui tsai to be registered. However, the mui tsai system continued because girls were acquired as adopted daughters in order to circumvent the mandatory registration. This led to an Ordinance in 1938 which required all adopted girls to be registered as well. By preventing the trading of mui tsai and recording adoptions, as existing mui tsai grew old enough to marry, the system was expected to eventually come to an end.

=== 1926 Slavery Convention ===
The Convention to Suppress the Slave Trade and Slavery known as the 1926 Slavery Convention is an international treaty formed under the League of Nations. The Convention was signed on September 25, 1926 and on March 9, 1927 it was entered into the League of Nations Treaty Series. It was the result of the Temporary Slavery Commission (TSC) of 1924-1926, which had addressed the Mui Tsai trade in girls in China, which was a matter given international attention at this point.

The treaty established articles and rules banning slave trade and slavery. Britain was a signatory of the Convention, bringing international attention to anti-mui tsai efforts.

== Organizations ==
Po Leung Kuk organization emblem.

=== Po Leung Kuk ===
Po Leung Kuk, also known as the Society for the Protection of Women and Children, is an organization founded on November 8, 1878. In the past, the organization helped poor women and children, prevented kidnappings, and assisted in complex family and marriage issues. Currently, the organization aids the community and its members by providing various services and welfare coverage.

=== Chinese Christians in Hong Kong ===
The anti-mui tsai movement in 1921 was the first time the Chinese Christians worked collectively to campaign for social change. The Anti-Mui Tsai Society consisted of members from churches, YMCA, YWCA, and labor unions. Their objective was the liberation of all mui tsai and the abolition of the system. The active role women took in the campaigns contributed greatly to the movement. Chinese Christian women utilized the Western presence of missionaries to gain access to international resources which ultimately created a sense of agency between the two. Through their participation in public debates regarding issues of family and women, a new view of Chinese culture and custom was produced.

=== Women’s Rights Advocates ===
==== Mrs. Ma Huo Qingtang (Fok Hing Tong) ====
In 1920 she became a founder of the Chinese YWCA (Young Women's Christian Association) of Hong Kong along with Fok Shui Yue, Katherine S.C. Woo (Woo Suzhen), and Mrs. So Pui Kau (Su Peiqiu). She served as director and managed the association throughout the early to mid-1900s. Records show that she recruited the most members and also raised the largest amount of donations during her time at the YWCA. Mrs. Ma's Christian faith allowed her to detach from old standards and values and challenge tradition through her involvement in the anti-mui tsai movement.

==== Stella Benson and Gladys Forster ====
Stella Benson and Gladys Foster were women's rights activist who were a part of a women's club called the Helena May. The Helena May Institute, established by the wife of governor Sir Henry May, was opened on September 12, 1916. The organization was created to provide support and guidance for women in Hong Kong. While being active members in the Helena May, Benson and Forster campaigned against licensed prostitution and sexual slavery. They worked with the local League of Nations subcommittee which Forster chaired in December 1930. Together they conducted research and worked to spread awareness about the conditions endured by young girls who were being traded as slaves.

== In popular culture ==
Silver Spoon, Sterling Shackles (Chinese: 名媛望族; Cantonese Yale: ming4 wun4 mong6 juk6; lit. 'famous women of prominent family') is a 2012 Hong Kong television drama produced by Television Broadcasts Limited (TVB). It follows the story of a wealthy family in 1930s Hong Kong dealing with tensions as feminist activists are pushing for women's rights seeking to rid the idea that men are superior to women. In episode 23 of the drama, a press conference is held where people voice their opposing opinions about the mui tsai system.

== Effects of Anti-Mui Tsai Society in other countries ==
=== Hong Kong ===
In 1879, the Chief Justice of the Hong Kong Supreme Court wrote that the mui tsai system was no different from slavery. The British government still did not take any action. The reason being, they feared it would destabilize Hong Kong society. During the 80 years of the colony's history, no steps were taken to try to abolish. When the International Covenant on Civil and Political Rights (ICCPR), Hong Kong began forming Human Rights laws around human trafficking. However, the mui tsai seemed to be neglected under the law due to the cultural influence of what it means to be mui tsai. Often seen as charitable to be mui tsai, targeting the system similarly to other forms of human trafficking proved more complex and difficult. Thus, intervention relies more on the anti-mui tsai activists and other NGOs. With Hong Kong's anti-human trafficking laws still being discussed in 2018, where mui tsai comes in between the current human rights laws and modern slavery acts in Hong Kong remains not entirely clear.

=== Britain ===
The mui tsai system was a commonly occurring issue for Britain when the country had a wide spread empire in the Asiatic regions. In the 1920s human rights was becoming a topic of interest in Great Britain.Policies put in place by Winston Churchill, the Secretary of State for the Colonies, targeted social issues in British colonies. British news sources at the time kept mainland Britain updated on the status of mui tsai abolitionism in Hong Kong. Through these newspapers, the British public could identify mui tsai as a child slavery issue into the 1930s. Soon after, the public would pressure parliament for more higher human rights standards to be placed all around the British Empire. The mui tsai system was known to be active in the British Crown Colony in Hong Kong anti-mui tsai still exercises activism in these regions after separation from the British Empire. In 1926, Britain became one of the signatories to the International Slavery Convention under the League of Nations. The mui tsai issue soon came under international scrutiny. Sino-British relations still discuss the state of human rights in China including human trafficking. However, government dialogue on the remaining mui tsai is sparse, and British anti-mui tsai communities seem non existent.

=== Other Settlements: Macau and Malaysia ===
Macau initially saw the rise of the mui tsai system in the 16th century similarly to mainland China in impoverished situations. Anti-mui tsai activism rose after the intervention of the Mandarins. However, opposition to mui tsai became more widespread in later years when targeting the still existing practices of mui tsai and human trafficking in mainland China. The spread of mui tsai to other parts of Asia and the world through Chinese diaspora aided in its abolition, and in raising the awareness of the wider issue of child welfare. Similarly to the mui tsai tradition in the Chinese countryside, the system took to poorer provinces that existed more in the 19th and 20th centuries.

=== United States ===
At the start 19th Century Sino-U.S. maritime relations began the immigration of Chinese people to America and the starting of Chinese American communities. Most early Chinese immigrants to the United States borrowed money from their relatives and used the bulk of their savings at home for their journey. Although some had communities to work and make money in, poverty was common in early Chinese-American communities. This environment of poor and culture shocked Chinese immigrants made a breeding ground for the mui tsai system. Interest and activism for human rights was not very evident at the time of the mui tsai system's American start, especially in immigrant communities. Human rights as a topic in America would not take off until the 1900s leaving mui tsai out of public common knowledge. These immigrant communities had little to no access to education and political voice, hindering their ability to bring mui tsai and systematic slavery with in their communities into public eye if so desired. Also, activists within other areas, such as feminism, would struggle to understand and communicate with communities still practicing mui tsai into the 20th century. The overall cultural attitude within mui tsai practicing communities would isolate the issue from intervention. When both Christians and Protestants began targeting mui tsai in San Francisco, the issue of this kind of child slavery became more recognized by non-Chinese American communities. Into the late 1900s Chinese American communities and people gained better socioeconomic status, weakening the tradition as 2nd and 3rd generation Chinese Americans would not carry on the system and tradition. Today the opposition to mui tsai and human trafficking reaches the United States in international human rights discussion.

== Current issues ==
Although the mui tsai question has been dealt with through legislation, some of the issues are still current. The courts frequently hear cases of cruelty to domestic helpers, punished by employers who still believe their maids belong to them. There are elderly women alive in Hong Kong who were sold into servitude as infants. While this was mostly done out of desperate poverty, deeply seated cultural prejudices against girls also played a key role. Despite the introduction of legal safeguards for women on the mainland in the 20s, and massive advance since, attitudes towards women in rural areas remain primitive. According to reports, rural midwives continue to drown female infants at birth on the instructions of mothers-in-law. Orphanages these days are also mostly filled with girls who one would have been sold as mui tsai.

=== Case Reports ===
An 11-year-old girl was admitted to Tuen Mun Hospital in April 2005 for evaluation of suspected child abuse. From the age of 8, she had been working in the home of her relatives to scrape a living for her family. At 10 years old, she was sent to Hong Kong to stay with her aunt on a visitor's visa. Her parents were able to receive money as financial relief. However, the aunt did not allow the child to telephone or go back home even after her visitor's visa expired. The child worked as a servant in the aunt's home. She was forced to sleep on the floor and had meals after everyone else was finished. The child had to prepare meals, wash dishes, do laundry, shop for food, clean furniture, and mop the floor. She was given no rest breaks and was subject to physical punishments. Punishments included kicking and beating with a slipper, pricking with a pair of pliers, and spanking with a rod. Despite her injuries, she was never given any medical attention. The child's repeated injuries soon attracted the attention of a supermarket staff and the staff finally decided to report the case to the police.

This report bears a remarkable resemblance to that of a mui tsai. The girl was transferred from a poor family in Mainland China into Hong Kong for servitude following a financial transaction. However, this case was distinguished from previous accounts of mui tsai because there was a blood tie between the mistress and servant. Moreover, the child travelled to Hong Kong with valid documents. Therefore, the perpetrator was not charged.

Although the mui tsai system is no longer accepted, many of the factors underlying its development such as poverty and son preference or discriminations against the female gender are still prevalent. With the return of authority over Hong Kong to the People's’ Republic of China in 1997, there has been a closer economic link between the Special Administrative Region and the Mainland. Furthermore, traveling over the borders has been made easier. As a result, such changes may have facilitated the emergence of new forms of child victimization in Hong Kong. Child abuse crossing the Hong Kong-China border presents new challenges since offenses committed outside the Special Administrative Region are not under Hong Kong jurisdiction. Therefore, investigation of suspected abuse case is often incomplete or impossible. To make matters worse, children who are residents of the Mainland will be repatriated and there are no formal channels for the follow-up of the victims and their families. The social services provided by no -government organization in Mainland china offer a possible way for child protection agencies in Hong Kong to monitor the wellbeing of the victims, but the effectiveness of this kind of monitoring is still uncertain

== See also ==
- Silver Spoon, Sterling Shackles
