= Sincere Department Store =

Hong Kong department store chain

- Native name: 先施百貨
- Type: Public trading company
- Industry: Fashion retailing
- Founded: 8 January 1900
- Founder: 25 investors including Ma Ying Piu
- Headquarters: Hong Kong
- Area served: Hong Kong and Mainland China
- Key people: Chairman Walter K.W. Ma,Managing Director/Executive Director Philip K.H. Ma and board member King Wing Ma
- Products: Consumer goods and services
- Services: Retail, advertising, travel
- Revenue: HKD 458 million (2011)
- Net income: HKD 10.2 million (2011)
- Owner: Ma family
- Number of employees: 587
- Parent: Sincere Group
- Divisions: 5
- Subsidiaries: 360 °C Advertising, Pacific Falcon Design, Sincere Living Furniture
- Website: Sincere

Sincere Department Store (Chinese: 先施百貨; pinyin: Xiānshī Bǎihuò; Wade–Giles: Hsien-shih Pai-huo; Jyutping: sin1 si1 baak3fo3) is a department store under the Sincere Company Limited and one of the oldest department chains in Hong Kong. Prior to 1949, its largest operation was in Shanghai, and along with Wing On (which survives in Hong Kong), Sun Sun (新新公司 1926–1951) and Da Sun (大新公司) was one of the "four great department stores" of Shanghai, and therefore, China generally.

== History ==
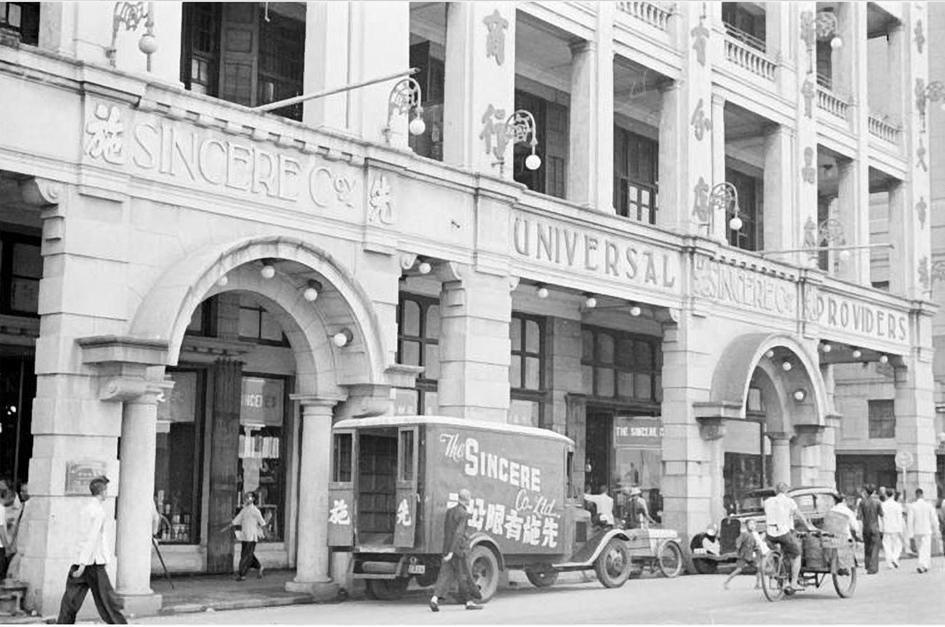
A Sincere store in Central, Hong Kong, circa 1941.

Founded by Hong Kong businessman Ma Ying-piu on 8 January 1900 after returning from Australia and partnership with others to form the first Chinese department store in then British Hong Kong. Ma was inspired by his experience with retail stores in Sydney. and modelled Sincere after David Jones. Now, the company is owned by the Ma family.

Sincere's Shanghai branch, operated from 1917 to 1954, was the first Hongkonger-owned Western style department store and the first of the "Four Great Companies". Ma Ying-piu brought the model of modern department stores with egalitarian service pioneered by Anthony Hordern & Sons to Shanghai and quickly became the focal points of Shanghai's commercial district.

Prior to World War II, Sincere operated in China with stores in Shanghai, Nanning and Guangzhou. The Guangzhou store was destroyed by enemy fire during the war. With the founding of the People's Republic of China in 1949 the remaining locations were eventually taken over by the Communist state, along with all other private companies in the country. The Shanghai department store closed in 1954 while the attached hotel was part nationalised in 1956.

Sincere returned to mainland China in 1993 by opening a shopping centre at 479 East Nanjing Road in Shanghai.

On 15 May 2020, Realord Group Holdings Limited proposed a voluntary conditional general cash offer to acquire the entire share capital of The Sincere Company Limited. The total cash consideration would be $500 million.

== Post 1997 ==
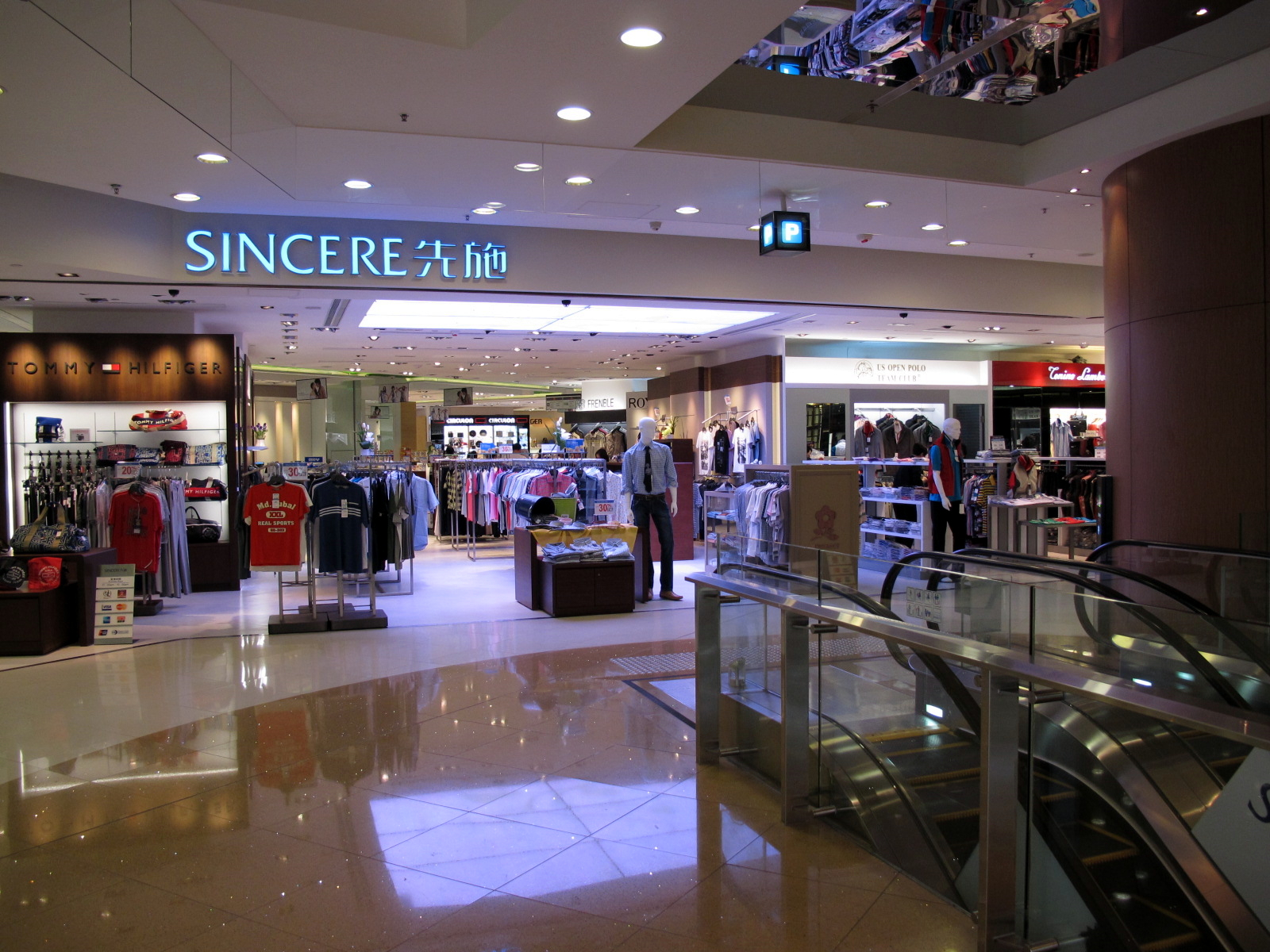
Sincere store in Citywalk, Tsuen Wan in 2011

Since 1997, Sincere's retailing arm is mostly in Hong Kong with four locations in Hong Kong (Central: Li Po Chun Chambers; Causeway Bay: Percival Street) and Kowloon (Mong Kok: Grand Century Place; Mong Kok: King Wah Centre; Sham Shui Po: Dragon Centre; Yau Tong: Domain; and Tsuen Wan: Citywalk 2); there are Chinese location, including Dalian. The Ma family still has a place on the corporate board (chairman Walter K.W. Ma, managing director/executive director Philip K.H. Ma and board member King Wing Ma), but most day-to-day operations are run by non-family executives. Sincere is one of a few department stores that survived, many foreign and local firms have since disappeared. It has been announced that Sincere Department Stores will cease trading by the end of the year 2025 due to economic challenges.

== Beyond retailing ==
Today Sincere has grown beyond retailing and diversified its portfolio:

property investment and property development

- securities trading
- advertising agency – 360 °C Advertising
- interior design – Pacific Falcon Design
- furniture manufacturing – Sincere Living Furniture
- travel agency franchising – Uniglobe Travel
