= Scrabble in Hong Kong =

There are Scrabble competitions for students and the public in Hong Kong.

== National Association ==
In July 2015, Hong Kong Student Scrabble Players Association (HKSSPA) announced that it has been accepted as a member association of World English-Language Scrabble Players' Association (WESPA), becoming Hong Kong's national association for Scrabble.

In November 2015, HKSSPA changed its name to Hong Kong Scrabble Players Association (HKSPA).

== Hong Kong Scrabble Championship ==
The Hong Kong Scrabble Championship (formerly known as the Hong Kong National Scrabble Championship) is the premier domestic Scrabble tournament in Hong Kong. Organised annually by the Hong Kong Scrabble Players Association (HKSPA), the tournament determines the official Hong Kong Scrabble Champion and the winner of the coveted Lion Rock Trophy. The competition frequently serves as a qualifier for international events, such as the WESPA Championship.

=== Format and Divisions ===
The Championship typically employs a multi-division structure to accommodate players of different skill levels, categorized by their peak HKSPA ratings. Division A is the top flight—usually contested over a grueling 18-game, two-day format—where the overall champion is crowned. The tournament heavily incorporates the Australian Swiss Draw system, culminating in King-of-the-Hill (KOTH) pairings for the final rounds. Alongside the main championship, the tournament places a strong emphasis on youth development, distributing various age-group awards (e.g., Best Under-18, Under-16, Under-14) and recognizing the "Best Player from a School" and team unities.

=== History ===
==== 2016–2019: Inaugural Tournaments and Early Champions ====
The inaugural tournament was held in April 2016, marking a significant milestone for the local competitive Scrabble community. The first event attracted 76 participants, and Carson Ip was crowned the first-ever Hong Kong Scrabble Champion. Ip successfully defended his title the following year in 2017.

In 2018, Euclid Hui captured his first national championship title. The tournament made history again in 2019 when Brian Po emerged victorious. Competing in a fiercely contested 18-game format, Po became the first youth player (Under-18) to win the overall Hong Kong Scrabble Champion title.

==== 2020–Present: Pandemic Disruptions and Hui's Dominance ====
The outbreak of the COVID-19 pandemic heavily disrupted the local Scrabble calendar, leading to the cancellation of the 2020 Championship. The tournament returned in May 2021 under strict infection control measures, utilizing a single-division format restricted to 16 top-tier players. Euclid Hui dominated the 2021 tournament, going undefeated with a cumulative spread of +1969 to claim his second title.

Hui's dominance continued as the tournament resumed its traditional multi-division format in the post-pandemic era. He successfully defended his title in both 2022 and 2023, establishing a three-tournament winning streak. In 2024, top-rated player Thomson Law Long Yin broke the streak to secure his first national championship. However, Euclid Hui returned to the top of the podium in 2025, reclaiming the title and cementing his status as the most decorated player in the tournament's history with a record five championship victories.

=== List of Champions ===
Year	Champion
2026	Thomson Law Long Yin
2025	Euclid Hui
2024	Thomson Law Long Yin
2023	Euclid Hui
2022	Euclid Hui
2021	Euclid Hui
2020	(Cancelled due to the COVID-19 pandemic)
2019	Brian Po
2018	Euclid Hui
2017	Carson Ip
2016	Carson Ip

Winners by number of times : Euclid Hui (5), Carson Ip (2), Thomson Law Long Yin (2), Brian Po (1)

== Hong Kong Scrabble Challenge ==
The Hong Kong Scrabble Challenge is an annual international open Scrabble tournament organized by the Hong Kong Scrabble Players Association (HKSPA). Established to bridge the skill gap between local competitors and overseas talents, the top divisions of the tournament are rated by the World English-Language Scrabble Players' Association (WESPA).

=== Inception and Early Years (2015–2017) ===
The inaugural Hong Kong Scrabble Challenge took place on August 2–3, 2015. It was organized alongside a Scrabble workshop hosted by renowned international players. The inaugural event drew 34 competitors from Hong Kong, Malaysia, Singapore, and the United States, with Singaporean player Liew Kian Boon crowned the first-ever champion.

In 2016, the tournament expanded into a two-day structure consisting of a Main Event open to all players and an invitational Extra Event. This format continued into 2017, which attracted 81 participants from across the region, including representatives from Hong Kong, Japan, Malaysia, Singapore, and Thailand. Singaporean players dominated the 2017 edition, with Michael Tang winning the Main tournament and former World Youth Scrabble Champion Toh Weibin claiming the Extra tournament.

=== Anniversary Event and Format Evolution (2018–2019) ===
To celebrate the 70th anniversary of the invention of Scrabble in 2018, the event was temporarily rebranded as the "Scrabble Seventy Years Hong Kong Challenge." Co-organized with Mattel Games Hong Kong, the tournament waived its entry fees for all local and overseas players to promote the game and encourage international participation.

In 2019, the competition structure evolved to feature multiple divisions based on HKSPA and WESPA peak player ratings. The top tier (Division A) expanded the gameplay to a grueling 17-game format played over two days.

=== Modern Era (2020–Present) ===
In the post-pandemic era, the tournament has standardized its format to feature 15 WESPA-rated games. The gameplay mechanics generally incorporate initial random draws, the Australian Swiss Draw system, and King-of-the-Hill (KOTH) pairings to decide the final rounds. Qualification requirements have also been formalized, generally requiring local players to maintain an HKSPA rating of 800 or above, while overseas entrants must possess an official WESPA rating.

While the early editions of the Challenge were largely won by visiting international players, local Hong Kong players have increasingly secured the championship title in recent years, with top local representatives Euclid Hui and Thomson Law Long Yin winning the tournament in 2024 and 2025, respectively.

== Inter-School Scrabble Championship ==
In Hong Kong, Mattel and Broadlearning organize the Inter-School Scrabble Championship for primary schools and secondary schools' students every year starting from 2003. However, the championship was not held in 2011 and 2014.

In 2015, Hong Kong Student Scrabble Players Association (HKSSPA) organises the Inter-School Scrabble Championship 2015, including Primary and Secondary Category.

HKSPA continues to organise the Inter-School Scrabble Championship in 2016 with 4 categories, namely Primary (Novice), Secondary (Novice), Primary (Open) and Secondary (Open).

In 2017, HKSPA cooperated with the Headstart Group to organise the Secondary Category of the Championship, which was called "Headstart Cup" Hong Kong Inter-Secondary School Scrabble Championship. HKSPA continued to organise the Primary Category of the Championship.

Year	Senior Secondary Champion	Junior Secondary Champion	Primary Champion
2026	Methodist College		W F Joseph Lee Primary School
2025	Methodist College		W F Joseph Lee Primary School
2024	SKH Tsang Shiu Tim Secondary School		W F Joseph Lee Primary School
2023	SKH Tsang Shiu Tim Secondary School		W F Joseph Lee Primary School
2022	HKSPA did not organise the Championship due to the pandemic		
2021	HKSPA did not organise the Championship due to the pandemic		
2020	HKSPA did not organise the Championship due to the pandemic		
2019	Methodist College		Lok Wah Catholic Primary School
2018	CCC Mong Man Wai College		Ho Lap Primary School (Sponsored by Sik Sik Yuen)
2017	Methodist College		Lok Wah Catholic Primary School
2016	Methodist College		S.K.H. St. Michael's Primary School
2015	CCC Mong Man Wai College		S.K.H. St. Michael's Primary School
2014	Mattel and Broadlearning did not organise the Championship		
2013	Ho Lap College (Sponsored by the Sik Sik Yuen)		S.K.H. St. Michael's Primary School
2012	Ho Lap College (Sponsored by the Sik Sik Yuen)		S.K.H. St. Michael's Primary School
2011	Mattel and Broadlearning did not organise the Championship		
2010	St. Mark's School	Ho Lap College (Sponsored by the Sik Sik Yuen)	S.K.H. St. Michael's Primary School
2009	Nil	Ho Lap College (Sponsored by the Sik Sik Yuen)	S.K.H. St. Michael's Primary School
2008	Ho Lap College (Sponsored by the Sik Sik Yuen)	St. Mark's School	Ng Wah Catholic Primary School
2007	Ho Lap College (Sponsored by the Sik Sik Yuen)	Ho Lap College (Sponsored by the Sik Sik Yuen)	S.K.H. St. Michael's Primary School
2006	Ho Lap College (Sponsored by the Sik Sik Yuen)		Pui Ching Primary School
2005	Ho Lap College (Sponsored by the Sik Sik Yuen)		Pui Ching Primary School
2004	Ho Lap College (Sponsored by the Sik Sik Yuen)		S.K.H. St. Michael's Primary School

Winners by number of times

Secondary Category: Ho Lap College (Sponsored by the Sik Sik Yuen) (10), Methodist College (5), St. Mark's School (2), CCC Mong Man Wai College (2), SKH Tsang Shiu Tim Secondary School (2)

Primary Category: S.K.H. St. Michael's Primary School (8), W F Joseph Lee Primary School (4), Pui Ching Primary School (2), Lok Wah Catholic Primary School (2), Ng Wah Catholic Primary School (1), Ho Lap Primary School (Sponsored by Sik Sik Yuen) (1)

== World Youth Scrabble Championship Hong Kong Qualifier ==
Hong Kong sent its first-ever Hong Kong Youth Scrabble Team to the World Youth Scrabble Championship 2015 in Perth, Australia. A qualifier is held every year to select the Hong Kong Team members.

== Invitational Scrabble Competitions ==
Historically, several schools in Hong Kong with active Scrabble communities have organized annual invitational tournaments. The first notable competition was established in 2005 by Shun Tak Fraternal Association Leung Kau Kui College. Other prominent events included the St. Michael's Invitational Scrabble Championship, the Ho Lap College Invitational Scrabble Championship, and the CCC Mong Man Wai College Inter-School Scrabble Tournament. These tournaments traditionally operated on an individual-player basis.

In addition to general invitationals, some schools established district-based competitions:

- HKMA K S Lo College began organizing the K S Lo Inter-school Scrabble Championship for primary schools in Tin Shui Wai (later Yuen Long) in 2012.
- SKH Tsang Shiu Tim Secondary School launched the Shatin Inter-school Scrabble Competition for schools in the Shatin District in 2014.

While all schools suspended these invitational competitions during the COVID-19 pandemic, the circuit has seen a limited recovery. HKMA K S Lo College resumed its annual championship for primary schools in Yuen Long in 2022, and SKH Tsang Shiu Tim Secondary School resumed its Shatin district competition in 2023. Although CCC Mong Man Wai College held an invitational tournament in 2024, the competitions hosted by K S Lo College and Tsang Shiu Tim Secondary School are currently the only active school-organized invitational Scrabble tournaments in Hong Kong.
