= YY Lam =

Hong Kong tutor (born 1987)

- 林溢欣
- Born: Jayden Lam Yat Yan; September 23, 1987 (age 38); British Hong Kong
- Education: The Chinese University of Hong Kong (MPhil)
- Alma mater: Ho Fung College; The Chinese University of Hong Kong
- Occupation: Tutorial teacher
- Years active: 2011-
- Employer(s): Defining Education; The Chinese University of Hong Kong
- Known for: Chinese language private tutor
- Website: https://www.yylam.com.hk/

Jayden Lam Yat Yan (Chinese: 林溢欣; born September 23, 1987), known professionally as YY Lam, is a Hong Kong private tutor. A graduate of the Department of Chinese Language and Literature of The Chinese University of Hong Kong and having a Master of Philosophy degree in Chinese Language and Literature, he is prominent as a tutor of the Chinese language. He entered the field of private tutoring from the large-scale cram school Beacon College in 2011, which he continued teaching in until August 2021.

Lam currently teaches the curriculum of the Chinese language of the Hong Kong Diploma of Secondary Education at Defining Education, a cram school founded with Legendary Group Limited (later known as Legendary Education Group Limited) in December 2021, of which he owns 20% of the school’s shares, and in The Chinese University of Hong Kong on a part-time basis.

== Background ==
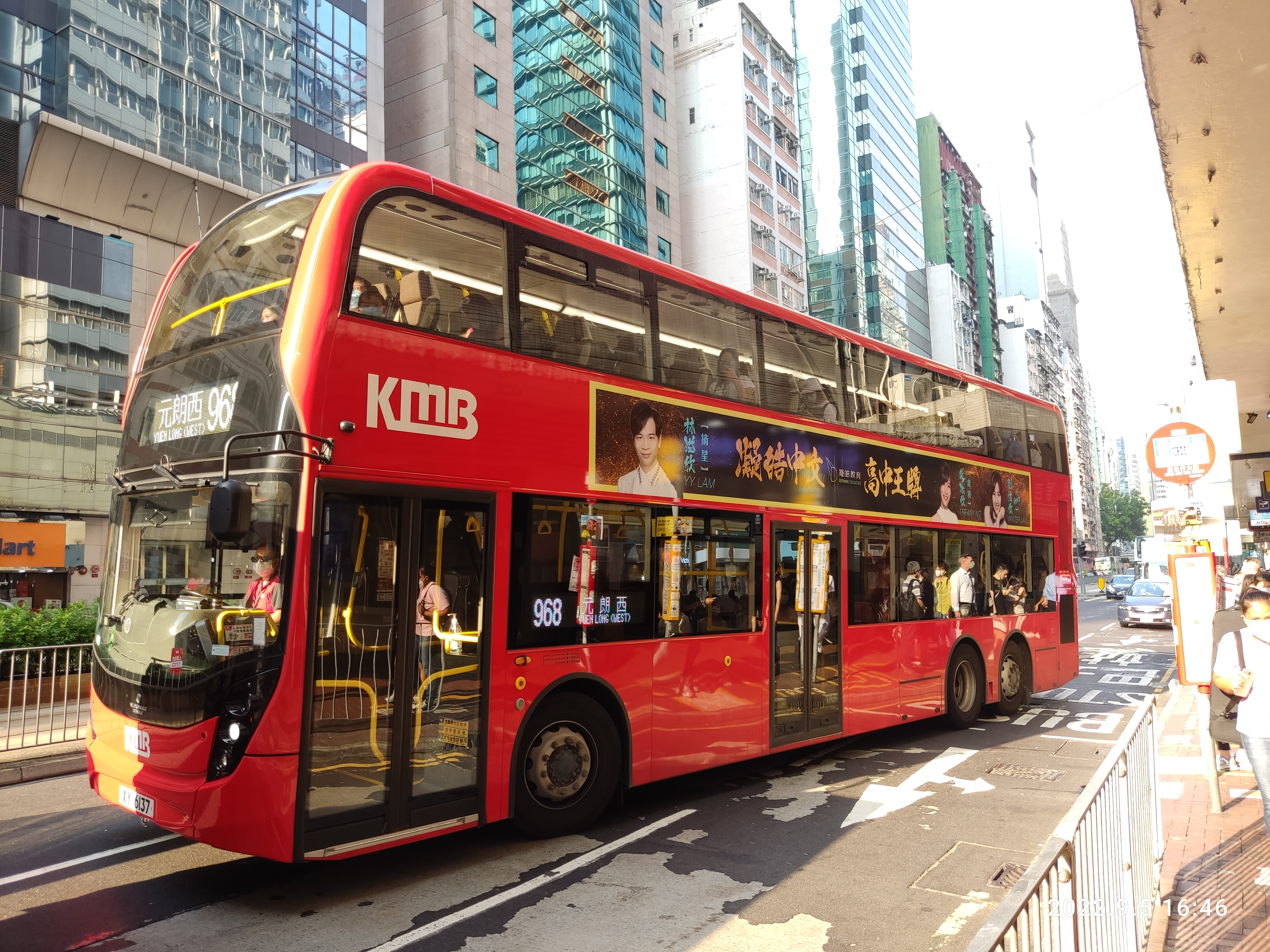
Bus advertisement featuring Lam and his cram school Defining Education

Lam studied in Free Methodist Mei Lam Primary School for primary education and Ho Fung College for his secondary school education. He received 3 level A grades in the Hong Kong Advanced Level Examinations in 2006, the highest grades obtainable in the examination, and was admitted into the Department of Chinese Language and Literature of The Chinese University of Hong Kong. He graduated in 2009 with first-class honors and subsequently obtained his Master of Philosophy degree in Chinese Language and Literature with distinction in 2011.

Lam began his career as a private tutor in the cram school Beacon College shortly after the completion of his master's degree, which he was recruited due to a sudden death of another Chinese teacher from the school. Over the years Lam was widely reported having received an annual salary of over millions of Hong Kong dollars during his time with Beacon College.

In October 2015, a competitor of Beacon College, Modern Education, released a public letter in the form of an advertisement recruiting Lam to instead be a tutor for their school, with substantial pay raise and benefits. Lam declined the offer instead, saying that "an extra HK$50 million, HK$80 million makes no difference" to him.

== Speeding incident ==
On 28 December 2015, he was suspected of driving a private car at 136 km/h on Prince Edward Road West, where the speed limit is 50 km/h—more than double the speed limit. Lam initially pleaded not guilty to his charge, but later pleaded guilty through his representative attorney without his appearance in court, with the explanation that he was in a hurry to return home and take his mother to St. Teresa's Hospital for treatment on the day of the incident, which he also stated that Lam was not posing a threat to the others. Lam was eventually fined HK$2,600 by the Kowloon City Magistrates' Courts, with his driving license suspended for one year and required to attend a driving improvement course prior to reinstatement.

== Establishment of Defining Education ==
In December 2021, Lam alongside Legendary Group Limited founded a new cram school under the name Defining Education.
