= Sun Wai-Keung =

Hong Kong actor (b1971)

Sun Wai-Keung 辛偉強 / 申偉強
- Born: 10 April 1971 (age 55); Hong Kong
- Other names: Sun Wai-Keung; San Wai-Keung; Christopher Sun
- Education: Postgraduate Diploma in Acting; School of Drama; The Hong Kong Academy for Performing Arts; Ho Lap College; Po Yan Primary School
- Occupations: Actor; acting instructor
- Years active: 1994–present
- Notable work: Whose Life Is It Anyway?《生殺之權》 Art《藝術》 Shed Skin Papa《脫皮爸爸》 Footprints in the Snow《一頁飛鴻》
- Spouse(s): Poon Pik-Wan, Priscilla (Married 2008)
- Awards: Hong Kong Drama Awards： > 2003 Best Supporting Actor (Tragedy/Drama)—A Dream Like a Dream《如夢之夢》 > 2006 Best Actor (Tragedy/Drama)—Whose Life Is It Anyway?《生殺之權》 > 2008 Best Actor (Comedy/Farce)—Art《藝術》 > 2012 Best Actor (Comedy/Farce)—Shed Skin Papa《脫皮爸爸》 The Chinese Drama Festival: > 2016 Outstanding Performance Award—Footprints in the Snow《一頁飛鴻》

Sun Wai-Keung (Chinese: 辛偉強, stage name: 申偉強) (born April 10, 1971) is a Hong Kong actor. Sun began his professional acting career in 1994 and has since performed over a hundred-stage roles., nominated 19 times for the Hong Kong Drama Awards (香港舞台劇獎) and other theatre awards, and has won five times. In recent years, he has expanded into screen acting, appearing in Hong Kong ViuTV's original program Be An Acting Star (《選角》) as an Acting Instructor and starring in the television series City of Light (《光明大押》). He also organizes theatre productions and drama reading performances overseas, nurturing young talents in the performing arts.

== Background ==
=== Early life ===
Born and raised in Hong Kong, Sun attended Po Yan Primary School (1977–1983), then Ho Lap College starting in 1983. The secondary school hosted an annual "Drama Night," where he was bored by the poor acting he witnessed as audience. Determined to make a difference, he joined the school drama club in Form 3. His acting talent was soon recognized by Mr. Raymond To Kwok-Wai (杜國威), the teacher in charge of drama, who became his formative mentor and enlightener. During his secondary school years, Sun won the "Best Actor Award" in consecutive school drama competitions (1986/87 and 1987/88). Upon graduating, Sun gave up otherwise attractive School of Design at the then Hong Kong Polytechnic, and chose to pursue his passion for the stage by enrolling in the School of Drama at the Hong Kong Academy for Performing Arts, thereupon embarked on a lifelong profession.

=== Acting career ===
During his studies at the Hong Kong Academy for Performing Arts, Sun received three performance awards and three scholarships. He was honored with the "Most Promising Actor Award" (1990/91) and the "Outstanding Actor Award" twice (1992/93 and 1993/94). His academic excellence earned him the Artiste Training Alumni Association Scholarship (1990/91), the Jackie Chan Charitable Foundation Scholarship (1992/93), and the Standard Chartered Bank Scholarship (1993/94).

In 1994, he graduated from the Hong Kong Academy for Performing Arts with a Postgraduate Diploma in Acting and joined the Hong Kong Repertory Theatre the same year as a full-time actor. Guided by theatre legends Mr. Chung King-Fai (鍾景輝) and Mr. Fredric Mao Chun-Fai (毛俊輝), Sun committed himself fully to the craft—even performing through injuries in his pursuit of excellence. In 1999, he landed his first lead role as young Peer in Norwegian play writer Henrik Ibsen's famous work Peer Gynt, translated as 《培爾•金特》, marking his rise as one of the troupe's key actors.

After three decades with the Hong Kong Repertory Theatre, Sun left to become a freelance actor in 2024. Over the years, he has received 19 theatre nominations and five awards from the Hong Kong Drama Awards (香港舞台劇獎) and the Chinese Drama Festivals (華文戲劇節), participated in the cross-strait joint performances in China, Taiwan, Hong Kong and Macau, and other performances abroad. Sun's stage repertoire in over a hundred productions spans a wide range of characters — classical and modern, virtuous and villainous, tenacious and cowardly, comedic and tragic. He is known for infusing characters with rich nuance through his use of dialogue and stagecraft and for reinterpreting ordinary characters with emotional depth. His ability to master even the most extreme personalities or emotional shifts in a single take earned praise from Golden Horse Best Actor Mr. Tse Kwan-Ho, who described him as "a veritable stage drama king."

In addition to acting, Sun also works in voice dubbing, directing, screenwriting, story development, and drama instruction.

=== Teaching and Mentorship ===
Alongside his acting career, Sun is deeply committed to theatre education. He has led workshops and training sessions for aspiring actors in both Hong Kong and the United Kingdom.

=== Personal life ===
Sun met his wife, Ms. Poon Pik-Wan (潘璧雲) through their shared work in the performing arts. Poon is a dramatist, writer, and certified sound bowl therapist. They married in 2008, with Sun adding a personal touch to the wedding by creating original comics and love songs. Since then, they have pursued their artistic and cultural journeys hand-in-hand.

The couple advocate for animal rights and oppose pet trafficking. They have taken part in numerous rescue missions, saving abandoned and endangered cats and dogs—at one point raising ten cats and ten dogs simultaneously at home, all from the wild. In recent years, they have adopted a vegetarian lifestyle in pursuit of health and longevity.

=== Recent developments ===
In 2020, Sun adopted a stage name in Chinese (申偉強) as he embarked on a new phase in career. In 2024, he and his wife organized theatre works and drama reading performances in a UK tour across 3 cities, handholding fledgling actors. Back in Hong Kong, he made his television debut in ViuTV's original program Be An Acting Star (《選角》) as acting instructor, and continued into 2025 with the historical TV series City of Light (《光明大押》).

In September 2025, Sun returned to the stage in Manchester, performing in a new original play written by his wife with both as joint directors, as part of the Hong Kong Stories • UK Stages 2025 theatre series.The same play was first performed as a reading in Kingston, England in November 2025.

== Performances ==
=== Stage plays ===
Sun's stage repertoire in over a hundred productions spans a wide range of genres and characters.

Year	Title	Role	Venue
1994	The Seven Wisemen of the Bamboo Grove《竹林七賢》	Cheng-ji (成濟)	Hong Kong Sai Wan Ho Civic Centre Theatre
1994	Tales of the Walled City《城寨風情》	Kam Tai-Keung (金大強) (Main character)	Hong Kong Cultural Centre Grand Theatre
1994	Black Elk Speaks《黑鹿開口了》	Whirlwind Chaser (風哨) (Main character)	Hong Kong Cultural Centre Theatre
1995	The Mad Phoenix《南海十三郎》(Rerun)	Five Storytellers (講古五人組) (Main character)	Hong Kong Sai Wan Ho Civic Centre Theatre, Hong Kong Sha Tin Town Hall Auditorium
1995	Three Sisters《三姊妹》	Military Officer (軍官)	Hong Kong City Hall Theatre
1995	One Man, Two Guvnors《一僕二主》	The Masses (群眾)	Hong Kong Sheung Wan Civic Centre Theatre
1995	An Evening of Absurdism and Post-modernism - Hamletmachine / The Bald Soprano 荒謬及後現代之夜-《哈姆雷特機器 / 禿頭女高音》	Hamlet (哈姆雷特) (Main character)	Hong Kong Sai Wan Ho Civic Centre Theatre
1995	Red Room, White Room, Black Room《紅房間、白房間、黑房間》	Shen Da-Mao (申大毛) (Main character)	Hong Kong City Hall Theatre
1996	Tales of the Walled City《城寨風情》(Rerun)	Kam Tai-Keung (金大強) (Main character)	Hong Kong Cultural Centre Grand Theatre
1996	Love à la Zen《愛情觀自在》	Believers (信衆)	Hong Kong Cultural Centre Theatre
1996	The School for Scandal《造謠學堂》	Trip, Charles Surface's Servant (勾你仆)	Hong Kong Cultural Centre Theatre
1996	Miss To Sup-Neung《miss杜十娘》	Liu Yu-Chun (柳遇春)	Hong Kong City Hall Theatre
1997	A Midsummer Night's Dream《仲夏夜之夢》	Fairy (精靈)	Hong Kong Cultural Centre Grand Theatre
1997	Villa Parasol《梧桐別墅》	Ng Yau-Gun (吳有根)	Hong Kong City Hall Theatre
1997	1941《一九四一》	Japanese Officer (日本軍官)	Hong Kong Cultural Centre Theatre
1997	Tales of the Walled City《城寨風情》(3rd performance)	Kam Tai-Keung (金大強) (Main character)	Hong Kong Cultural Centre Grand Theatre
1997	Spring and Autumn Soul《春秋魂》	The Masses (群眾)	Hong Kong Sai Wan Ho Civic Centre Theatre
1997	《誰遣香茶挽夢回》	Renovation chap (裝修仔)	Hong Kong Cultural Centre Grand Theatre
1998	《瘋雨狂居》	John (Main character)	Hong Kong Cultural Centre Theatre
1998	《北京大爺》	De Wen-Man (德文滿) (Main character)	Hong Kong City Hall Theatre
1998	Love à la Zen《愛情觀自在》(Rerun)	Believers (信衆)	Hong Kong Cultural Centre Theatre
1998	Le Malade Imaginaire《戇病夫妙計試真情》	Cléante (奇列池) (Main character)	Hong Kong Sai Wan Ho Civic Centre Theatre
1998	Red Sky《紅色的天空》	Son (兒子)	Hong Kong Sai Wan Ho Civic Centre Theatre
1998	De Ling and Empress Dowager Ci Xi《德齡與慈禧》	Fu-Xiang (福祥)	Hong Kong Cultural Centre Theatre
1999	Forever and Ever《地久天長》	Siu-Fu's friend (小富的朋友)	Hong Kong City Hall Theatre
1999	Peer Gynt《培爾•金特》	Young Peer (少年培爾) (Male lead actor)	Hong Kong Cultural Centre Grand Theatre
1999	Whose Wife Is It Anyway?《誰家老婆上錯床》	Lo Lai (魯禮)	Hong Kong Cultural Centre Theatre
1999	Small Ripples in a Dead Pool《死水微瀾》	The Masses (群眾)	Hong Kong City Hall Theatre
1999	《開市大吉》	Son (兒子)	Hong Kong Cultural Centre Theatre
1999-2000	Ricky My Love《歴奇》	The Trio (三人組) (Main character)	Hong Kong Cultural Centre Grand Theatre
2000	《尋人的眼睛》	Son (子)	Hong Kong City Hall Theatre
2000	Let Me Love Once《讓我愛一次》	Ken	Hong Kong Cultural Centre Theatre
2000	A Midsummer Night's Dream《仲夏夜之夢》(Rerun)	Fairy (精靈)	Hong Kong Cultural Centre Grand Theatre
2000	《黃金谷》	The Masses (群眾)	HKRep Black Box, Hong Kong Sheung Wan Civic Centre
2000	An Absolute Turkey《一拍兩散偷錯情》	Rédillon (偷情男) (Main character)	葵青劇院演奏廳
2001	De Ling and Empress Dowager Ci Xi《德齡與慈禧》(Rerun)	Fu-Xiang (福祥)	Hong Kong Cultural Centre Theatre
2001	We are One Family《明月何曾是兩鄉》	Ramen shop apprentice (拉麵店徒弟)	Hong Kong City Hall Theatre
2001	The Crucible《靈慾劫》	John Proctor (莊•普特) (Male lead actor)	Hong Kong City Hall Theatre
2001	Forever and Ever《地久天長》(Rerun)	Lam Bo Fai, the despicable guy (林寶輝 卑鄙佬)	Hong Kong Cultural Centre Theatre
2001	Hong Kong for Sure!《香港一定得！》	The Masses (群眾)	葵青劇院演奏廳
2001	Uncle Vanya《凡尼亞舅舅》	Ilya Ilich Telegin (泰列金)	Hong Kong City Hall Theatre
2002	Secret of Resurrection《還魂香》	Lai Shao-Qiu (賴少秋)	Hong Kong Cultural Centre Grand Theatre
2002	A Matter of 4x6《戀戀4x6》	The Masses (群眾)	HKRep Black Box, Hong Kong Sheung Wan Civic Centre
2002	A Dream Like a Dream《如夢之夢》	Young Wang De-Bao (年輕王德寶) (Main character)	Hong Kong Cultural Centre Theatre
2002	Let Me Love Once《讓我愛一次》(Rerun)	Ken	Hong Kong Sai Wan Ho Civic Centre Theatre
2002	Love in a Fallen City《新傾城之戀》	Fan Liu-Yuen's subordinate (范柳原手下)	Hong Kong Cultural Centre Grand Theatre
2003	Rape Virus《Rape 病毒》	Juvenile (少年)	Hong Kong Arts Centre Shouson Theatre
2003	Formula of the Thunderstorm《雷雨謊情》	Playwright (劇作家) (Male lead actor)	Hong Kong Kwai Tsing Theatre Auditorium
2003	Eccentricities of a Nightingale《請你愛我一小時》	John (約翰) (Male lead actor)	Hong Kong Arts Centre Shouson Theatre
2003	Haunted Haunted Little Star《長髮幽靈》	Film set uncle (片埸大叔)	Hong Kong Sai Wan Ho Civic Centre Theatre
2003	Departure 00:00《時間列車 0:00》	S (Main character)	Hong Kong City Hall Theatre
2003	Sweet & Sour Hong Kong《酸酸甜甜香港地》	Ramen shop apprentice (拉麵店徒弟)	Hong Kong Cultural Centre Grand Theatre
2004	A Small Family Business《家庭作孽》(Entry for the 32nd Hong Kong Arts Festival)	Younger brother (弟弟)	Hong Kong Cultural Centre Theatre
2004	Peach Blossom Fan《梅花扇》	Yang Long-You (楊龍友)	Hong Kong City Hall Theatre
2004	The Importance of Being Earnest《不可兒戲》(Theatrical Gem Revival)	Algernon Moncrieff (Male lead actor)	The Drama Theatre of The Hong Kong Academy for Performing Arts
2004	Sweet & Sour Hong Kong《酸酸甜甜香港地》(Rerun)	Ramen shop apprentice (拉麵店徒弟)	Lyric Theatre, The Hong Kong Academy for Performing Arts
2004	Rotate 270°《旋轉270°》(Entry for the 2nd New Vision Arts Festival)	The Masses (群眾)	Hong Kong Cultural Centre Theatre
2005	Whose Life Is It Anyway?《生殺之權》(Theatrical Gem Revival)	Ken Harrison (夏禮信) (Male lead actor)	Hong Kong City Hall Theatre
2005	Vassa Zheleznova《鐵娘子》(Entry for the 33rd Hong Kong Arts Festival)	Servant (僕人)	Hong Kong Kwai Tsing Theatre Auditorium
2005	Zheng He and The Emperor《鄭和與成組》	Zheng He (鄭和) (Male lead actor)	Hong Kong Kwai Tsing Theatre Auditorium
2005	February 14 - A musical 音樂劇《2月14》(Rerun)	Boyfriend (男朋友)	HKRep Black Box, Hong Kong Sheung Wan Civic Centre
2005	Love in a Fallen City《新傾城之戀2005》	Fan Liu-Yuan's subordinate (范柳原手下)	Lyric Theatre, The Hong Kong Academy for Performing Arts
2005	The Boxer《拳手》	Coach (教練)	HKRep Black Box, Hong Kong Sheung Wan Civic Centre
2006	Peter Pan《小飛俠之幻影迷踪》	The Masses (群眾)	Hong Kong Cultural Centre Grand Theatre
2006	Love in a Fallen City《新傾城之戀》(2006 a passionate reunion)	Fan Liu-Yuan's subordinate (范柳原手下)	Lyric Theatre, The Hong Kong Academy for Performing Arts
2006	Haunted Haunted Little Star《長髮幽靈》(Reversed Version)	Film set uncle (片場大叔)	Hong Kong Arts Centre Shouson Theatre
2006	Blindness《盲流感》	The first blind man (第一個盲人) (Main character)	Hong Kong Kwai Tsing Theatre Auditorium
2006	De Ling and Empress Dowager Ci Xi《德齡與慈禧》(Remake)	The Masses (群眾)	Hong Kong Cultural Centre Grand Theatre
2007	Dust and Dawn《我自在江湖》	Japanese Warrior (東瀛武者)	Hong Kong City Hall Theatre
2007	Art《藝術》	Yvan (易邦) (Male lead actor)	Hong Kong Arts Centre Shouson Theatre
2007	From Sunset to Sunrise《萬家之寶》	The Masses (群眾)	Hong Kong Cultural Centre Theatre
2007	Secret Love in Peach Blossom Land《暗戀桃花源》(Hong Kong version)	Lao Tao (老陶) (Main character)	Hong Kong Cultural Centre Grand Theatre
2007	Secret of Resurrection《梨花夢》	Lai Shao-Qiu (賴少秋)	Lyric Theatre, The Hong Kong Academy for Performing Arts
2008	Love You Forever《我愛阿愛》	Ng Lap-Tak (吳立德) (Main character)	Hong Kong City Hall Theatre
2008	Family Protection Unit《家庭保衛隊》	Washing Machine (洗衣機阿攪)	Hong Kong Arts Centre Shouson Theatre
2008	Art《藝術》(Rerun)	Yvan (易邦) (Male lead actor)	Hong Kong City Hall Theatre
2008	De Ling and Empress Dowager Ci Xi《德齡與慈禧》(Putonghua Version)	The Masses (群眾)	Hong Kong Cultural Centre Grand Theatre
2008	Field of Dreams《頂頭鎚》	Ah Kin (阿健) (Main character)	Hong Kong Kwai Tsing Theatre Auditorium
2008	Journey with Mr Aw《虎豹別野》	Younger brother (弟弟) (Main character)	HKRep Black Box, Hong Kong Sheung Wan Civic Centre
2009	Caligula《捕月魔君．卡里古拉》	Caligula (卡里古拉) (Male lead actor)	Hong Kong City Hall Theatre
2009	Beautiful Connection《美麗連繫》	Prince (王子)	Hong Kong Cultural Centre Theatre
2009	A Flea in Her Ear《橫衝直撞偷錯情》	Victor-Emmanuel Chandebise (查先生) (Male lead actor)	Hong Kong City Hall Theatre
2009	Richard III《李察三世》	The Masses (群眾)	Hong Kong Cultural Centre Grand Theatre
2009	Boundless Movement《遍地芳菲》	Yu Pei-Lun (喻培倫)	Hong Kong Kwai Tsing Theatre Auditorium
2009	Bun in the Cave《敦煌．流沙．包》	Gau-zai (九仔) (Main character)	Hong Kong City Hall Theatre
2009-2010	Scrooge (musical)《奇幻聖誕夜》(English version), (Cantonese version)	Tom (阿湯)	Hong Kong City Hall Theatre
2010	Communicating Doors《2029追殺1989》	Kam Lai-Leung (甘禮良)	Hong Kong Arts Centre Shouson Theatre
2010	A Flea in Her Ear《橫衝直撞偷錯情》(Rerun)	Victor-Emmanuel Chandebise (查先生) (Male lead actor)	Hong Kong City Hall Theatre
2010	Dr. Faustus《魔鬼契約》	Angel (天使)	Hong Kong Cultural Centre Grand Theatre
2010	Dr. Tim Ding's Factory《全城熱爆搞大佢》	Dr. Ding (丁醫生) (Main character)	HKRep Black Box, Hong Kong Sheung Wan Civic Centre
2010	Love You Forever《我愛阿愛》(Rerun)	Ng Lap-Tak (吳立德) (Main character)	Hong Kong City Hall Theatre
2011	The Empress of China《中國皇后號》	The Masses (群眾)	Hong Kong City Hall Theatre
2011	Death and the Maiden《不道德的審判》	Gerardo (Male lead actor)	Hong Kong Arts Centre Shouson Theatre
2011	Boundless Movement《遍地芳菲》(Rerun)	Yu Pei-Lun (喻培倫)	Hong Kong Cultural Centre Grand Theatre
2011	Reverie on an Empire《一年皇帝夢》	Yuan Shi-Kai (袁世凱) (Male lead actor)	Hong Kong City Hall Theatre
2011	Shed Skin Papa《脫皮爸爸》	Suzuki Takuya (鈴木卓也) (Male lead actor)	Hong Kong Arts Centre Shouson Theatre
2011	Scrooge (musical)《奇幻聖誕夜》(Rerun)	Tom (阿湯)	Hong Kong City Hall Theatre
2012	Desert the Dangling Cat《半天吊的流浪貓》	Actor (演員) (Male lead actor)	HKRep Black Box, Hong Kong Sheung Wan Civic Centre
2012	A Bowlful of Kindness《有飯自然香》	Dog Head (狗頭)	Hong Kong City Hall Theatre
2012	I Have a Date with Autumn《我和秋天有個約會》	Manager (經理人)	Lyric Theatre, The Hong Kong Academy for Performing Arts
2012	Noise Off House Programme《蝦碌戲班》	Lloyd Dallas (戴志成) (Male lead actor)	Hong Kong City Hall Theatre
2013	Field of Dreams《頂頭鎚》(Rerun)	Lee Wai-Tong (李惠堂) (Main character)	Hong Kong Cultural Centre Grand Theatre
2013	The Emperor, His Mom, a Eunuch and a Man《都是龍袍惹的禍》	Servant (僕人)	Hong Kong Arts Centre Shouson Theatre
2013	The Cherry Orchard《櫻桃園》	Lopakhin (樂百軒) (Main character)	Hong Kong City Hall Theatre
2013	Eighteenth Floor Block C《十八樓C座》	The Masses (群眾)	Hong Kong City Hall Theatre, Jockey Club Auditorium, Hong Kong PolyU Campus
2013	A Bowlful of Kindness《有飯自然香》(Rerun)	Dog Head (狗頭)	Hong Kong City Hall Theatre
2014	The Soongs: By Dreams Betrayed《如此長江》	Chiang Kai-Shek (蔣介石) (Main character)	Hong Kong Cultural Centre Grand Theatre
2014	Shed Skin Papa《脫皮爸爸》(Rerun)	Suzuki Takuya (鈴木卓也) (Male lead actor)	Hong Kong Arts Centre Shouson Theatre
2014	Attempts on Her Life《安・非她命》	The Masses (群眾)	Hong Kong City Hall Theatre
2014	The Emperor, His Mom, a Eunuch and a Man《都是龍袍惹的禍》(Rerun)	Servant (僕人)	Hong Kong City Hall Theatre
2014	The Common Cold《感冒誌》	Man (男人) (Male lead actor)	Hong Kong City Hall Theatre
2015	Hello, Dolly! The musical《俏紅娘》	The Masses (群眾)	Hong Kong Cultural Centre Grand Theatre
2015	The Imaginary Invalid《蠢病還須蠱惑醫》	Bonnefoy (包利飛)	Hong Kong City Hall Theatre
2015	The Emperor, His Mom, a Eunuch and a Man《都是龍袍惹的禍》(Rerun)	Servant (僕人)	Hong Kong Ko Shan Theatre
2015	Circle Mirror Transformation《緣移戲劇班》	Schultz (Main character)	Hong Kong City Hall Theatre
2016	Hong Kong Plague - a Musical《太平山之疫]	The Masses (群眾)	Hong Kong Cultural Centre Grand Theatre
2016	Footprints in the Snow《一頁飛鴻》	Sheung Ying-Fai (常映輝) (Male lead actor)	Hong Kong City Hall Theatre
2016	Whose Wife is it Anyway?《誰家老婆上床》	Yeung Sai-Chau (楊世洲委員) (Male lead actor)	Hong Kong City Hall Theatre
2016	Hu XueYan, My Dear《親愛的・胡雪巖》	Lai Lao-Si (賴老四) (Main character)	Hong Kong City Hall Theatre
2017	Field of Dreams《頂頭鎚2017LIVE+》	Lee Wai-Tong (李惠堂) (Main character)	Hong Kong Cultural Centre Grand Theatre
2017	The Homecoming《回歸》	Sam	Hong Kong Arts Centre Shouson Theatre
2017	Forever Silence《塵上不囂》	Priest (牧師)	Hong Kong City Hall Theatre
2017	Buried Child《埋藏的秘密》	Bradley	Hong Kong City Hall Theatre
2017	Reincarnation of the Prunus Mume《紅梅再世》	Lo's Father (盧父)	Hong Kong Cultural Centre Grand Theatre
2017	Le Père《父親》	Man (男人)	Hong Kong Arts Centre Shouson Theatre
2017-2018	Scrooge (musical)《奇幻聖誕夜》(Rerun)	Tom (阿湯)	Lyric Theatre, The Hong Kong Academy for Performing Arts
2018	Die Firma dankt《公司感謝您》	Krusenstern (Male lead actor)	Hong Kong City Hall Theatre
2018	Principle《原則》(2018新版)	Discipline Master Choi Lam (訓導主任蔡霖) (Main character)	Hong Kong City Hall Theatre
2018-2019	The Glass Menagerie《玻璃動物園》	Jim O'Connor (Main character)	Hong Kong Sunbeam Theatre
2019	Marriage《結婚》(Rerun)	Nakahara Taisuke (中原太助)	Hong Kong Yuen Long Theatre Auditorium
2019	Le Père《父親》(Rerun)	Man (男人)	Hong Kong City Hall Theatre
2019	A Dream Like a Dream《如夢之夢》	Patient No. 5 (五號病人) (Male lead actor)	The Box, Freespace, Hong Kong West Kowloon Cultural District
2020	Speaking in Tongues《叛侶》	Husband (丈夫) (Male lead actor)	Hong Kong City Hall Theatre
From here on, Sun performs under the stage name 申偉強：
2020	Principle《原則》(Rerun) (Hong Kong Repertory Theatre's first online live broadcast and on-demand broadcast)	Discipline Master Choi Lam (訓導主任蔡霖) (Main character)	Hong Kong City Hall Theatre
2021	Le Père《父親》(Rerun)	Man (男人)	Hong Kong City Hall Theatre
2021	The Finale of Mr. AD《美麗團員大結局》	Ma Sai-Tat (馬世達)	Hong Kong City Hall Theatre
2021	To Damascus《往大馬士革之路》	The Stranger (陌生男) (Male lead actor)	Hong Kong City Hall Theatre
2022	Love à la Zen《愛情觀自在》	Mei Na's Father (娜父)	Hong Kong City Hall Theatre
2022	Confrontations《兩刃相交》	Youngest daughter Pang Kiu-Nuen (幼女彭嬌嫩)	The Box, Freespace, Hong Kong West Kowloon Cultural District
2022	The Top Restaurant《天下第一樓》	Wang Zi-Xi (王子西) (Main character)	Hong Kong Cultural Centre Grand Theatre
2023	All Good Things《不散的筵席》	Chef Kwok (大廚郭金/希治廓)	Hong Kong Arts Centre Shouson Theatre
2023	Scapin in Jiānghú, Chapter 2023《史家本第二零二三回之伏虎降龍》	Greater Tiger (虎千山) (Main character)	Hong Kong City Hall Theatre
2023	HKREP On Screen: Principle《原則》 (From the theatre to the cinema)	Discipline Master Choi Lam (訓導主任蔡霖) (Main character)	MCL K11 Art House
2023	Moscow Express《從金鐘到莫斯科》	The Masses (群眾)	Hong Kong City Hall Theatre
2024	The Doctor《醫・道》	Roger Hardiman (Main character)	Hong Kong Arts Centre Shouson Theatre
2025	The Top Restaurant《天下第一樓》	Wang Zi-Xi (王子西) (Main character)	Hong Kong Cultural Centre Grand Theatre

=== Community performance ===
Year	Title	Venue
2010	"Cultural District 2010-2011 Series" — "Love from East and West" New Drama Experience — Heartwarming Comedy Love You Forever《我愛阿愛》	Hong Kong City Hall Theatre

=== Performances abroad ===
Sun's stages beyond Hong Kong include cross-strait joint performances in China, Taiwan, Hong Kong and Macau, other Asia locations and most recently the UK.

Year	Title	Role	Venue
2000	A Midsummer Night's Dream《仲夏夜之夢》(Rerun)	Fairy (精靈)	Taipei National Theatre
2002	Let Me Love Once《讓我愛一次》(Rerun)	Ken	Macao Cultural Centre Small Theatre, Guangzhou Friendship Theatre
2002	Love in a Fallen City《新傾城之戀》	Fan Liu-Yuan's subordinate (范柳原手下)	Macao Cultural Centre Grand Auditorium
2003	Haunted Haunted Little Star《長髮幽靈》	Film set uncle (片埸大叔)	Macao Cultural Centre Small Theatre
2004	Sweet & Sour Hong Kong《酸酸甜甜香港地》(Rerun)	Ramen shop apprentice (拉麵店徒弟)	Hangzhou Xiaoshan Theatre, Shanghai Tianchan Yifu Theatre
2005	Love in a Fallen City《新傾城之戀2005》	Fan Liu-Yuan's subordinate (范柳原手下)	Shanghai Dramatic Arts Centre - Art Theatre
2007	Secret Love in Peach Blossom Land《暗戀桃花源》(Three-region Joint Performance Version)	Lao Tao (老陶) (Main character)	Beijing Capital Theater
2008	Art《藝術》	Yvan (易邦) (Male lead actor)	Macao Cultural Centre Small Theatre
2008	De Ling and Empress Dowager Ci Xi《德齡與慈禧》(Putonghua Version)	The Masses (群眾)	Beijing National Centre for the Performing Arts Drama Theatre
2010	A Flea in Her Ear《沉默是針》	Victor-Emmanuel Chandebise (查先生) (Male lead actor)	Guangzhou Guanglian Hall
2011	Boundless Movement《遍地芳菲》	Yu Pei-Lun (喻培倫)	Guangzhou Opera House Opera Hall
2011	Shed Skin Papa《脫皮爸爸》	Suzuki Takuya (鈴木卓也) (Male lead actor)	Guangdong Song & Dance Theatre Small Theatre
2012	I Have a Date with Autumn《我和秋天有個約會》	Manager (經理人)	Taipei Performance Art Theatre
2014	Shed Skin Papa《脫皮爸爸》(Japanese premiere)	Suzuki Takuya (鈴木卓也) (Male lead actor)	Japan Nagakute Cultural Centre Wind Hall
2014	The Emperor, His Mom, a Eunuch and a Man《都是龍袍惹的禍》	Servant (僕人)	Guangzhou Performance Art Center Theatre No. 13
2015	The Emperor, His Mom, a Eunuch and a Man《都是龍袍惹的禍》	Servant (僕人)	Beijing National Centre for the Performing Arts Drama Theatre, Shanghai Grand Theatre The Buick Theatre
2016	Hu XueYan, My Dear《親愛的・胡雪巖》	Lai Lao-Si (賴老四) (Main character)	Shanghai Tianchan Yifu Theatre
2020	Principle《原則》	Discipline Master Choi Lam (訓導主任蔡霖) (Main character)	Singapore Esplanade Theatres on the Bay Theatre Studio
2024	Principle《原則》UK Tour Reader's Theatre	Vice Principal Chan Yin (副校長陳賢) (Male lead actor)	The United Kingdom: Nottingham, Kingston, Manchester
2024-2025	The Top Restaurant《天下第一樓》Shenzhen-Foshan-Suzhou-Beijing-Shanghai Tour	Wang Zi-Xi (王子西)	Bay Opera of Shenzhen, Foshan Grand Theatre, Suzhou Bay Grand Theatre, Beijing Tianqiao Performing Arts Centre, Shanghai Oriental Art Centre
2025	Luncheon Meat on the Blue Danube《多瑙河上的午餐肉》	Dumb boy (啞仔) (Male lead actor)	The Empty Space Theatre, Manchester, United Kingdom

=== Play reading performances ===
Sun plays, organizes or creates Play reading programs as another form of theatre performance.

Year	Title	Remark
2009	Reader's Theatre—Fox Volant of the Snowy Mountain《雪山飛狐》	Hong Kong City Hall High Block Recital Hall
2009	Reader's Theatre—A Flea in Her Ear《橫衝直撞偷錯情》	Hong Kong City Hall Recital Hall
2009	Reader's Theatre—Communicating Doors《2029追殺1989》	Hong Kong City Hall Recital Hall
2009	Reader's Theatre—Bun in the Cave《敦煌．流沙．包》	Hong Kong City Hall Recital Hall
2010	Reader's Theatre—Communicating Doors《2029追殺1989》(For the second times！)	Hong Kong Arts Centre Shouson Theatre
2010	Reader's Theatre—Dr. Tim Ding's Factory《全城熱爆搞大佢》	Hong Kong City Hall Recital Hall
2010	Reader's Theatre—Death and the Maiden《不道德的審判》	Hong Kong City Hall Recital Hall
2012	Reader's Theatre—Crumbled《危樓》	Hong Kong City Hall Recital Hall
2013	Reader's Theatre—The Emperor, His Mom, a Eunuch and a Man《都是龍袍惹的禍》	Hong Kong City Hall Recital Hall
2014	Doubt《最後疑問》	Hong Kong City Hall Theatre
2015	Arthur Miller Reader's Theatre—The Crucible《嚴峻的考驗》	Hong Kong Sha Tin Town Hall Exhibition Gallery
2017	African Plays Tasting Series: Over My Dead Body《拚死阻止》	Hong Kong Kwai Tsing Theatre - Black Box Theatre
2018	Reader's Theatre—Blackbird《黑鳥》	Hong Kong City Hall High Block Recital Hall
2024	Reader's Theatre—After Life《下一站，天國》	Hong Kong City Hall High Block Recital Hall
2024	UK Tour Reader's Theatre－Principle《原則》	United Kingdom: Nottingham, Kingston, Manchester
2025	Footprints in the Snow《一頁飛鴻》(2014) Broadcasting Drama Excerpt: Scene 10 F, G	Online Broadcast by International Association of Theatre Critics (Hong Kong) (IATC-HK)
2025	Reader's Theatre－Luncheon Meat on The Blue Danube《多瑙河上的午餐肉》	Kingston United Reformed Church, Kingston, United Kingdom

=== TV shows ===
Year	Program Name	Role	Organization
2024	Be An Acting Star《選角》	Acting Instructor	ViuTV

=== TV series ===
Year	Title	Role	Organization
2025	City of Light《光明大押》	Ah Lung (阿龍)	ViuTV

=== Films ===
Year	Title	Remark
1992	Stooges in Hong Kong《不文騷》	Ko Chi Sum Films Co., Ltd. Mandarin Films Distribution Co. Ltd. Director: Otto Chan Hok-Yan (陳奧圖)
1993	Two of a Kind《情人知己》	Newport Entertainment Co., Ltd. Director: Teddy Chan Tak-Sum (陳德森)
1994	Doug's Choice《阿德哂命》	Good Standard International Ltd; Media Asia Film Co. Ltd. Director: Lo Kin (盧堅)
1994	Island Fear《人善被人欺》	China Entertainment Films Production Ltd; Director: O Sing-Pui (柯星沛)

=== Commercials ===
Year	Advertisement	Organization
2017	Midland Realty 2017 Midland Realty Secret CHAT Advertisement	Midland Realty
2019	The Hong Kong Mortgage Corporation Limited Advertisement	The Hong Kong Mortgage Corporation Limited

=== Voice dubbing ===
Sun's iconic vocal performances were featured in some classic characters.

Year	Title	Character	Organization
2003	Finding Nemo 《海底奇兵》	Crush (龜龜 阿古)	Walt Disney
2005	Madagascar 《荒失失奇兵》	King Julien XIII (朱利安國王)	DreamWorks
2017	Cars Series 《反斗車王》系列	Fillmore (阿飛 (飛力))	Walt Disney
2019	The Addams Family 《愛登士家庭》	Gomez Addams (哥梅茲)	Universal Pictures
2021	The Addams Family 2 《愛登士家庭2》	Gomez Addams (哥梅茲)	Universal Pictures
2021	Encanto 《奇幻魔法屋》	Agustin Madrigal (冇古斯汀)	Walt Disney

=== Behind-the-scenes ===
In addition to acting and coaching, Sun also works in various backstage roles.

Year	Title	Remark
2002	A Matter of 4x6《戀戀4x6》	Story Creation
2003	Detective Women《女幹探》	Story Creation
2003	Haunted Haunted Little Star《長髮幽靈》	Assistant Director
2007	The Lost and Found Triology《三三不盡》	Co-writer
2008	Playwright Scheme III Prospect Theatre《劇場裏的臥虎與藏龍III》Works exhibition/presentation	Director, Co-writer, Set Design, Lighting Design, Sound Design Costume Design
2010	Dr. Faustus《魔鬼契約》	Lyrics
2012	I Have a Date with Autumn《我和秋天有個約會》	Assistant Director
2012	A Bowlful of Kindness《有飯自然香》	Assistant Director
2015	Wolf in the House《引狼入室》	Assistant Director
2017	《浮游》	Director
2018	《浮游》	Director
2018	Blackbird《黑鳥》	Director
2019	The Big Meal《盛宴》(Rerun)	Assistant Director

=== Publications ===
Year	Title	Remark
2013	HKRep Theatre Literature Studies Series Volume 12: The Art of Acting - Hong Kong Repertory Theatre's Experience《香港話劇團戲劇文學研究刊物第十二卷. 戲道．香港話劇團談表演》 ISBN 9789620756207	Co-author

=== Drama education and talks ===
Sun is deeply committed to theatre education', and will continue to lead workshops and training sessions for aspiring actors in both Hong Kong and the United Kingdom.

Year	Project Name
2008	Playwright Scheme III Prospects Theatre 《劇場裏的臥虎與藏龍III》Works exhibition/presentation
2009	Caligula《捕月魔君．卡里古拉》(Students Only)
2009	Beautiful Connection《美麗連繫》(Students Only)
2009	A Flea in Her Ear《橫衝直撞偷錯情》(Students Only)
2009	Boundless Movement《遍地芳菲》(Students Only)
2009	Bun in the Cave《敦煌．流沙．包》(Students Only)
2010	Playwright Scheme V Prospects Theatre 《劇場裏的臥虎與藏龍V》Works exhibition/presentation
2011	The Troubles of Shed Skin Papa《脫皮爸爸》— Lecture on Understanding Dementia
2011	Drama Gallery Meet on Tuesdays: The Best State of An Actor ~ Sun Wai-Keung
2012	Arts Experience Scheme for Senior Secondary Students Scrooge (musical)《奇幻聖誕夜》Pre-performance talk and Performance
2014	2013/14 Arts Experience Scheme for Senior Secondary Students The Soongs: By Dream Betrayed《如此長江》Pre-performance Talk and Performance
2014	2013/14 Arts Experience Scheme for Senior Secondary Students Shed Skin Papa《脫皮爸爸》Performance and Post-performance Discussion

=== Awards and honors ===
Over the years, Sun has received 19 theatre nominations and five awards.

Year	Award Ceremony	Award	Work	Role	Result
1998	The 7th Hong Kong Drama Awards	Best Supporting Actor (Tragedy/Drama)	《瘋雨狂居》	John	Nominated
1999	The 8th Hong Kong Drama Awards	Best Supporting Actor (Tragedy/Drama)	《北京大爺》	De Wen-Man (德文滿)	Nominated
2001	The 10th Hong Kong Drama Awards	Best Supporting Actor (Comedy/Farce)	An Absolute Turkey《一拍兩散偷錯情》	Rédillon (偷情男)	Nominated
2003	The 12th Hong Kong Drama Awards	Best Supporting Actor (Tragedy/Drama)	A Dream Like a Dream《如夢之夢》	Young Wang De-Bao (年輕王德寶)	Won
2006	The 15th Hong Kong Drama Awards	Best Actor (Tragedy/Drama)	Whose Life Is It Anyway?《生殺之權》	Ken Harrison (夏禮信)	Won
2007	The 16th Hong Kong Drama Awards	Best Actor (Comedy/Farce)	A Flea in Her Ear《橫衝直撞偷錯情》	Victor-Emmanuel Chandebise (查先生)	Nominated
2007	The 16th Hong Kong Drama Awards	Best Supporting Actor (Tragedy/Drama)	Blindness《盲流感》	The first blind man (第一個盲人)	Nominated
2008	The 17th Hong Kong Drama Awards	Best Actor (Comedy/Farce)	Art《藝術》	Yvan (易邦)	Won
2010	The 19th Hong Kong Drama Awards	Best Actor (Comedy/Farce)	A Flea in Her Ear《橫衝直撞偷錯情》	Victor-Emmanuel Chandebise (查先生)	Nominated
2012	The 21st Hong Kong Drama Awards	Best Actor (Comedy/Farce)	Shed Skin Papa《脫皮爸爸》	Suzuki Takuya (鈴木卓也)	Won
2016	The 10th Chinese Drama Festival (華文戲劇節)	Outstanding Performance Award	Footprints in the Snow《一頁飛鴻》	Sheung Ying-Fai (常映輝)	Won
2017	The 26th Hong Kong Drama Awards	Best Actor (Tragedy/Drama)	Footprints in the Snow《一頁飛鴻》	Sheung Ying-Fai (常映輝)	Nominated
2017	The 26th Hong Kong Drama Awards	Best Actor (Comedy/Farce)	Whose Wife Is It Anyway?《誰家老婆上錯床》	楊世洲委員	Nominated
2017	The 26th Hong Kong Drama Awards	Best Supporting Actor (Tragedy/Drama)	Hu XueYan, My Dear《親愛的・胡雪巖》	Lai Lao-Si (賴老四)	Nominated
2019	The 28th Hong Kong Drama Awards	Best Actor (Comedy/Farce)	Die Firma dankt《公司感謝您》	Krusenstern	Nominated
2019	The 28th Hong Kong Drama Awards	Best Supporting Actor (Tragedy/Drama)	Principle《原則》	Discipline Master Choi Lam (訓導主任蔡霖)	Nominated
2019	The 3rd Chinese Theatre Awards (華語戲劇盛典)	Best Supporting Actor	Marriage《結婚》	Nakahara Taisuke (中原太助)	Nominated
2023	Chinese Theatre Awards (華語戲劇盛典)	Best Supporting Actor	The Top Restaurant《天下第一樓》	Wang Zi-Xi (王子西)	Nominated
2025	The 33rd Hong Kong Drama Awards	Best Supporting Actor (Tragedy/Drama)	The Doctor《醫・道》	Roger Hardiman	Nominated
