= Compass College =

- Motto: Navigate Your Bright Future
- Type: Private
- Established: 2009
- President: Tony Chung
- Head: Mr. Tony Chung
- Location: 6-7/F, CIGNA Tower, 482 Jaffe Rd, Causeway Bay, Hong Kong
- Affiliations: Modern Education
- Website: compass.edu.hk

Chinese name
- Traditional Chinese: 啟示書院
Transcriptions
Yue: Cantonese
- Yale Romanization: Kái sih syū yún
- Jyutping: Kai2 si6 syu1 jun2

Compass College (Modern Continuing Education Centre) is a tertiary institution providing career oriented hospitality, tourism management and business management programs in Hong Kong. Compass College is an educational organisation affiliated with the Modern Education. It provides a one-year diploma program and two-year higher diploma program for secondary school graduates.

== Courses ==
Compass College provides one programme accredited by HKCAVVQ, cooperating with Business and Technician Education Council (BTEC) in level 3 and level 5 diploma programmes, AH&LA certificate courses, and NCC Education higher diploma programme.

One-year Diploma Programme

- Diploma in International Hospitality Management
- International Diploma in Hospitality Management
- Professional Diploma in Hospitality & Tourism Management

Two-years Diploma Programme

- Executive Diploma in Accounting & Management

Higher National Diploma BTEC Diploma Programme

- Pearson BTEC Level 3 Certificate in Hospitality
- Pearson BTEC Level 3 Certificate in Business
- Pearson BTEC Level 5 HNC Diploma in Hospitality Management
- Pearson BTEC Level 5 HNC Diploma in Business

American Hotel and Lodging Association certificate courses

- Certified Guest Service Professional

NCC Education Programme

- NCC Education Level 4 Diploma in Business (QCF)
- NCC Education Level 5 Diploma in Business (QCF)

== IELTS Registration Centre ==
Compass College is one of the registration centre of IELTS from British Council. Students can also have study aboard consultation and work abroad consultation from Compass College.
