= Ho Fung College =

Coordinates: 22.3803°N 114.1351°E

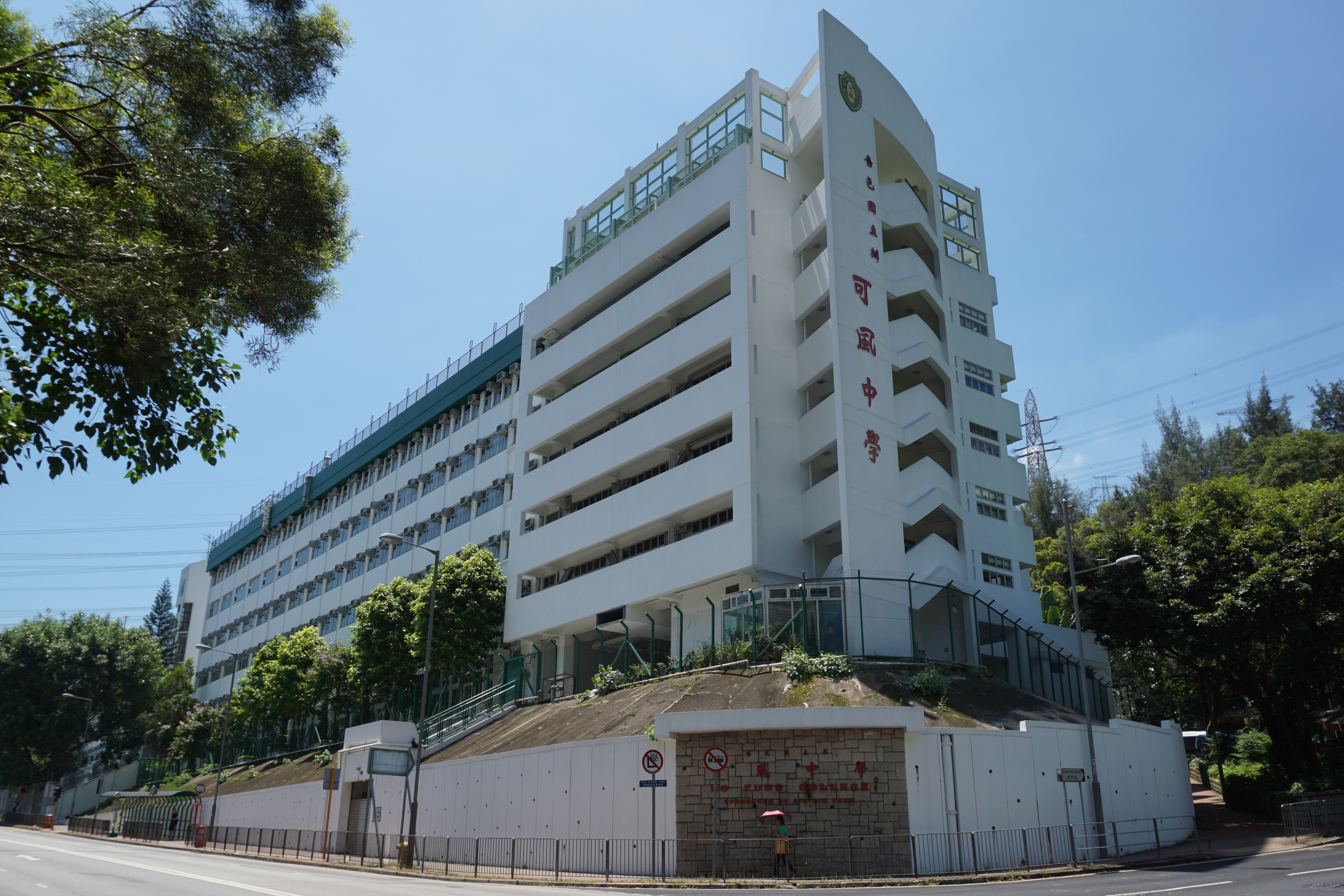
- Ho Fung College in July 2016

Location
- 448 Wo Yi Hop Road; North Kwai Chung, New Territories; Hong Kong

Information
- Type: Comprehensive, secondary.
- Established: 1974; 52 years ago
- School district: Tsuen Wan
- Principal: Mr. Tam Choi Nang Julian
- Grades: S1 to S6
- Enrollment: around 800
- Website: hofung.edu.hk

Ho Fung College (Chinese: 可風中學) is an English-instructed co-education secondary school in Hong Kong. The school is sponsored by Sik Sik Yuen. Established in 1974, the school has gained popularity with its all-around student performance across academic disciplines and sports sphere. The current principal is Mr. Tam, Choi-nang, starting his term in 2024.

== Education philosophy ==
To uphold the sponsoring body's spirit of "Pujiquanshan (Chinese: 普濟勸善)" and provide students with quality education; apart from academic achievements, the school places heavy emphasis on students' comprehensive and balanced development.

== School facilities ==
The school is situated at Lei Muk Shue, with the following campus facilities:

- 28 Classrooms
- 3 Supplementary Classrooms
- 5 Laboratories
  - 2 Integrated Science Laboratories
  - 1 Biology Laboratory
  - 1 Physics Laboratory
  - 1 Chemistry Laboratory
- 2 Computer Rooms
- Multimedia Learning Center
- Geography Room
- Music Room
- Visual Arts Room
- Design and Technology Room
- Home Economics Room
- Scouts Room
- Chinese Music Room
- Tuckshop
- Canteen
- Students' Association Room
- 2 Gymnasiums
- Student Activity Room
- School Hall
- School Office
- Principal's Office
- 2 Vice President Offices
- 4 Staff Rooms
- Teachers' Lounge
- Playground
- Library
- PTA Resource Room
- Medical Room
- Social Worker Room
- Roof Garden
- Greenhouse
- Parking Lot

== Academic curriculum ==
=== Junior forms ===
- Coordinated in Chinese: Chinese Language, Chinese History, Putonghua, Moral Education (F3)
- Coordinated in English: English Language, Mathematics, Integrated Science (F1, F2), Chemistry (F3), Physics (F3), Biology (F3), Geography, History, Life and Society, Visual Arts, Computer Science, Music, Technology and Living, Physical Education

=== Senior forms ===
- Coordinated in Chinese: Chinese Language, Liberal Studies, Chinese History, Chinese Literature, Moral Education
- Coordinated in English: English Language, Liberal Studies, Mathematics (Compulsory), Mathematics (Extended Module 1 & 2), Chemistry, Physics, Biology, Geography, History, Economics, Business, Accounting and Financial Studies, Information and Communication Technology, Physical Education
- Electives offered outside regular curriculum: Music, Visual Arts, Physical Education(cancelled) (HKDSE)

== Extra-curricular ==
More than 40 societies and teams of academics, sports, aesthetics, and community services are organised by students, with the following societies and teams:

Academic Fields	Aesthetics	Community Services
Chinese Culture Society English Society Mathematics Society Science Society Geography Society Economics Society Computer & Technology Club Health Club Chinese Debate Society English Debate Society	Visual Art Club Dance Club Modern Chinese Dance Jazz & Hip Hop Drama Club Music Club String Ensemble Recorder Ensemble Chinese Orchestra School Choir Band Society	Wind Band Girl Guide Company Scout Group St. John Cadet Division Community Youth Club Interact Club Junior Police Call Environmental Protection Unit
Interest and Hobbies	Sports	
Astronomy Club Aviation Club Chess Club Girl Base Ball Club Odyssey of the Mind Group The Hong Kong Award for Young People Shuttlecock Club	Basketball Soccer Volleyball Badminton Table tennis Handball Tennis Squash Athletics & Cross-country Run	

== Student achievements ==
=== Academic competitions ===
English Debate

- The 16th NESTA Debating competition - Champion
- Hong Kong Secondary School Debating Competition 2015 - Champion

Chinese Debate

- The 9th Basic Law Debating Competition Basic Law Cup - 2nd runner-up
- The 13th Basic Law Debating Competition Basic Law Cup - Champion

=== Non-academic competitions ===
Odyssey of the Mind

- Odyssey of the Mind 2000 World Finals - Champion
- Odyssey of the Mind 2016 World Finals - 1st Runner-up

=== Sports tournaments ===
Bank of China (Hong Kong) 56th Festival of Sport - Hong Kong Secondary School Baseball Elite Championship 2013

- Women's Junior: Champion

Samsung 59th Festival of Sport - Hong Kong Secondary School Baseball Elite Championship 2016

- Women's Junior: Champion
- Women's Senior: Champion

==== Tsuen Wan & Island Secondary Schools Area ====
2006-2007 Results

- Boys Overall: Champion
- Girls Overall: Champion

	Track & field	Badminton	Basketball	Cross-country	Football	Handball	Swimming	Table tennis	Volleyball
Boys A	1st runner-up	/	Champion	1st runner-up	3rd runner-up	/	/	4th runner-up	Champion
Boys B	4th runner-up	/	Champion	4th runner-up	4th runner-up	4th runner-up	4th runner-up	4th runner-up	3rd runner-up
Boys C	3rd runner-up	1st runner-up	Champion	4th runner-up	/	/	5th runner-up	Champion	3rd runner-up
Girls A	Champion	/	/	Champion	-	Champion	4th runner-up	Champion	2nd runner-up
Girls B	2nd runner-up	1st runner-up	4th runner-up	1st runner-up	-	Champion	2nd runner-up	2nd runner-up	Champion
Girls C	4th runner-up	Champion	/	Champion	-	/	7th runner-up	1st runner-up	1st runner-up

2007-2008 Results

- Boys Overall: 1st runner-up
- Girls Overall: Champion

	Track & field	Badminton	Basketball	Cross-country	Football	Handball	Swimming	Table tennis	Volleyball
Boys A	5th runner-up	/	Champion	4th runner-up	4th runner-up	/	/	/	3rd runner-up
Boys B	2nd runner-up	4th runner-up	3rd runner-up	5th runner-up	3rd runner-up	/	7th runner-up	2nd runner-up	2nd runner-up
Boys C	3rd runner-up	4th runner-up	4th runner-up	6th runner-up	/	4th runner-up	4th runner-up	Champion	1st runner-up
Girls A	2nd runner-up	/	/	1st runner-up	-	Champion	/	1st runner-up	Champion
Girls B	3rd runner-up	1st runner-up	4th runner-up	1st runner-up	-	/	2nd runner-up	2nd runner-up	4th runner-up
Girls C	2nd runner-up	1st runner-up	4th runner-up	1st runner-up	-	/	4th runner-up	1st runner-up	2nd runner-up

2008-2009 Results

- Boys Overall: Champion
- Girls Overall: Champion

	Track & field	Badminton	Basketball	Cross-country	Football	Handball	Swimming	Table tennis	Volleyball
Boys A	3rd runner-up	/	/	3rd runner-up	2nd runner-up	/	5th runner-up	4th runner-up	2nd runner-up
Boys B	4th runner-up	4th runner-up	4th runner-up	/	/	4th runner-up	3rd runner-up	Champion	3rd runner-up
Boys C	4th runner-up	/	3rd runner-up	7th runner-up	/	3rd runner-up	5th runner-up	Champion	Champion
Girls A	2nd runner-up	/	1st runner-up	5th runner-up	-	Champion	3rd runner-up	2nd runner-up	1st runner-up
Girls B	2nd runner-up	Champion	2nd runner-up	2nd runner-up	-	/	4th runner-up	1st runner-up	1st runner-up
Girls C	1st runner-up	4th runner-up	4th runner-up	1st runner-up	-	/	5th runner-up	4th runner-up	2nd runner-up

2009-2010 Results

- Boys Overall: 1st runner-up
- Girls Overall: Champion

	Track & field	Badminton	Basketball	Cross-country	Football	Handball	Swimming	Table tennis	Volleyball
Boys A	5th runner-up	4th runner-up	3rd runner-up	2nd runner-up	2nd runner-up	/	5th runner-up	/	/
Boys B	5th runner-up	/	/	/	/	4th runner-up	4th runner-up	1st runner-up	4th runner-up
Boys C	2nd runner-up	/	2nd runner-up	2nd runner-up	/	3rd runner-up	1st runner-up	2nd runner-up	4th runner-up
Girls A	2nd runner-up	Champion	3rd runner-up	Champion	-	Champion	3rd runner-up	/	/
Girls B	2nd runner-up	4th runner-up	Champion	1st runner-up	-	/	2nd runner-up	2nd runner-up	Champion
Girls C	2nd runner-up	/	/	1st runner-up	-	/	6th runner-up	Champion	Champion

2010-2011 Results

- Boys Overall: 3rd runner-up
- Girls Overall: 1st runner-up

	Track & field	Badminton	Basketball	Cross-country	Football	Handball	Swimming	Table tennis	Volleyball
Boys A	/	/	4th runner-up	/	/	4th runner-up	6th runner-up	Champion	2nd runner-up
Boys B	/	2nd runner-up	4th runner-up	6th runner-up	/	1st runner-up	4th runner-up	4th runner-up	4th runner-up
Boys C	/	3rd runner-up	/	7th runner-up	4th runner-up	/	5th runner-up	/	1st runner-up
Girls A	7th runner-up	Champion	1st runner-up	/	-	3rd runner-up	/	1st runner-up	Champion
Girls B	7th runner-up	/	4th runner-up	2nd runner-up	-	/	5th runner-up	3rd runner-up	2nd runner-up
Girls C	/	/	3rd runner-up	7th runner-up	-	/	3rd runner-up	Champion	1st runner-up

2011-2012 Results

- Boys Overall: 2nd runner-up
- Girls Overall: Champion

	Track & field	Badminton	Basketball	Cross-country	Football	Handball	Swimming	Table tennis	Volleyball
Boys A	/	4th runner-up	/	/	/	4th runner-up	7th runner-up	Champion	4th runner-up
Boys B	1st runner-up	/	/	/	/	4th runner-up	1st runner-up	4th runner-up	1st runner-up
Boys C	3rd runner-up	1st runner-up	4th runner-up	/	4th runner-up	/	6th runner-up	4th runner-up	3rd runner-up
Girls A	1st runner-up	/	1st runner-up	1st runner-up	-	2nd runner-up	5th runner-up	1st runner-up	2nd runner-up
Girls B	2nd runner-up	/	3rd runner-up	6th runner-up	-	/	4th runner-up	2nd runner-up	3rd runner-up
Girls C	6th runner-up	Champion	/	6th runner-up	-	/	1st runner-up	1st runner-up	/

2012-2013 Results

- Boys Overall: 4th runner-up
- Girls Overall: 1st runner-up

	Track & field	Badminton	Basketball	Cross-country	Football	Handball	Swimming	Table tennis	Volleyball
Boys A	1st runner-up	/	/	/	/	4th runner-up	6th runner-up	4th runner-up	2nd runner-up
Boys B	7th runner-up	2nd runner-up	4th runner-up	/	/	/	7th runner-up	4th runner-up	1st runner-up
Boys C	3rd runner-up	3rd runner-up	/	2nd runner-up	/	/	/	Champion	4th runner-up
Girls A	3rd runner-up	/	2nd runner-up	2nd runner-up	-	3rd runner-up	/	3rd runner-up	4th runner-up
Girls B	3rd runner-up	4th runner-up	2nd runner-up	3rd runner-up	-	2nd runner-up	4th runner-up	2nd runner-up	/
Girls C	4th runner-up	2nd runner-up	/	4th runner-up	-	/	1st runner-up	2nd runner-up	1st runner-up

2013-2014 Results

- Boys Overall: 2nd runner-up
- Girls Overall: 1st runner-up

	Track & field	Badminton	Basketball	Cross-country	Football	Handball	Swimming	Table tennis	Volleyball
Boys A	4th runner-up	4th runner-up	3rd runner-up	5th runner-up	/	3rd runner-up	4th runner-up	4th runner-up	1st runner-up
Boys B	5th runner-up	/	/	4th runner-up	/	/	/	/	2nd runner-up
Boys C	2nd runner-up	4th runner-up	4th runner-up	1st runner-up	4th runner-up	/	/	2nd runner-up	4th runner-up
Girls A	2nd runner-up	/	3rd runner-up	Champion	-	/	5th runner-up	2nd runner-up	4th runner-up
Girls B	4th runner-up	/	/	4th runner-up	-	/	7th runner-up	1st runner-up	2nd runner-up
Girls C	3rd runner-up	4th runner-up	/	2nd runner-up	-	/	4th runner-up	Champion	2nd runner-up

== Students' Association ==
The Students' Association was established in 1989. Cabinets over the years are listed as follows:

- 1997-1998 Hiu Fung Cabinet (曉雋閣)
- 1998-1999 Wai Fung Cabinet (蔚風閣)
- 2001-2002 Wai Fung Cabinet (蔚風閣)
- 2002-2003 Chi Dung Chi Cabinet (自動治閣)
- 2003-2004 Luen Hup Cabinet (聯合閣)
- 2004-2005 Nei Seung Cabinet (你想閣)
- 2005-2006 Lei Ka Cabinet (利家閣)
- 2006-2007 Ho Mong Cabinet (好望閣)
- 2007-2008 Chek Lap Cabinet (赤臘閣)
- 2008-2009 Triangle 叄角
- 2009-2010 361° Cabinet
- 2010-2011 Leun Hup Cabinet (聯合閣 Unimate)
- 2011-2012 Fung Kwong (風狂 HoFungHolic)
- 2012-2013 Nova
- 2013-2014 Canvas
- 2014-2015 Apex
- 2015-2016 Colibri
- 2016-2017 IOTA
- 2017-2018 Apricity
- 2018-2019 Apeiron
- 2019-2020 Misneach
- 2020-2021 Meraki
- 2021-2022 Novelty
- 2022-2023 Epoch
- 2023-2024 Novus
- 2024-2025 Eunoia
- 2025-2026 Ventus
- 2026-2027 Aretha

== Alumni Association ==
The Alumni Association was established in 1984. The Association aims at bonding alumni and connecting them with the alma mater. Scholarships are offered to current students with academic achievement. The current Chairlady is Ms. Camilla Lee.

== Notable alumni ==
- Mr. Lam, Yat-Yan (YY Lam) - Chinese Tutor at Beacon College
- Edan Lui - Hong Kong singer, actor

== Other SSY institutes ==
=== Education centre ===
- Ho Koon Nature Education cum Astronomical Centre

=== Secondary school ===
- Ho Lap College
- Ho Dao College
- Ho Ngai College
- Ho Yu College and Primary School

=== Primary school ===
- Ho Shun Primary School
- Ho Lap Primary School
- Ho Ming Primary School

=== Kindergarten and nursery ===
- Ho Yu Kindergarten
- Ho Shui Kindergarten
- Ho Lap Kindergarten
- Ho Ching Kindergarten
- Ho Yan Kindergarten
- Ho Tak Kindergarten and Ho Tak Child Care Centre
- Ho Oi Day Nursery
