= Cram schools in Hong Kong =

Overview of commercial tutoring centers in Hong Kong

Cram schools in Hong Kong cater principally to students preparing for local public examinations at the secondary school level, namely the Diploma of Secondary Education (HKDSE), and prior to 2012, its precursors: the Advanced Level (HKALE) and Certificate of Education (HKCEE) examinations.

== Business model ==
Some primary school students and many secondary school students rely on Hong Kong's cram schools to provide them with specialized strategies for public examinations that determine university acceptance. According to the Census and Statistics Department of Hong Kong, one third of secondary school students attended private tutoring in the 2004–05 school year, spending a total of HK$18.9 million per month (US$2.42 million). On the lower estimate, the entire industry is worth more than HK$400 million, and according to other industry reports, the market generates more than US$3.6 billion a year. Historically, Modern Education and Beacon College were the only publicly listed operations within the sector.

These establishments initially catered to a population of roughly 478,000 secondary school students in Hong Kong. The schools focus on teaching specific examination techniques and provide students with tips on topics that may appear on upcoming examination papers. Monthly tuition fees per subject in 2009 were approximately HK$400 (US$51) per student, while individual core courses could cost up to HK$100 per hour. By 2015, fees stabilized around HK$500 due to fierce market competition and declining school enrollment driven by demographic factors. The use of video tutorials, pioneered by Kevin Ko, became a permanent fixture in the local industry. Multimedia broadcasting technology has allowed popular classes to be transmitted simultaneously to hundreds of students across multiple satellite locations.

The Hong Kong Federation of Youth Groups surveyed 524 Primary 5 to Form 6 pupils in 2012; 63 per cent of respondents reported that they were receiving tutoring, with approximately 56 per cent of those students spending at least HK$1,000 per month on tuition fees. The popularity of tutoring has been fuelled by intense social pressures and aggressive competition to secure limited placements at prestigious local universities.

=== Tutor profiles ===
Tutors generally operate as independent contractors who split their generated tuition revenues with the host cram schools. Tutors bear their own commercial overheads, including advertising and marketing expenses, and many hire personal assistant teams to research syllabus changes, compile course materials, and answer student queries. The percentage of gross revenue paid out to a tutor depends on their overall market popularity and whether their classes are delivered live or via video stream, with top-tier talent commanding up to a 60 percent share. Many tutors view themselves as media performers, carefully cultivating their public images and regularly rehearsing their class delivery.

At the market's peak in the late 2000s and 2010s, elite "star tutors" pulled in immense earnings. Public disclosures from the 2014–15 fiscal year showed that Modern Education paid fees ranging from HK$2 million to HK$15 million to its top five tutors, while Beacon College paid its highest-earning tutor an unprecedented HK$35 million in a single year. By comparison, traditional public secondary school teachers' salaries were capped far lower under civil service scales. A notable portion of these celebrity presenters entered the industry from professional modelling backgrounds.

Cram schools intentionally adopt a pop-fandom marketing approach to promote their staff, assigning colourful nicknames like "the Godfather of Science," "Brand-A Tutor," or the "Queen of English." Their promotional campaigns are highly visible on giant roadside billboards, full-page newspaper advertisements, and across public transportation networks like the MTR and buses. Top instructors often retain personal teams of stylists, fashion designers, and photographers to maintain their corporate web portals and promotional materials. Since the mid-2000s, these promotional efforts have heavily expanded into digital media and YouTube video campaigns.

The extreme corporate dependency on individual celebrity teachers was highlighted in late 2015 when Modern Education launched an aggressive public campaign to poach a star Chinese language tutor from rival Beacon College. Modern Education took out full-page advertisements offering an estimated four-year contract package valued at HK$85 million (US$10.97 million) per year, including a HK$30 million signing bonus. Stock exchange filings from Beacon College subsequently confirmed that this single tutor had been individually responsible for generating over 40 percent of the institution's entire corporate turnover across the preceding three fiscal years. Market conditions shifted heavily entering the 2020s, resulting in major structural consolidation and the eventual court-ordered winding up of Modern Education in August 2020.

== Criticism and controversies ==
Fernando Cheung, a former member of the Legislative Council's panel on education, publicly questioned the societal impact of the capital driving Hong Kong's cram culture, stating that children were being pushed into a hyper-competitive system focused entirely on building resumes rather than genuine learning.

The industry has also faced periodic legal issues. In May 2008, the Independent Commission Against Corruption (ICAC) investigated allegations that live HKCEE examination questions had been leaked via text message by a tutor at Modern Education, resulting in the immediate termination of the instructor involved. Intellectual property and contract disputes are common; several prominent tutors have faced multi-million dollar breach-of-contract lawsuits from former educational employers over non-compete clauses.

Satirical depictions of the industry have also caused friction. Film director Oxide Pang was sued for libel by tutor Kevin Ko following the release of the movie Trick or Cheat (《愛出貓》), which Ko alleged was a defamatory caricature of his professional practices. Furthermore, tutors have occasionally faced public scrutiny when their study guides and mock papers contained writing prompts or sample essays that bore uncanny resemblances to live examination questions, leading to accusations of insider information leaks.

== Notable cram schools in Hong Kong ==
According to data from the Education Bureau, there are thousands of registered tutorial centers and regional branches operating across Hong Kong. Historically significant large-scale institutions include:

- Beacon College (遵理學校)
- King's Glory Education Centre (英皇教育)
- Modern Education (現代教育) – Defunct; liquidated in August 2020.
- Defining Education (凝皓教育)
- Logic Tutorial Center
- Calvin Sun Education
