= King's Glory Education Centre =

Cram school in Hong Kong

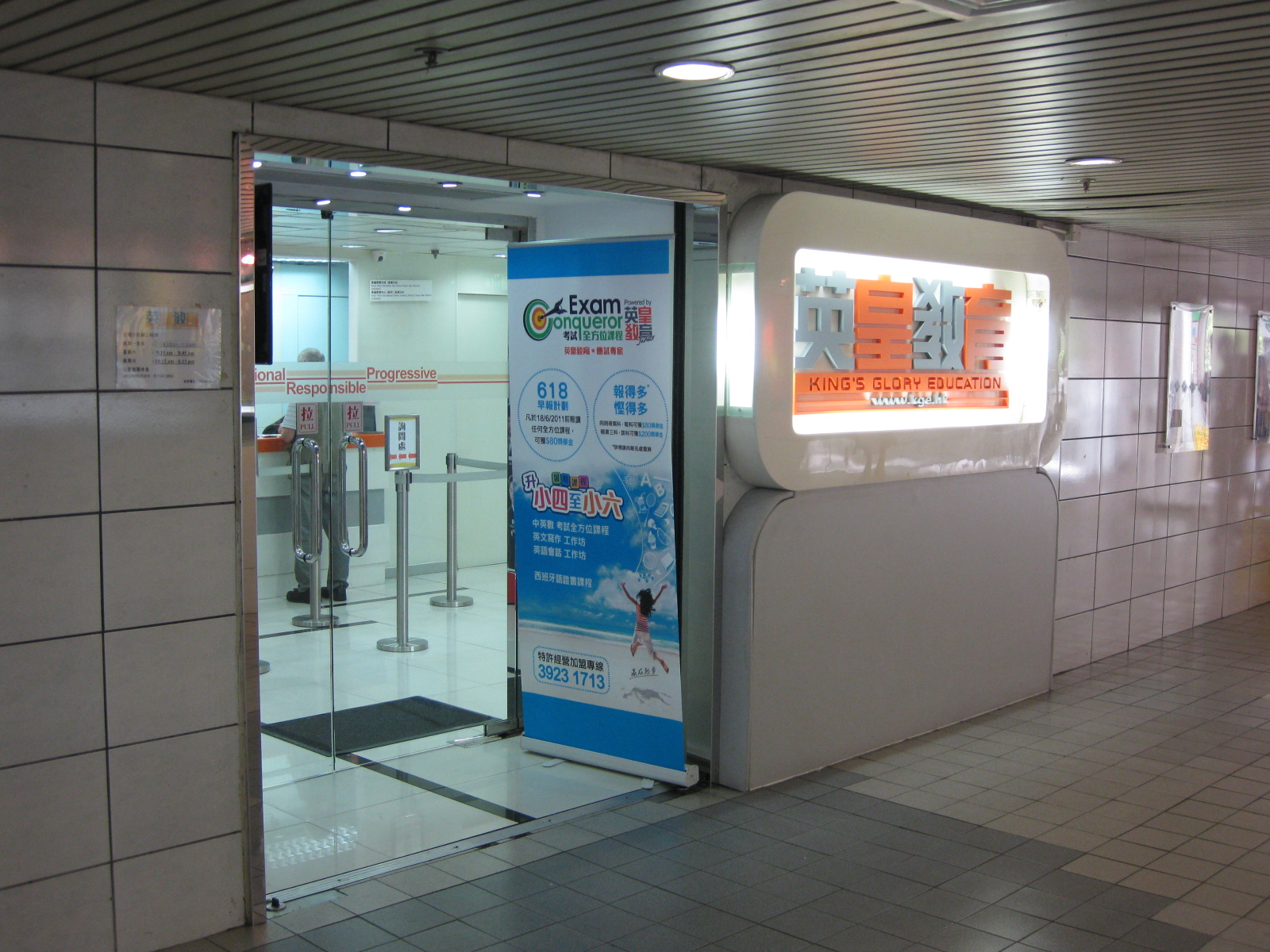
King's Glory Education Tsuen Wan Branch

The King's Glory Education (KGE) Centre is a cram school in Hong Kong founded in 1986 by Shum Yi-Fai (aka "Dr F. Shum"). It is targeted at students at S.6 level (previously S.5 and S.7 levels) who are sitting the HKDSE (combined from the former HKCEE and HKALE exams). It also provides P.4 to S.5 tutorial classes.

== History ==
The school started at an address in Ngau Tau Kok and provided tutorial classes to P.1 to F.3 students. In 1994, the school registered as a tutorial school and moved to Kowloon Bay. From that time, the school provided classes to P.3-F.7 students. In 1996, the school registered new branches in Mong Kok and Tsuen Wan. From 1998 to 2002, many of the school's branches were established all over Hong Kong. By 2007, King's Glory Education had established 11 branches, and it is one of the largest education corporations in Hong Kong.

=== K. Oten case ===
In February 2009, it was reported that former 'star teacher' and business partner Karson Oten Fan Karno, better known as "K. Oten", was in dispute with King's Glory Education Centre (KGEC) following his departure to work for Modern Education. KGEC terminated his contract in April 2006, citing several breaches, including the collection of students' personal data and taking up employment with a rival establishment within one year of termination.Yvonne Tsui & Loretta Fong, Tutorial school sues star teacher for HK$10m, page C4, South China Morning Post, 26 February 2009 KGEC claimed damages of HK$10 million, while Fan countered that the contract expired in 2005 and any subsequent contract was forged, claiming HK$2.65 million in unpaid profit share.

On 15 July 2009, the Court of First Instance found Fan guilty of breaching his employment contract, awarding KGEC damages of HK$8.87 million. The judge criticized Fan's use of vulgar notes and trendy slang, deemed the defence's student witnesses unreliable, and ordered Fan to pay half of KGEC's legal costs.Yvonne Tsui, Teacher to pay $8m to school, page C1, South China Morning Post, 16 July 2009 Fan appealed the decision, but on 9 June 2010, the Court of Appeal dismissed his appeal, upholding the original ruling. Following the failed appeal, Fan applied for bankruptcy in August 2010, citing the financial burden of the damages and legal costs. Subsequently, Fan signed a contract with Contab Education as the chief English tutor, continuing to provide lessons twice a week.

== King's Glory Day School ==
King's Glory Day School is a part of Kings Glory Educational Group, which provides the day-school courses to the S.5 and S.6 HKDSE students, and S.7 HKALE students.

== See also ==
- Beacon College (Hong Kong)
- Modern Education
