= Beacon College (Hong Kong) =

Cram school in Hong Kong

Beacon College Ltd.
- Company type: Public
- Industry: Secondary tuition
- Founded: 1989; 36 years ago
- Founder: June Leung; Christine Ng; Richard Eng
- Headquarters: Hong Kong
- Number of locations: 18 centres (2018)
- Parent: BExcellent Group Holdings Ltd (SEHK: 1775)
- Website: www.beacon.com.hk

Beacon College
- Traditional Chinese: 遵理學校
- Simplified Chinese: 遵理学校
Transcriptions
Standard Mandarin
- Hanyu Pinyin: Zūn Lǐ Xuéxiào
Yue: Cantonese
- Yale Romanization: Jēun léih hohk haauh
- Jyutping: Zoen1 lei5 hok6 haau6

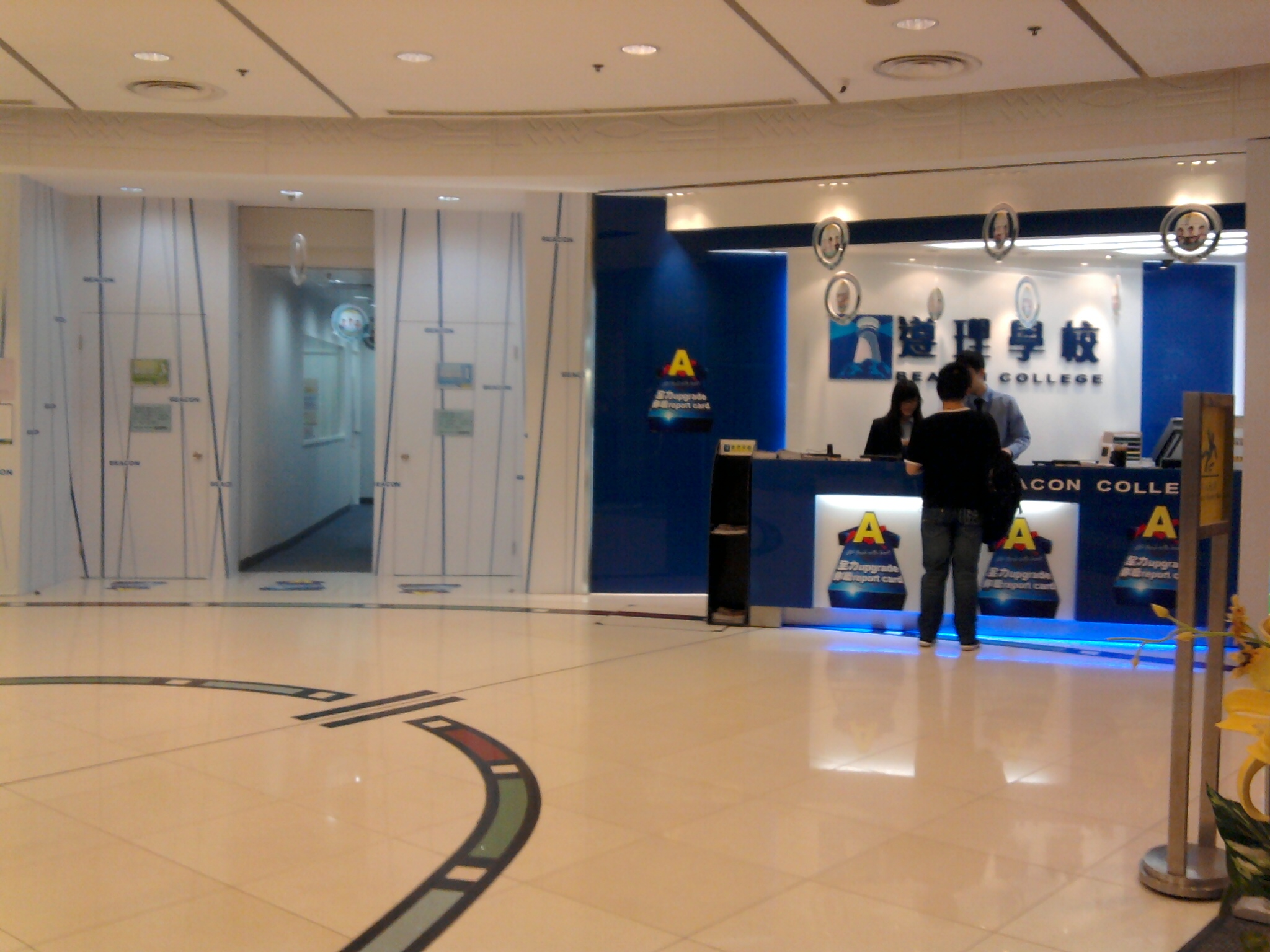
Beacon College centre in Tseung Kwan O

Beacon College Ltd., doing business as Beacon College, is a cram school in Hong Kong. It was founded in 1989 by June Leung, Christine Ng and Richard Eng in Yuen Long. The school provides secondary tutorial classes for students sitting for the Hong Kong Diploma of Secondary Education, day-time secondary courses, pre-education courses and life-learning courses.

The company is reported to be the largest private supplementary secondary school education services provider in Hong Kong. The BExcellent Group is the listed parent company of Beacon College. It was created through a corporate restructuring of the Beacon Group on June 30, 2018.

== History ==
Beacon College was founded in 1989, and was then expanded to different regions in Hong Kong. In 2015, the college applied for their IPO but was rejected in 2016.

In November 2017, Beacon applied for their IPO again under the name of BExcellent Group Holdings Ltd. In June 2018, it became a listed company, marking the company the second of its kind to go public, after Modern Education.

== Incidents ==
In 2015, Lam Yat-yan (also known as YY Lam), Beacon's Chinese Language tutor, received an open letter from opponent company Modern Education, inviting him to join the company after his contract with Beacon College ends. Modern stated that they will offer an annual income of HK$85 million, a four-year contract and additional financial assistance. However, Lam rejected the offer, saying that he had "maintained a good partnership with Beacon College".

In 2016, Liberal Studies tutor Oscar Ma was reported to have been involved in a sexual relationship with a student. A student who had applied for his lesson posted multiple screenshots and videos of their intimate conversations. Later on, Beacon suspended Ma.

In 2017, English Language tutor Patrick Chan Chi-yung (more commonly known as P Chan) was sued by his former employer Modern Education, where he had taught at for 16 years before he entered Beacon College. The lawsuit includes claims for an alleged breach of contract, a third party copyright infringement, and other financial costs, asking for a total of HK$36.3 million.

== See also ==
- King's Glory Education Centre
- Modern Education
