= Shed Skin Papa =

2016 Hong Kong film by Roy Szeto

- Film poster
- Traditional Chinese: 脫皮爸爸
- Simplified Chinese: 脱皮爸爸
- Hanyu Pinyin: Tuō Pí Bà Ba
- Jyutping: Tyut3 Pei4 Baa4 Baa1
- Directed by: Roy Szeto
- Screenplay by: Norihiko Tsukuda; Roy Szeto
- Based on: Nukegara by Norihiko Tsukuda
- Produced by: Julia Chu
- Starring: Francis Ng; Louis Koo; Jessie Li; Jacky Cai; Kristal Tin
- Cinematography: Chow Kei-sheung; Wong Po-man
- Edited by: Wong Hoi; Azrael Chung
- Music by: Leon Ko
- Production companies: Magilm Pictures; Dadi Century (Beijing); Imagine.Nation Pictures; Monster Pictures; Shaw Brothers Pictures International; Sichuan Yinji Entertainment and Media; With You Film Production & Investment; Ray Consulting (Beijing); Golden Gate Productions
- Distributed by: Intercontinental Film Distributors (HK) (Hong Kong); Golden Network Asia (Worldwide)
- Release dates: 26 October 2016 (Tokyo); 10 May 2018 (Hong Kong)
- Running time: 101 minutes
- Country: Hong Kong
- Language: Cantonese

Shed Skin Papa is a 2016 Hong Kong comedy-drama film written by Norihiko Tsukada and Roy Szeto based on Tsuksda's Japanese play Nukegara, and directed by Szeto, who had previously directed an award-winning Hong Kong stage adaptation of the play titled Shed Skin in 2011. The film stars Louis Koo as a washed-out, debt-ridden film director who must take care of his seventy nine-year-old dementia-ridden father (Francis Ng), who begins to shed a layer a skin everyday where regains his youth. Shed Skin Papa made its world premiere at the 29th Tokyo International Film Festival on 26 October 2016 where it was shown in competition for the Tokyo Grand Prix The film was theatrically released in Hong Kong on 10 May 2018.

== Plot ==
Washed-out film director Tin Lik-hang (Louis Koo) is encountering a series of crisis in life. His mother has recently died, his film company is bankrupt and debt-ridden as a result, while wife wants a divorce. On the other hand, he must now take care of his 79-year-old dementia-ridden father, Yat-hung (Francis Ng). In the midst of Lik-hang's miserable plight, Yat-hung suddenly begins to shed a layer of skin every day like a cicada, each time making him look ten years younger, from ages 60 to 52 to 37 to 28 to 19. As Yat-hung approaches the same age as his son, they bond at a football stadium where they used to spend their weekends. Yat-hung even helps frighten debt collectors after his son, and charms both Lik-hang's wife and his mistress. With Yat-hung's six stages of life reappearing, Lik-hang, who never seriously got along with his father, was able to travel into the six eras of his father's life, and gain new understandings for his father, who struggled to make a better life for his family. Lik-hang also has the opportunity to have one final meal with his mother, before returning to his reality with passion anew to revive his own career and marriage after learning from the twists and turns experienced by his father.

== Cast ==
- Francis Ng as Tin Yat-hung (田一雄)
- Louis Koo as Tin Lik-hang (田力行)
- Kristal Tin as Yam Sa-sa (任莎莎)
- Jacky Cai as Chuk Lai-wah (祝麗華)
- Jessie Li as Choi Chi-miu (蔡籽苗)
- Power Chan as Frankie
- Chen Kuan-tai as Brother Tai (泰哥)

== Production ==
To prepare for his role as Louis Koo's father, Francis Ng asked Koo whether he could meet Koo's father and had a meal with Koo and his father to observe their relationship and emulate it into his acting. Ng, whose role's age spans from youth to elderly, was initially only interested in playing the roles closest to his age, but was persuaded by director Roy Szeto to play all age versions of the role.

== Accolades ==
Ceremony	Category	Recipient	Results
29th Tokyo International Film Festival	Tokyo Grand Prix	Shed Skin Papa	Nominated
36th Hong Kong Film Awards	Best Actor	Francis Ng	Nominated
