= Ho Lap College =

Public school in Kowloon, Hong Kong

Coordinates: 22°20′12″N 114°11′44″E

- 15 Tseuk Luk Street, San Po Kong, Kowloon, Hong Kong(香港九龍新蒲崗爵祿街15號), adjacent to the Hong Kong Examinations and Assessment Authority

Information
- Type: Aided School
- Motto: To act benevolently and to teach benevolence (普濟勸善)
- Religious affiliations: Taoism, Buddhism, Confucianism (道、釋、儒)
- Established: 1 December 1969; 56 years ago
- Principal: Ms Lai Lok Ki
- Enrollment: 727
- Language: English
- Website: holap.edu.hk

Ho Lap College
- Traditional Chinese: 可立中學
- Simplified Chinese: 可立中学
Transcriptions
Standard Mandarin
- Hanyu Pinyin: Kě Lì Zhōngxué
Yue: Cantonese
- Jyutping: ho2 laap6 zung1 hok6

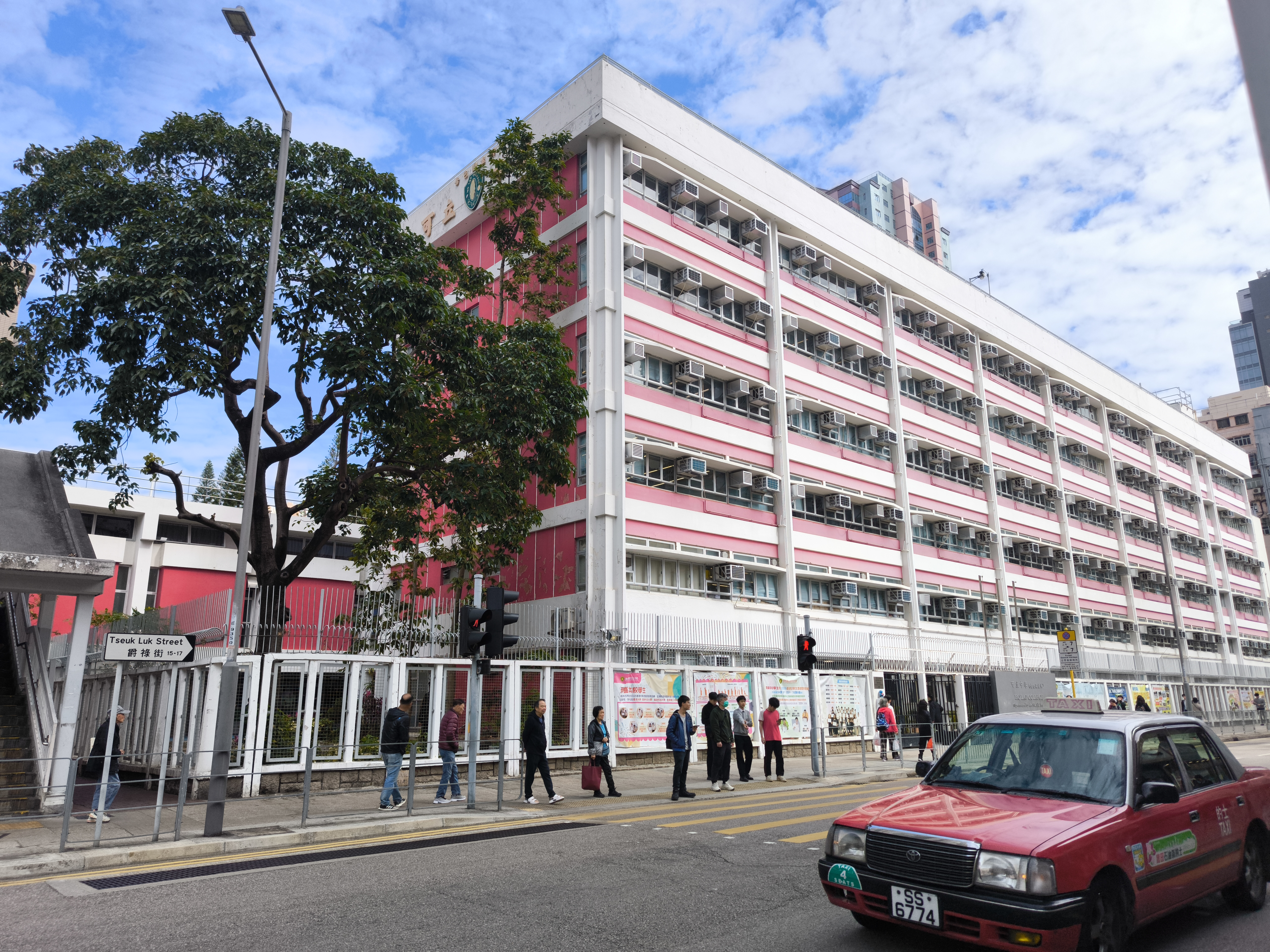
Ho Lap College

Ho Lap College (HLC; Chinese: 可立中學) is a top English grammar co-educational EMI school in San Po Kong, Kowloon, Hong Kong. Founded in 1969.

== History ==
Ho Lap College is the first government-aided secondary school sponsored by the Sik Sik Yuen. Its history dates back to 1961, when a committee was set up to deal with the establishment of a new school. Mr. Wong Wan-tin was elected as the committee's Chief Commissioner. With government funding, the school's foundation stone laying ceremony took place on 7 October 1966, the birthday of Master Wong Tai Sin. Mr. David MacDougall, Registrar General, was the guest of honour. That year was significant as it marked the 45th anniversary of Sik Sik Yuen. When Ho Lap College opened on 1 September 1969, it had 12 classes of about 500 Form1 to Form3 students. The opening ceremony was held in the same year in December, with Mr. J. Canning, former Director of Education, as the guest of honour.

In order to provide students with a better learning environment, two major improvement programmes were implemented. In 1987, Sik Sik Yuen's board of directors granted HK$6,000,000 for the construction of a new wing in the otherwise car-park area. The construction work started in early November 1989 and was completed in July 1991. The school had the honour to have Mr. Lan Hon-tsung, Regional Secretary, to open the new wing on 26 September 1991. The new wing consists of a number of dedicated facilities: Home Economics Room, Design and Technology Room, Science Laboratory, a computer room as well as two remedial teaching classrooms. The school's facilities have been further enhanced under the School Improvement Programme (SIP) in 1997. A green plot was redeveloped into a new annex, with the addition of a new staff room, a conference room and four classrooms. A room on the ground floor was also reserved for the Parents Teachers Association Resource Centre, which hugely helps strengthen the relationship between the parents and the school. The annex under SIP was officially opened by Dr. Cheung Wing-ming on 26 November 1999, the school's 30th anniversary.

Thanks to the donations of Sik Sik Yuen's board of directors, alumni, teaching staffs, students, and parents, an air-conditioned gym was set up in 2004 as a celebration of the school's 35th anniversary.

A nursery originally next to the annex has been converted into an English-Corner area in 2005.

== Administrative history ==
Mr. Wong Cheuk-yin laid the foundations of Ho Lap College in 1969. One year later, Mr Choi Kwok-ping was appointed the principal. Consequently, the school was led by Mr. Choi for almost six years. Then, Mr. Chau Kai-lun succeeded the position and continued to serve the school until August 2000. Mr. Ng Sui-kou then took up the post of principal in September in the same year. Since 2005, Mr. Jacky Ling Kin-chun has been the principal, continuing the effort of bringing the school to a brighter future. Ms Keung Yuen Kwan, Agnes is the next principal starting from 2012, however many of her policies in school were quite controversial.

== School facilities ==
The school comprises 26 classrooms, 2 remedial rooms, 5 laboratories, 1 makerspace laboratory, 2 computer rooms, a geography room, an art and design room, a music room, a home economics room, a library, a student activity room, an interviewing room, a staff common room, a PTA resources room, a conditioning centre and a school hall. All the classrooms, the school hall, and the special rooms are air-conditioned.

The Sik Sik Yuen has been promoting information technology (IT) in education. A network has been set up in 2016 in the school building to link up over 200 computers and 100 notebooks. To facilitate teaching and learning, both staff and students can have access to the Internet in all the staff rooms, classrooms and special rooms through a lease line.

== School newsletter ==
Resonance is the de facto school newspaper of Ho Lap College. It is published once a year, covering students' contributions with topics ranging from science and arts to interesting school news.

Beside Resonance, Ho lap College also have School Newsletter. It is also publish once a year for parents to know more about Ho Lap College.

In 2007, students established Wan Fung(雲峰), a magazine that wholly managed and owned by student. However, due to lack of contribution from other students, it eventually discontinued in 2011.

== Achievements ==
Ho Lap College students achieve different award in different section.

== Co-curricular Activities ==
Ho Lap College offers various co-curricular activities and clubs for students.

== Houses ==
House
Red (R)
Yellow (Y)
Green (G)
Blue (B)

== Transportation ==
Public Transportation	Route	Stop	
KMB/Citybus	3B, 5C, 5P, 5X, 6D, 6P, 106, 106A, 106P, 111, 116, E23, E23A, N23, N121, N216	Choi Hung Road Playground	
KMB/Citybus	5, 6D, 6P, 10, 21	Kai Tak Garden	
Minibus	20M (Every 6 Minutes)	Choi Hung Road Playground	No. 38 Tseuk Luk Street
Minibus	70 (Every 4-15 Minutes)	Choi Hung Road Playground	Kai Tak Garden
Minibus	70A (Every 30-60 Minutes)	Choi Hung Road Playground	Kai Tak Garden
MTR
MTR	Kwun Tong line	Wong Tai Sin station (~11 minutes walk)	Diamond Hill station (~13 minutes walk)
MTR	Tuen Ma line	Kai Tak Station (~16 minutes walk)	Diamond Hill station (~13 minutes walk)

== Notable alumni ==
- Andy Lau (劉德華) — a Cantopop singer, actor and movie star in Hong Kong
- Sun Wai-Keung (辛偉強/申偉強) — a Hong Kong stage and TV actor, 3-times "Best Actor" winner of the Hong Kong Drama Awards, and 19-times nominee for various theatre awards.
- Wong Yeung-tat (黃洋達) — a Hong Kong social activist and the founder and former leader of Civic Passion.

== See also ==
- Sik Sik Yuen
- Wong Tai Sin Temple
- Ho Fung College
- Education in Hong Kong
- List of schools in Hong Kong
