= Modern Education =

Hong Kong cram school

- Type: Public
- Traded as: SEHK: 1082
- Industry: Secondary tuition, especially in the Hong Kong Diploma of Secondary Education
- Founded: 1998; 28 years ago
- Headquarters: Hong Kong

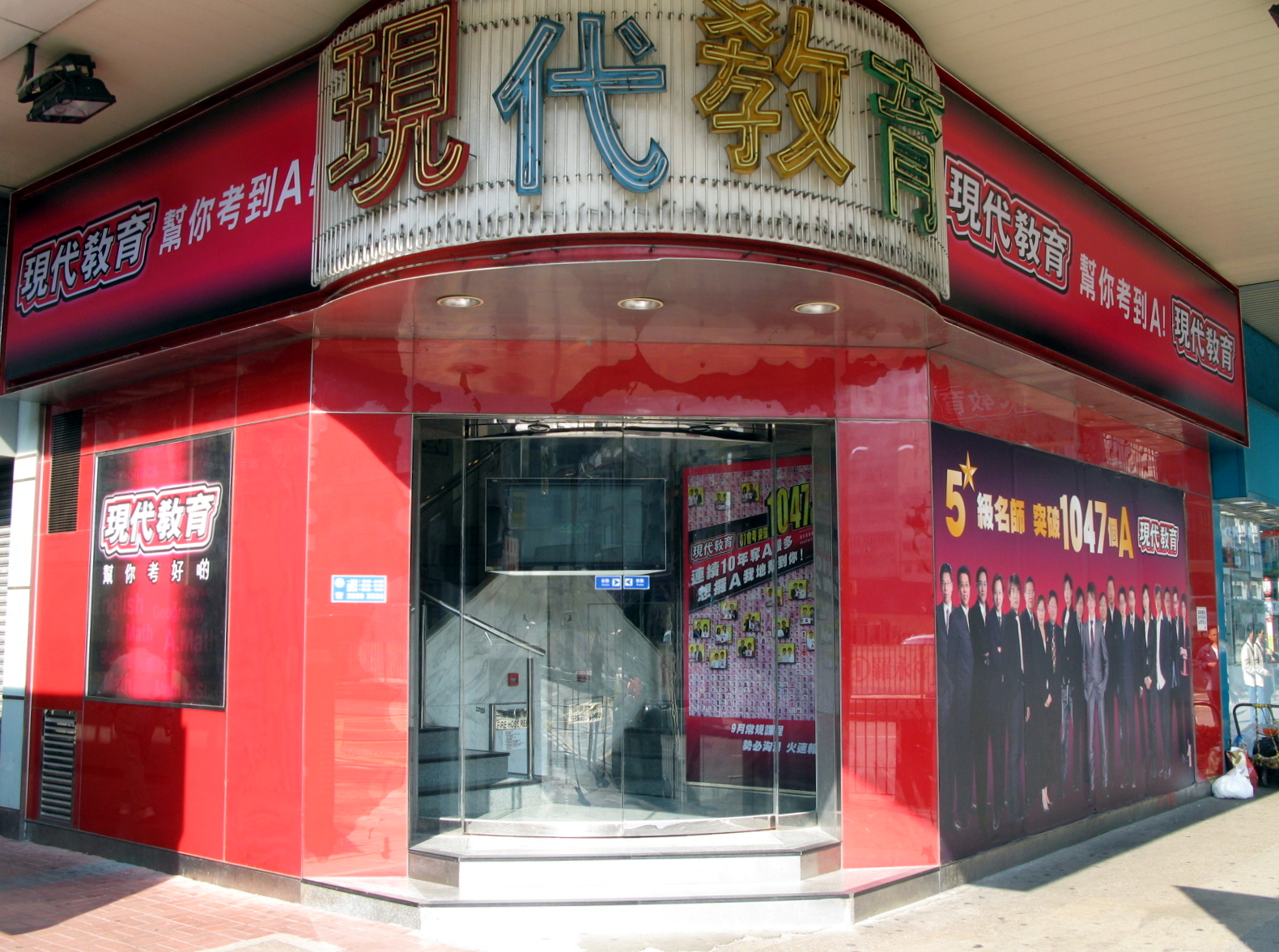
Branch office at Prince Edward Road

Modern Education (Chinese: 現代教育), formerly Intel Education, is a Hong Kong cram school. It was founded in 1988 by Ken Ng Kam-Lun. According to the Education Bureau, there were at its peak 14 branches across Hong Kong Island, Kowloon and the New Territories. It as of 2024 only has one branch in Tsuen Wan following its liquidation in 2020.

The school's curriculum is targeted at primary students and secondary students taking the Hong Kong Diploma of Secondary Education.

The school was the first of its kind to go public, when it listed in HKEx in 2011.

== Ownership ==
The founder and major shareholder of Modern Education Group is Ken Ng Kam-Lun, who teaches English in Modern Education. In 2009, optimistic that the HK government's education reforms would lead to double-digit growth, it was rumoured that Modern Education, which then had 17 centres, sought to raise HK$800 million to increase the number of tuition centres. The company was the first of its kind to go public when it listed in HKEx in 2011. One year after the business listed on the HK stock Exchange, the major shareholder sold his shares just as its student numbers started to decline.

11-07- 2013【Ming Pao】Intel Education invest 50 million to Compass College.

== Tutors ==
Ken Ng, founder, claims credit for initiating this trend, and for "liberat[ing] the very feudal education system" whilst making a lot of money. He also claims credit for democratising access to maximising student performance at public examinations by employing the best teachers from Band One schools.

In late 2015, media reported that Modern Education was overtly trying to poach a "star tutor" employed by a competitor. The tutor, said to have been responsible for over 40 percent of the fees generated by rival Beacon College, was reported to have been offered a lucrative package worth an estimated HK$85 million (US$10.97 million) a year. The package included $30 million signing bonus plus 65% of all the revenue he generates throughout his 4-year contract period. Modern Education took out full-page advertising in two local journals to vaunt its offer publicly. The brazen attempt of Modern Education to poach the Chinese tutor signalled to investors the extent that these schools may be dependent on a single teacher.

== Winding-Up Petition ==
On 26 May 2020, a printer company petitioned to wind-up Modern Education. The Hong Kong High Court ordered it to be wound up on 26 August 2020.

== See also ==
- King's Glory Education Centre
- Beacon College
