= Sheng Kung Hui Tsang Shiu Tim Secondary School =

聖公會曾肇添中學 S.K.H. Tsang Shiu Tim Secondary School
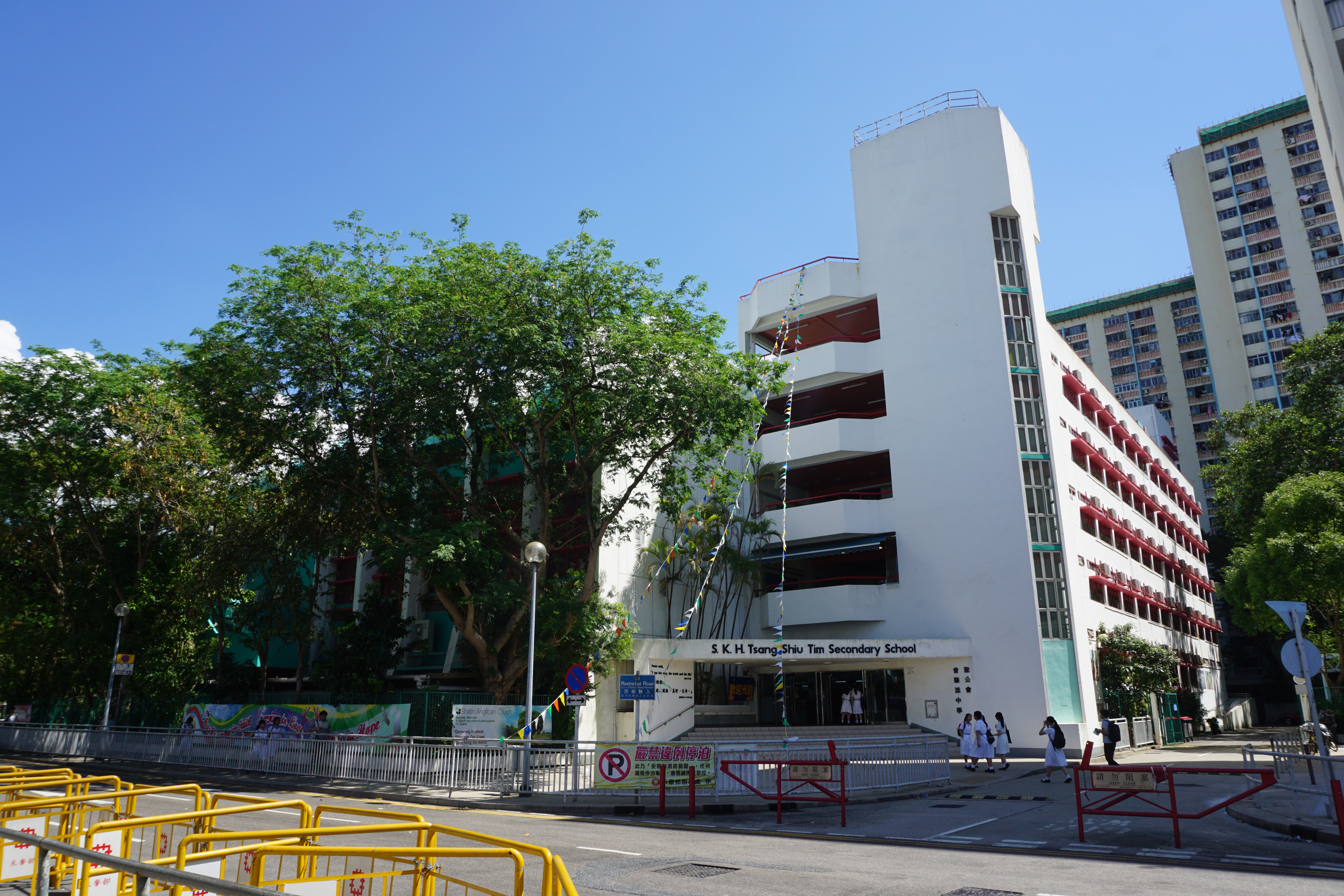
- 280px

Location
- Tak Hau Street, Wo Che Estate, Shatin, N.T. Hong Kong; 22°23′13″N 114°11′43″E

Information
- Type: Government-subsidised grammar
- Motto: Wisdom Perseverance Health Gregariousness
- Religious affiliation: Anglican
- Established: 1978
- School district: Shatin
- Principal: Ms. Lam Mei Yee, Maggie
- Gender: Co-educational
- Language: English
- Colours: Purple and navy; Auxiliary： Red and pale green; Uniform pattern: White and light blue chequers
- Website: www.skhtst.edu.hk

Sheng Kung Hui Tsang Shiu Tim Secondary School (Chinese: 聖公會曾肇添中學) is a school in Hong Kong that was founded in September 1978 by Sheng Kung Hui (Anglican), Diocese of Hong Kong and Macao. Located in Wo Che Estate, Shatin, it is an EMI school (grammar) subsidized by the Hong Kong Government.

== History ==
The school was founded in September 1978, and is of the then-standard inter-locking type of architecture. When first founded the school mainly focused on children living in Wo Che Estate, but that later expanded to children of age across the entire Shatin District. As time went on, the school gradually developed a positive reputation, renowned for its plain school spirit, variety of extra-curricular activities (ECAs), and outstanding academic performance.

=== Timeline ===
- 1978: founding of the school
- 1988: establishment of the Students' Union (SU)
- July 2005: completion of the New Annex
- 2008: Ka Chun Hong, Wai Kwun Kung, Fung Ming Ng and Chi Chung Wan won the Bronze Award in the 2008 Hang Lung Mathematics Awards
- 13 April 2013：35th Anniversary celebrations with performances, a carnival, an open day &c.
- 14 April 2018：40th Anniversary celebrations; completion and commissioning of the Tsang Wing Hing Lecture Theatre
- 15 Dec 2021: Chun Hei Mok, Chi Kong Wei and Wang Kin To won an Honorable Mention in the 2021 Hang Lung Mathematics Awards
- 1 April 2023: 45th Anniversary celebrations
- 21 Dec 2023: Chun Hei Mok and Hei Wong won the Silver Award in the 2023 Hang Lung Mathematics Awards

== Campus and facilities ==
The school campus was commissioned in 1978, and was of standard 1980s campus architecture. In 1978 the school had an area of around 4000 m^2, and had 24 classrooms. As the student population boomed, 2 classrooms, one staffroom, a Students' Union office and a Careers/Guidance Office were added to the Covered Playground in the 1990s. As a result of having more classes than classrooms for prolonged periods of time, the school adopted a policy of shifting classrooms, thus the majority of classes did not have a Homeroom. Later, an additional structure known as the New Annex (新翼) was constructed over the site of one of the initial outdoor volleyball courts, which was completed in July 2005. 6 new classrooms were created, thus allowing each class to have its own Homeroom. The New Annex has lifts, and the corridors/walkways of each level are interconnected to the Old Annex.

=== Tsang Wing Hing Lecture Theatre ===
The Tsang Wing Hing Lecture Theatre was inaugurated during the 40th Anniversary Celebrations on 14 April 2018. Aside from performances, the Lecture Theatre also functions as a Broadcast Room, and seats 110 people. The seats are of the padded cinema type, for ease of use when various functions, lectures, conferences or performances/shows are held. The Lecture Theatre also has wireless internet, a large display screen, and 4K cinematography/photography equipment.

Sheng Kung Hui Tsang Shiu Tim Secondary School
- Institution: Sheng Kung Hui Tsang Shiu Tim Secondary School
- Location: Tak Hau Street, Wo Che Estate, Shatin, N.T.
- President: Wang Yu Tai, Jaxon (Honorary President, ex-officio as the school principal)
- Website: skhtst.school.hk/su

== Houses ==
Students are divided into the four Houses when they start attending the school. The four Houses are named after the School Motto of "Wisdom Perseverance Health Gregariousness". Under the organisation and counting of points by the SU Executive Committee, each of the four Houses participates in the Sports Day, Broadcast Dramas and Inter-House Competitions to compete for the overall yearly "Champion". Teachers-in-charge pick House staff prior to the beginning of each school year, while some members of House staff are elected by the previous cabinet of members.

Chinese name	English name	House Colour
智	Wisdom (W)	Red
毅	Perseverance (P)	Yellow
健	Health (H)	Green
群	Gregariousness (G)	Blue

== Students' Union ==
The school has had a Students' Union (SU) since 1988. The SU has a Union Council and an executive committee. Each SU term lasts from 4 to 3 October the following year. The Union Council is elected each start-of-term by class representatives and some student bodies. Each SU Cabinet (including the chairperson, internal vice-president, external vice-president, treasurer and publicity officer) is elected by current students. In recent years, the election is held in early October or on the next school day after the members' meeting is held, and ballots are counted by teacher consultants and Union Council staff that same day digitally. The remaining members of the executive committee, on the other hand, are nominated by the winning cabinet. Depending on the nominations, these are elected within the Union Council or by casting ballots of trust.

=== School Prefects ===
The school has School Prefects. Prefects stand on duty at the School Entrance before classes start, and patrol the school at non-class hours. Prefects are divided into 3 independent squadrons, and alternate their duty every two school days. Each squadron has a Head Prefect and 2 Deputy Head Prefects, who are hand-picked by Disciplinary Masters. The genders of the 3 Head Prefects are usually diverse.

=== Digital Media and Stage Team ===
Digital Media and Stage Team, which are more commonly known as IT Prefects, are responsible for anything IT-related as their title suggests. IT Prefects were introduced in 1999, and nowadays they assist with fixed work such as Wednesday English Broadcasts and Assemblies. They also act as technical support during large-scale events, and are in charge of the editing and uploading of photos and/or videos showcasing school life at TST. The 18th IT Prefects oversaw the production of publicity videos for the 40th Anniversary Celebrations. Each group of IT Prefects has a Head, 1-2 Vice Heads and 3 Centrals In-charge, as well as a Production Team. Every year, the previous Heads and Vice Heads elect their successors, who in turn select the rest of their team.

=== Extra-curricular Activities, Clubs & Societies ===
Extra-curricular activities (ECAs) are organised by various clubs, societies and other organisations. Examples include the Scrabble Team, the Computer Club, the English Society and the Geography Society. Societies and clubs alike host regular activities, such as the Scrabble Team holding the Scrabble Introductory Class and Scrabble Regular Training Class every year; and the English Society, the Chinese Society and the Putonghua Society co-organizing the annual Singing Contest. Other clubs, like the Computer Club and the Chinese Debating Society, produce electronic and print publications regularly. The Scrabble Team has started holding the TST Scrabble League in school year 2014–2015, making SKHTST one of the only two schools in Hong Kong with a school Scrabble league.

== Cultures & Traditions ==
=== School Badge ===
The School Badge is styled in a manner similar to a coat-of-arms. The supporting Cross symbolises Christian schools, while the initials "TST" and "SKH" represent the School name and founding association of "Tsang Shiu Tim" and "Sheng Kung Hui", respectively. The lower half of the Badge is flanked with a stylised stalk of grain and gears on opposite sides: the stalk of grain symbolises the budding growth of the School and its students; while the interlocked gears represent motivation. At the same time, Shatin, where the school is located in, was undergoing the process of industrialisation i.e. moving away from being a farming-based economy (the stalk of grain) into an industry-based economy (the gears).

=== School Song ===
When the School first opened, it had no official anthem/school song. It was until 2003 when the school decided to compose its own anthem, with lyrics by alumnus Lam Chi-Fung (Chinese:林梓鳳) and music by pianist Fung King-Hei (Chinese:馮景禧), who is also a alumnus. This was then transposed by the music teacher, Ms. Tang Sau-Nam, to make the melody sound "better" and easier to sing. Thus, the school anthem is in A-major. The school anthem leans towards pop music, and coupled along with Cantonese lyrics, it is catchy. Yet, this once again demonstrates the inconsistency of bilingualism. The school song echoes the Motto, and also conveys a religious message and exhortation towards students.

=== Assemblies ===
Assemblies are held every Day 1 and Day 4 of each 6-day Cycle. The school has a longstanding tradition of the Host/Hostess of the Assembly to thank attendees for attending before the Assembly ends, and the attendees reciprocate. This showcases another example of bilingual inconsistency, as the majority of what is talked about during Assemblies (including religious affairs i.e. singing of hymns and psalms, which according to the School should be done in Chinese) is said in Cantonese, whilst it is only until the end when the "gesture of appreciation" is said in English as follows:

Host/Hostess：Thank you for attending the assembly.
Attendees：Thank you.

=== Slogans & Mottos ===
The school has had Mottos and Anniversary Themes/Slogans for many years.

Motto：Wisdom, Perseverance, Health, Gregariousness (智毅健群)
Disciplinary Team Slogan：Be self-disciplined, courteous and rule-abiding (自律、守禮、守規)
35th Anniversary Theme/Slogan：In God we trust. In love we grow.
40th Anniversary Theme/Slogan：Thanksgiving in faith; Serving in Love; Thriving in Hope (感恩・服侍・騰飛)
45th Anniversary Theme/Slogan：Thrive on God's Grace; Soar with Aspirations; Triumph for Excellence

Apart from the Motto, the Cantonese version of the Disciplinary Slogan is the most well known among "TSTers", and it is almost a de facto second Motto. (However, its English equivalent is seldom brought up) Teachers often stress about self-discipline in various occasions, students are renowned for their discipline, and former students and/or alumni typically use this slogan to sum up what they have obtained from studying

=== Retention of Traditional Subjects ===
In recent years, some secondary schools group up subjects other than Chinese, English and Maths into one single entity ("Integrated Humanities") in lower Forms (i.e. Fs.1-3). TST however, retains the following subjects as separate entities: Integrated Science (IS), Chinese History, History, Visual Arts, Computer Sciences and Economics. The school also still organises Home Economics and Design & Technology (D&T) classes for lower form students as a non-elective, and both male and female students have to take both courses every year, alternating by term.

=== Terminology ===
A "class" is a "Form", for example "Form 1A", and a "class teacher" is known as a "Form Teacher". Each Class and Form is abbreviated using "F.", for example "F.1A" and "F.1". Each lesson is known as a "Period", for example, the third lesson is a "3rd Period". Students collectively call themselves "TSTers".

=== Alumni Connections ===
The school keeps in contact with alumni frequently, and the Careers Team is on good terms with the Alumni Association. Alumni strive to repay their alma mater, and often return to become coaches or become "teacher-friends" for students. Every Careers Day each year, many alumni return to TST to share their further study experiences and employment experience, showcasing their support.
