= Language politics =

Concept in language policy

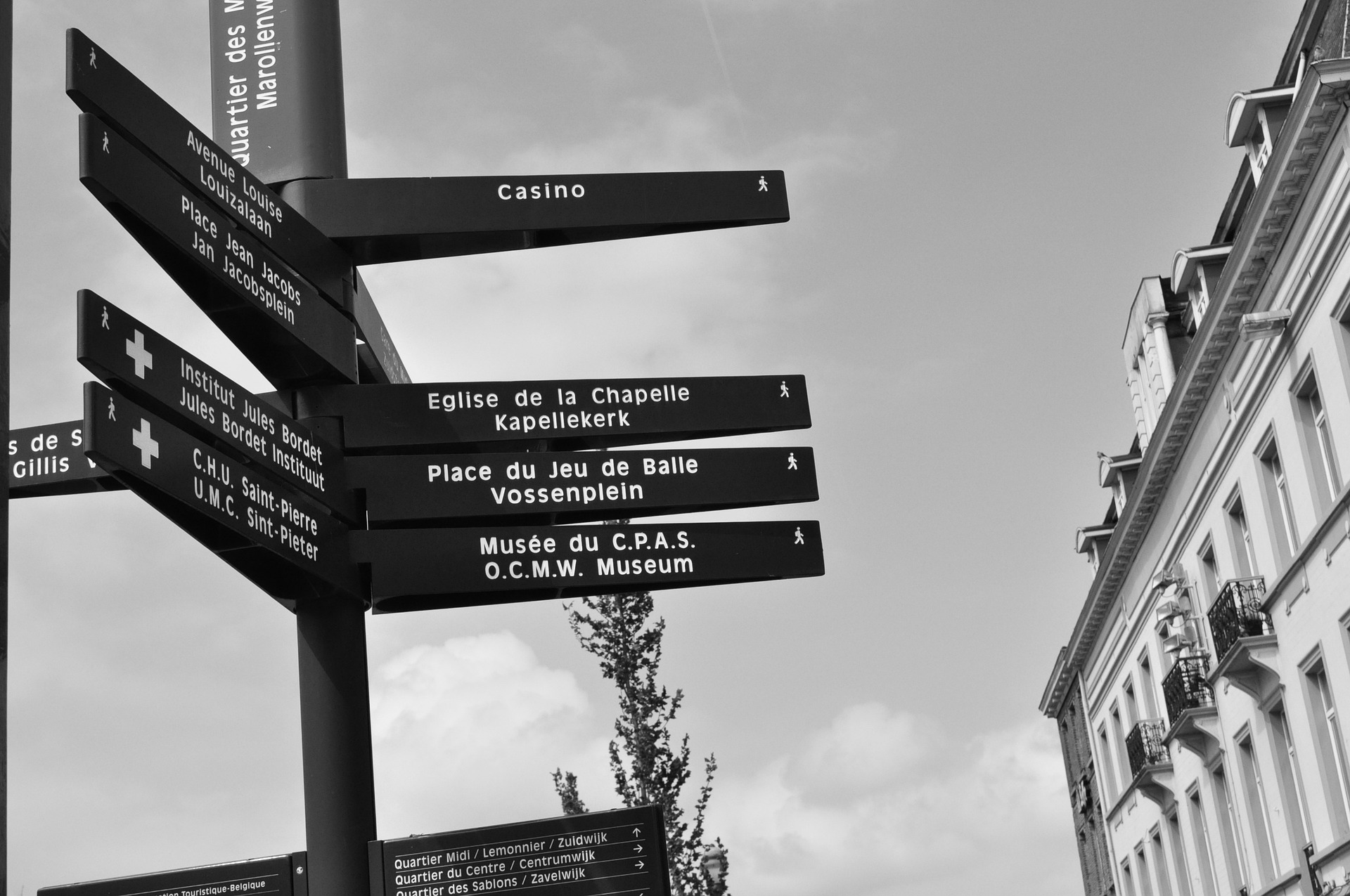
The politics of language are evident in the French/Dutch bilingual Brussels region, which is enclaved within the Flanders region of Belgium, where people typically speak Dutch. Divisive preference of either language is avoided by using both French and Dutch on nearly all signs in Brussels.

Language politics is the way language and linguistic differences between peoples are dealt with in the political arena. This could manifest as government recognition, as well as how language is treated in official capacities.

The topic covers many related issues. As such, this page serves as a central resource for multiple articles relating to the topic of language and politics. Below are some categories dealing with the overlap between language and politics, along with examples and links to other relevant pages.

== Language planning and policy ==
Language planning refers to concerted efforts to influence how and why languages are used in a community. It is usually associated with governmental policies which largely involve status planning, corpus planning and acquisition planning. There are often much interaction between the three areas. Status planning involves giving a language or languages a certain standing against other languages and is often associated with language prestige and language function. Corpus planning often involves linguistic prescription as decisions are made in graphization, standardization and modernization of a language. Acquisition planning fundamentally involves language policies to promote language learning.

=== Status planning ===
- Legal status of a language as an official language in a country, state, or other jurisdiction. This generally means that all official documents affecting a country or region are published in the official language(s), but not in those that are not. Evidence in a court of law may also be expected to be presented in an official language.
- In countries where there are more than one main language, there are often political implications in decisions that are seen to promote one group of speakers over another, and this is often referred to as language politics. An example of a country with this type of language politics is Belgium.
- In countries where there is one main language, immigrants seeking full citizenship may be expected to have a degree of fluency in that language ('language politics' then being a reference to the debate over the appropriateness of this). This has been a feature of Australian politics.
- At various times minority languages have either been promoted or banned in schools, as politicians have either sought to promote a minority language with an aim of strengthening the cultural identity of its speakers, or ban its use (either in teaching, or on occasion an entire ban on its use), with an aim of promoting a national identity based on the majority language. An example of recent promotion of a minority language is the promotion of Welsh or Leonese by the Leonese City Council and an example of official discouragement of a minority language is of Breton.
- Language politics also sometimes relate to dialect, where speakers of a particular dialect are perceived to speak a more culturally 'advanced' or 'correct' form of the language. Politicians may therefore try to use that dialect rather than their own when in the public eye. Alternatively, at times those speaking the dialect perceived as more 'correct' may try to use another dialect when in the public eye to be seen as a 'man/woman of the people'.

=== Corpus planning ===
Corpus planning consists of three traditionally recognised forms: graphization, standardization and modernization. Graphization involves the development of written scripts and orthography of languages. Standardization involves giving a selected variety of a language precedence over the other varieties as the "standard" form for others to emulate. Modernization often involves expanding the lexicon of a language as a result of language shift over time.

- To promote national identity, what are strictly dialects of the same language may be promoted as separate languages to promote a sense of national identity (examples include Danish and Norwegian, and Serbian and Croatian – the latter two also use different scripts for what is linguistically the same language – Cyrillic for Serbian and roman script for Croatian). Whether or not something is a language can also involve language politics, for instance, Macedonian.
- On the contrary, to unify the country, China worked towards a common national language with a standard written script (see: Standard Chinese). The efforts started as early as 1912 after the establishment of the Republic of China. Initial efforts tried to create a language that was phonologically hybridised from the existing languages but they later on settled on pronunciations based on the Beijing variety of Mandarin. Nonetheless, there were still influence from the other Chinese varieties in this standard language. All other language varieties are officially known as 方言 fāngyán which directly translates to regional speech or more well known as Chinese dialects despite being mutually unintelligible. However, the different speakers communicate via a common written script known as a unified Chinese script. After the Chinese Civil War, the People's Republic of China continued the efforts of a common national language, renaming the standard language from 国语 guóyǔ ("national language") to 普通话 pǔtōnghuà ("common speech") in 1955.
- 'Political correctness' describes the situation where language forms must be used (or not used) to comply with national (or group) ideology
- Co-existence of competing spelling systems for the same language, associated with different political camps. Examples:
  - Debate on traditional and simplified Chinese characters
  - Simplification of Russian orthography; proposals for such a reform were viewed as subversive in the late years of the Russian Empire and were implemented by the Bolsheviks in 1918, after which the "old orthography" became associated with the White movement.
  - The two spelling systems for the Belarusian language, one of which is associated with the country's political opposition.

Language is also utilised in political matters to unify, organise and criticise in order to unify a political group.

- The Moldovan Cyrillic alphabet preserved in Transnistria.

=== Acquisition planning (language in education) ===
Acquisition planning often manifests in education policies after the status and corpus planning policies have been introduced. These policies can take in the form of compulsory language education programmes, enforcing a specific language of instruction in schools or development of educational materials. In some countries, mainstream education is offered in one language: English in the United States, Italian in Italy, Russian in Russia, just to name a few. In some countries, mainstream education provide education in several languages. This is especially common in countries with more than one official languages. Some countries promote multilingualism in their policies: bilingual policy in Singapore, three-language formula in India, just to name a few.

== Linguistic discrimination ==
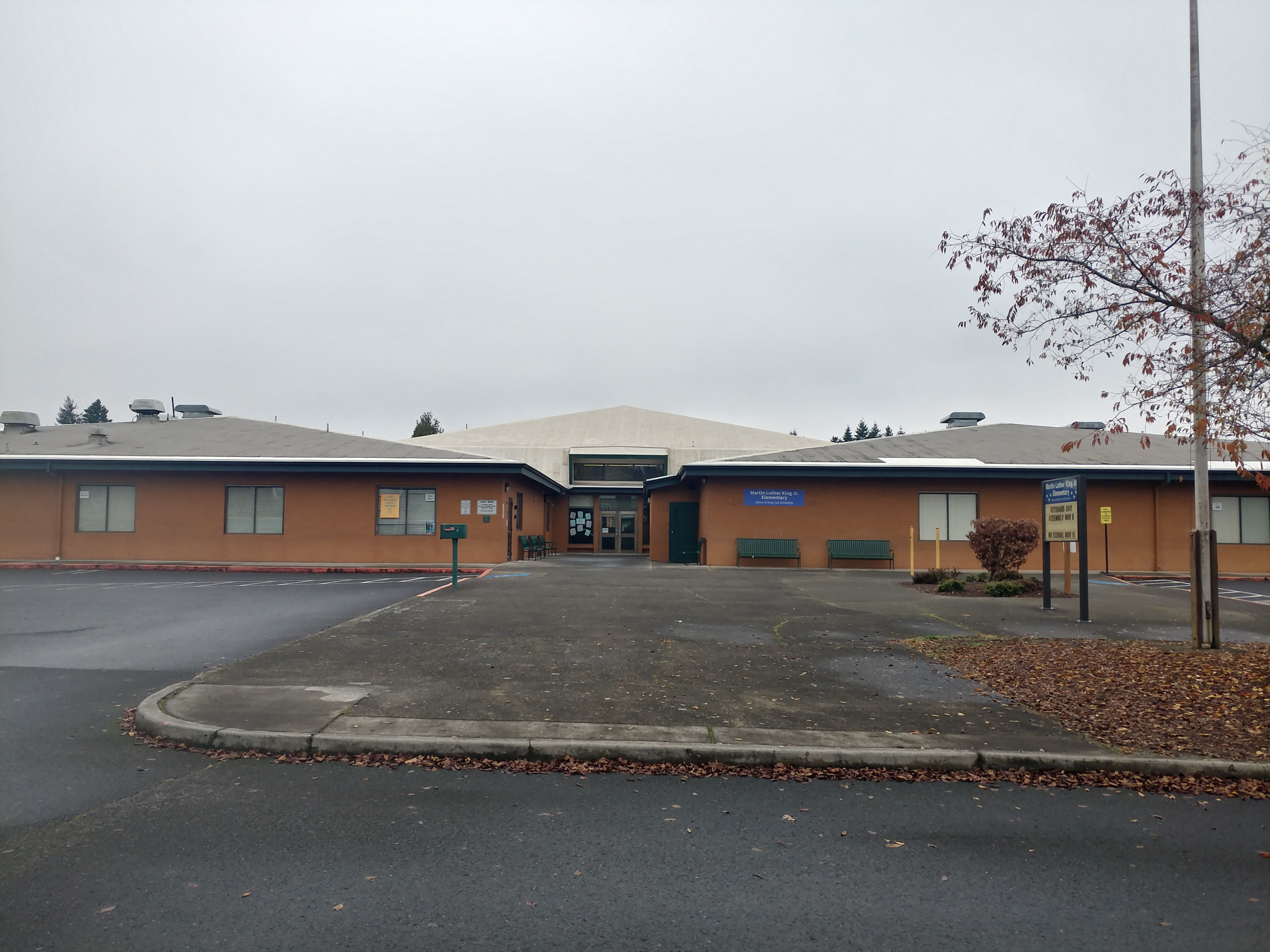
Martin Luther King Jr. Elementary, Vancouver, Washington, building entrance, November, 2019

Linguistic discrimination, or linguicism, refers to unequal treatment of speakers of different languages or language varieties. It can be observed with regard to spoken language, where speakers may be discriminated against based on their regional dialect, their sociolect, their accent, or their vocabulary. In terms of language planning, linguistic discrimination can occur at different stages, such as the choice of one or more official languages, choosing the language of instruction, the availability of essential services such as health care in minority languages, and the protection or lack thereof of minority languages and dialects.

In the United States, speakers of African-American Vernacular English (AAVE) often experience linguistic discrimination. A study, published in 1982, of attitudes towards AAVE at Martin Luther King Junior Elementary school in Ann Arbor, Michigan, revealed that black students who primarily spoke AAVE received less help from their teachers in comparison to their white peers. One social worker observed that these AAVE-speaking students faced a significant linguistic barrier to academic achievement and success in the predominantly White American society at that time. This is one example of a larger controversy surrounding African-American Vernacular English in education.

=== Colonialism ===
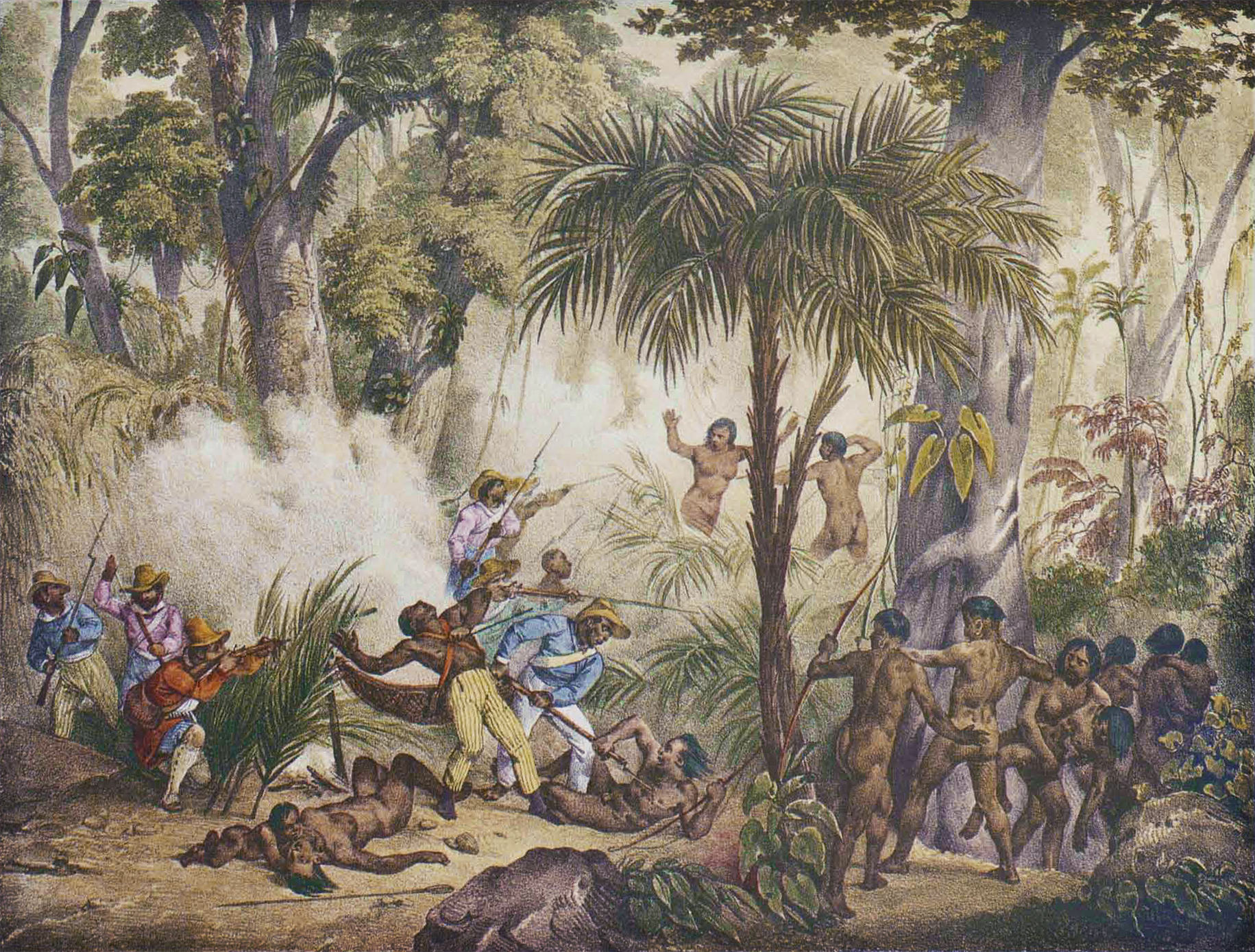
Guerillas rugendas

Colonialism is a significant context in which linguistic discrimination takes place. When territories were colonized for the purpose of settlement building, indigenous languages became gravely endangered because the native speaker groups were either destroyed by war and disease, or had undergone a partial language shift to speak their master's language. In exploitation colonies however, colonizers would usually only teach their language to a select group of locals. In postcolonial states like India, it was observed that the difference in language education had widened the socioeconomic class divide. Thus, access to education, social mobility, and economic opportunities were deprived of the locals who had not learnt the colonial language of before.

Approximately 1.35 billion people in the world now speak English, with about 360 million native English speakers. As of 2015, more than 75% of all scientific papers were published in English. English is also the most commonly studied foreign language in the world. This global prevalence of English can be attributed to many developments that have occurred in recent history, namely, the expansion of the British Empire, which has resulted in the establishment of English as an official language in at least 75 countries. David Crystal gives a detailed explanation about the spread of English worldwide in Chapter 9 of A History of the English Language (ed. Richard M. Hogg). Robert Phillipson has posited this is an example of linguistic imperialism. However, this notion is contested in the field of applied linguistics.

=== Linguistic imperialism ===
Linguistic imperialism refers to the dominance of one language over another on a national (and sometimes international) scale as a result of language policy and planning. According to Robert Phillipson, it is a variant of linguicism and is enacted through systemic changes and language attitudes, resulting in unfair treatment of non-dominant language groups. This form of discrimination works in ways similar to racism, sexism, and classism, on a national administrative scale.

As an example, a case study on the usage of Irish Sign Language (ISL) in Ireland revealed unfair treatment of a deaf community in Ireland. The study observed the enforcement of English over ISL in the educational system, as well as the prohibition of ISL among deaf children who were deemed capable enough to learn oral language (oralism). The study also highlighted anti-ISL language attitudes among school officials, unequal pay of ISL teachers, unequal status given to ISL in the education system, and the systemic marginalisation of ISL users. Efforts to elevate the usage of English over ISL also entailed the teaching of Manually Coded English (MCE) to deaf students, a signed language based on the grammatical structure of English. Unfortunately, MCE and other manually coded languages are often difficult and slow to use for communication among signers. Despite this, such language policies have influenced members of the deaf community (especially older members) to internalise the belief that ISL is inferior to spoken language.

== Names and politics ==
=== Critical toponymies ===
Toponymy is the study of place names (from Ancient Greek: τόπος / tópos, 'place', and ὄνομα / onoma, 'name'). According to Lawrence D. Berg and Jani Vuolteenaho, traditional research into place names has focused more on describing their origins in an empirical way. However, they note that there are 'power relations inherent in geographical naming', because to have the power to name something is to have the 'power of "making places"'. Their book, Critical Toponymies, is, according to them, the 'first interdisciplinary collection published in English that tackles explicitly place naming as "a political practice par excellence of power over space"', and gathers research from various scholars about the politics inherent in the naming of places.

==== Choice of language ====
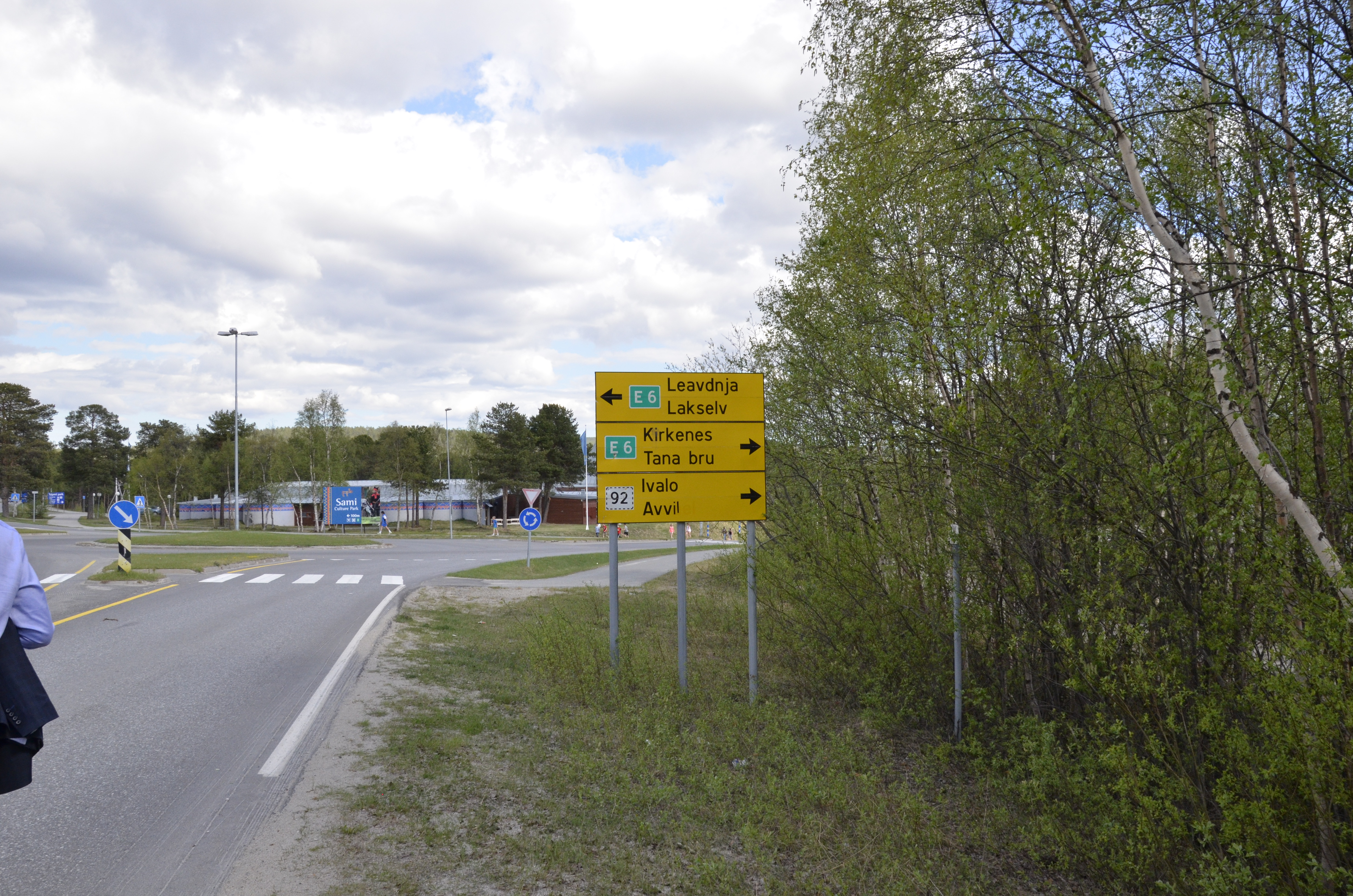
Road signs in Karasjok (Kárášjohka), northern Norway. The top and bottom names are Northern Sámi; the second-from-bottom is Finnish; the rest are Norwegian.

As an example, the powers-that-were in Norway began strictly regulating Sámi place names in the 1870s, replacing them with Norwegian names in official documents, even suggesting that if no Norwegian name had yet been made for a certain place, a Norwegian translation of the name ought to be used on maps. This 'toponymic silence' gave the impression that Norwegians had settled in places where the Sámi historically lived; and the silence lives on till the present—Norwegians may believe that Sámi place names which have not been recorded on maps etc. are not in common use (even though they are); alternatively, since Sámi names for natural features have remained but not names for settlements, Norwegians may believe that Sámi people only reside in otherwise uninhabited areas. Now, even though Sámi place names can be restored to official status, they must still be proven to actually be in use among the community. This is not the case for Norwegian names, which will remain official even if few people in the locality use that name. With these observations, it can be concluded that the Sámi have not received full 'decolonisation' yet - the colonisation being in the Norwegian power to rename Sámi places.

==== Choice of pronunciation ====
In places where native names have been reclaimed in writing, there is a secondary issue of pronunciation. With reference to New Zealand, Robin Kearns and Lawrence Berg note that how a place name is pronounced also has a political meaning. Letters to the editors of New Zealand newspapers sometimes complain about newscasters' choice to pronounce place names in a more Māori-like way. Even if Lake Taupō maintains an ostensibly Māori-derived name, some argued against a Member of Parliament telling others to read it 'toe-po' ([ˈtoʊpɔː]; see Taupō). Kearns and Berg note that the written forms of Māori place names give no hints as to how they should be pronounced, and so even some Māori speakers might not know the 'true' pronunciation. These people might not be trying to make any political statement by reading the names their own way. Even so, their utterance of the name becomes situated in a wider political context of 'a resurgence of Maori cultural forms, and increasing calls for self-determination', which 'presents a threatening and uncertain environment for members of the status quo'. In this way, language in the form of place names becomes part of politics - part of the 'contest over the symbolic ownership of place' in New Zealand.

==== Cross-state conflicts ====
Even across states, agreement on a single name is difficult. This can apply to places which a state does not own: for example, see the Sea of Japan naming dispute or the Persian Gulf naming dispute. Mapmakers often acquiesce by creating two versions of the same map, but with the names of geographical features swapped out depending on which state the maps are sold in. Notably, Greece objected to the use of the name 'Macedonia' by the then newly-independent Republic of Macedonia. According to Naftalie Kadmon, the Greek government was worried that '[c]laims of the South Yugoslavians to the name Macedonia might in time lead to political demands towards Greece, and finally to military aggression.' The case was escalated to the UN and it was decided that the new state would be referred to as Former Yugoslav Republic of Macedonia (FYROM). The naming dispute was resolved in 2019, with the latter being renamed to North Macedonia.

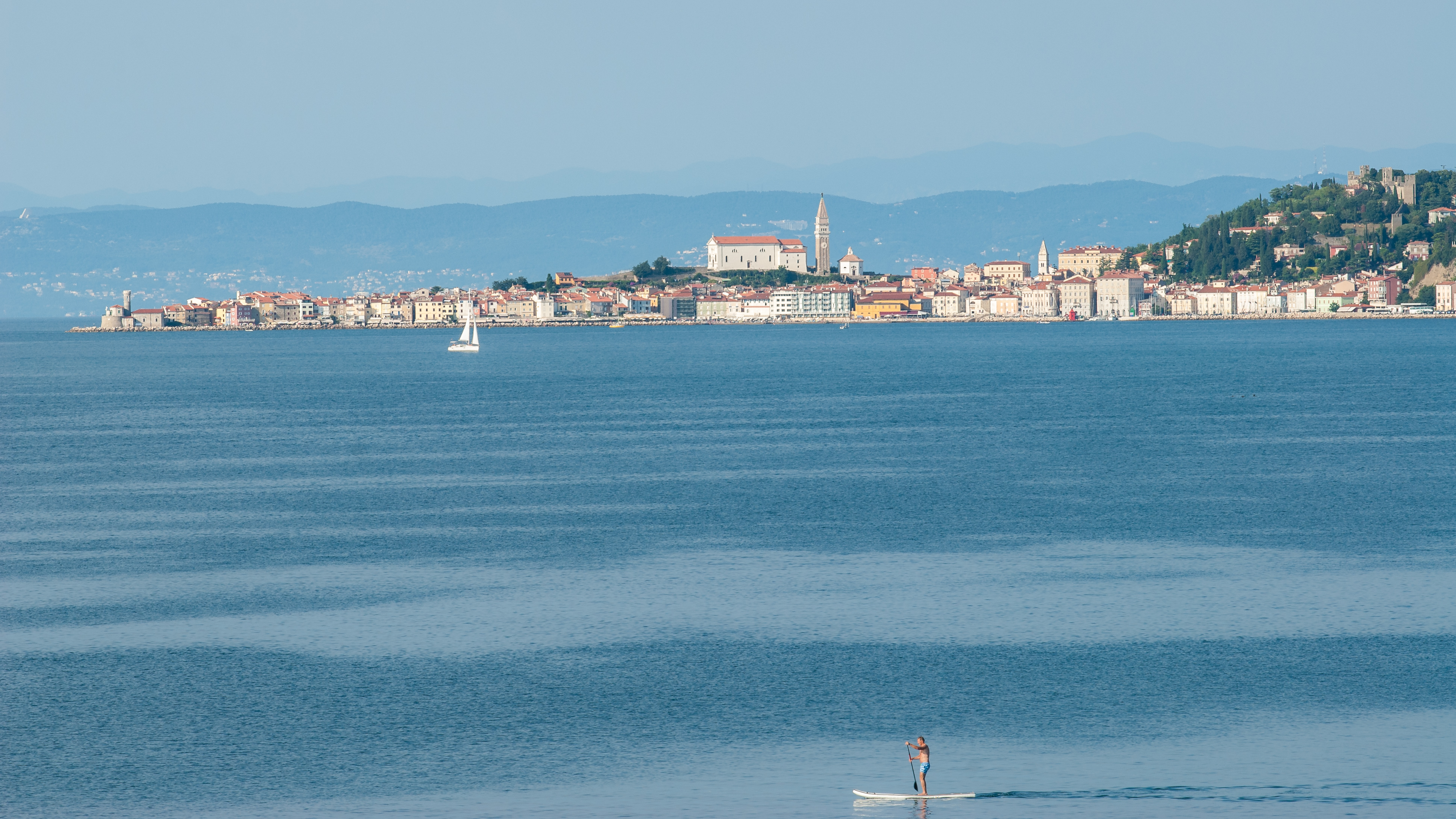
A view of Piran from Savudrija. The Bay of Piran/Savudrija separates these two settlements.

These conflicts between states regarding names still nevertheless indicate a conflict over ownership or belonging. For example, the Bay of Piran between Croatia and Slovenia began being referred to by Croatian official sources as the Bay of Savudrija (Savudrijska vala) around the early 2000s. In both cases, the names of the bay are taken from towns (Piran is in Slovenia, and Savudrija is in Croatia). This recent Croatian insistence on a new name linked to Croatia 'represents a transfer of the identity of the bay elsewhere - to another place far from Piran', and stakes 'Croatia's ownership of this part of the bay'.

==== Recognition of importance of names ====
The United Nations Economic and Social Council (ECOSOC) set up the United Nations Group of Experts on Geographical Names (UNGEGN) and the United Nations Conferences on the Standardization of Geographical Names (UNCSGN). The UNCSGN has three main objectives:

- 'encourage national and international geographical names standardization;
- 'promote the international dissemination of nationally standardized geographical names information; and
- 'adopt single romanization systems for the conversion of each non-Roman writing system to the Roman alphabet.'

The UNCSGN occurs every five years, and the UNGEGN 'meets between the Conferences to follow up the implementation of resolutions adopted by the Conferences and to ensure continuity of activities between Conferences'.

=== Other names ===
The politics applied to naming places can also applies to naming ethnic groups. For example, it is generally offensive to use words which are considered by some to have negative implications (pejorative exonyms) to describe a group of people: e.g. 'Gypsies' (or even more negatively, 'Gypos') instead of 'Romani', or indeed using the term 'Gypsies' to cover Traveller peoples as well as Romani people.

As another example, the Haudenosaunee Confederacy writes that although they have been 'called the Iroquois Confederacy by the French, and the League of Five Nations by the English, the confederacy is properly called the Haudenosaunee Confederacy meaning People of the long house.' The rejection of the exonym 'Iroqouis' (which is still the name used in, for example, the Wikipedia page) is inherent in the statement that the confederacy (and the people) are properly called 'Haudenosaunee'.

== See also ==
- Language policy
