= Monolingualism =

Ability to only speak one language

Monoglottism (Greek μόνος monos, "alone, solitary", + γλῶττα glotta, "tongue, language") or, more commonly, monolingualism or unilingualism is the condition of being able to speak only a single language, as opposed to multilingualism. In a different context, "unilingualism" may refer to a language policy which enforces an official or national language over others.

Being monolingual or unilingual is also said of a text, dictionary, or conversation written or conducted in only one language, and of an entity in which a single language is either used or officially recognized (in particular when being compared with bilingual or multilingual entities or in the presence of individuals speaking different languages). Note that monoglottism can only refer to lacking the ability to speak several languages. Multilingual speakers outnumber monolingual speakers in the world's population.

Suzzane Romaine pointed out, in her 1995 book Bilingualism, that it would be weird to find a book titled Monolingualism. This statement reflects the traditional assumption that linguistic theories often take on: that monolingualism is the norm. Monolingualism is thus rarely the subject of scholarly publications, as it is viewed to be an unmarked or prototypical concept where it has the sense of being normal and multilingualism is the exception.

The assumption of normative monolingualism is also often the view of monolinguals who speak a global language, like the English language. Crystal (1987) said that this assumption is adopted by many in Western society. One explanation is provided by Edwards, who in 2004 claimed that evidence of the "monolingual mindset" can be traced back to 19th century Europe, when the nation was rising and a dominant group had control, and European mindsets on language were carried forth to its colonies, further perpetuating the monolingual mindset.

Another explanation is that the nations who speak the English language are both “the producers and beneficiaries of English as a global language” and the populations within these countries tend to be monolingual.

== Comparison with multilingualism ==
=== Vocabulary size and verbal fluency ===
According to a study on lexical access, monolinguals often maintain a wider vocabulary in a target language relative to a comparable bilingual, and that increases the efficiency of word retrieval in monolinguals. Monolinguals also access words more often than bilinguals in a target language.

In letter fluency tasks, monolinguals in the study were also able to respond with more words to the letter cue than bilinguals, but such an effect was not seen in bilinguals with a high vocabulary score.

Also, monolinguals performed better than bilinguals on verbal fluency in the study. If the vocabulary abilities were made to be more comparable, however, many of the differences would disappear, indicating that vocabulary size may be a factor that moderated a person's performance in verbal fluency and naming tasks. The same study also found that bilinguals, in a version of the letter fluency task that placed more demand on executive control, performed better than monolinguals. Thus, once vocabulary abilities were controlled, bilinguals performed better on letter fluency possibilities by the enhanced frontal executive processes in the brain.

Bilinguals' overall vocabulary size in both languages combined was equivalent to monolinguals' in one language, even though monolinguals may excel in vocabulary size for the one language they speak. Bilinguals may have smaller vocabularies in each individual language, but when their vocabularies were combined, the content size was approximately similar to that of the monolingual. Monolingual children demonstrated larger vocabulary scored than their bilingual peers, but bilingual children's vocabulary scores still increased with age, just like the monolingual children's vocabulary scores (Core et al., 2011). Despite a variation in vocabulary scores, there was absolutely no difference between monolingual and bilingual children in terms of total vocabulary size and total vocabulary gains (Core et al., 2011). Bilingual children and monolingual children have the same vocabulary size and gain the same vocabulary knowledge.

=== Creative functioning ===
In a study testing for creative functioning that involved monolingual and bilingual children in Singapore, researchers found that monolinguals performed better on fluency and flexibility than bilinguals. The trend was reversed, however, on tests for originality and elaboration.

=== Mental well-being ===
In another recent study in Canada, it has been shown that monolinguals were worse at the onset of senility than bilinguals. In the study, it seems that being bilingual is associated with a delay of dementia by four years as compared to monolinguals. Bialystok's most recent work also shows that lifelong bilingualism can delay symptoms of dementia.

It is believed that bilingualism contributes to cognitive reserve by preventing effects of cognitive delay and prolonging the onset of sicknesses such as dementia. Cognitive reserve refers to the idea that engaging in stimulating physical or mental activity maintains cognitive functioning (Bialystok et al., 2012). In that case, knowing more than one language is similar to stimulating mental activity. To test whether or not bilingualism contributes to cognitive reserve, Bialystok et al. (2012) looked at hospital records among monolingual and bilingual adults who have dementia. The researchers found that elderly bilingual adults were diagnosed with dementia about three to four years later than elderly monolingual adults. The results have been replicated and validated, with outside factors being controlled. In fact, outside factors such as socioeconomic status and cultural differences always helped monolinguals, making the argument the bilingualism contributes to cognitive reserve even stronger (Bialystok et al., 2012). That finding enhances the fact that bilinguals are at an advantage because of their ability to speak two languages, not because of outside factors. A probable explanation for this phenomenon is that knowledge of multiple languages keeps the brain alert and therefore more mentally aware for a longer period of time.

=== Emotion and behavior ===
A study conducted with children in their early school years suggested that there are emotional and behavioural benefits to being bilingual. In the same study, the findings show that monolingual children, in particular non-English monolingual children, display more poor behavioural and emotional outcomes in their school years. The non-English monolingual children had the highest level of externalizing and internalizing behavioral problems by fifth grade (around 10–11 years of age), even though the children were all measured to have similar levels of internalizing and externalizing behavioral problems at the start. In contrast, the fluent bilingual and non-English dominant bilingual children were found to have the lowest level of these behavioural problems. The authors suggest that monolingualism seems to be a risk factor. However, if there is a supportive school environment with teachers who are experienced in ESL (English as a Second Language), children seem to have better emotional constitution.

=== Memory performance ===
In a study conducted at the University of Florida, which compared Native-English bilinguals to English monolinguals, although there was no difference in accuracy between the two groups, there was a slower response rate from bilinguals on tasks that involve latency of recognition of a list of abstract words and lexical decision tasks, but not in any of the other tasks used in their study. The researchers noted that the tasks where bilinguals had a significant disadvantage were those which were data-driven (subjects were given verbal input and asked to make decisions about it), as opposed to conceptually driven (subjects were asked to produce verbal output). The study differed from prior research in that the bilingual subjects were more balanced in their familiarity with their two languages. Mägiste hypothesized that the bilingual disadvantage could have been due to differential familiarity with the dominant language. They explained that for bilinguals, it could be because the acquiring and using of the second language meant that there was less time to process the first language, as compared to the monolingual participants in the study.

However, evidence from a research study shows that bilinguals have a faster reaction time in most working memory tasks. While a lot of research asserts that monolingual children outperform bilingual children, other research asserts the opposite. Research by Bialystok et al., as reported by Kapa and Colombo (2013, p. 233) shows that bilingual individuals perform better than monolingual individuals on a wide variety of cognitive tests, thus demonstrating cognitive control advantages. Two different concepts, attentional inhibition and attentional monitoring, are used to measure attentional control. In terms of attentional control, early bilingual learners showed the greatest advantage, compared to monolingual speakers and late bilingual speakers. In terms of overall performance on ATN, the three groups performed equally, but when age and verbal ability variables were controlled, there was a difference in reaction time. The early bilingual children's reaction time was tremendously faster than the monolingual children, and only slightly faster than the late bilingual children (Kapa & Colombo, 2013). Early bilingual learners showed that they simply responded most efficiently to the task at hand. The results from this study demonstrate the advantages bilingual children have with attentional control. This is likely because bilingual children are used to balancing more than one language at time, and are therefore used to focusing on which language is necessary at a certain time. By constantly being aware of what language to use and being able to successfully switch between languages, it makes sense that bilingual children would be better at directing and focusing their attention.

=== Verbal and non-verbal cognitive development ===
A 2012 study by the University of York published in Child Development journal reviewed the effects of the development of a child's verbal and non-verbal language, matched between monolinguals and bilinguals in a particular language. Researchers compared about 100 6-year-old monolingual and bilingual children (monolingual in English; bilingual in English and Mandarin, bilingual in French and English, bilingual in Spanish and English), to test their verbal and non-verbal communication cognitive development. The research takes into consideration factors like the similarity of the language, the cultural background and education experience. These students mostly come from public schools from various areas, having similar social and economic background.

Results show that in the child's early stage, multilingual kids are very different from one another in their language and cognitive skills development, and also when compared to monolingual children. When compared to monolinguals, multilingual children are slower in building up their vocabulary in every language. However, their metalinguistic development allowed them to understand better the structure of the language. They also performed better in non-verbal control tests. A non-verbal control test refers to the ability to focus and then able to divert their attention when being instructed to.

== Reasons for persistence ==
=== Convergence principle ===
According to the convergence principle, language style tends to change to that of people who are liked and admired. Conversations in which one party speaks a language different from the other persons both are hard to maintain and have reduced intimacy. Thus, speech is usually adapted and accommodated for convenience, lack of misunderstanding and conflict and the maintenance of intimacy. In intermarriages, one partner tends to become monolingual, which also usually applies to the children.

=== Predominance of English ===
The predominance of English in many sectors, such as world trade, technology and science, has contributed to English-speaking societies being persistently monolingual, as there is little incentive to learn a second language if all dealings can be done in their native language; that is especially the case for English-speakers in the United States, particularly the Southwestern United States and most of the Southern United States, where everyday contact with other languages, such as Spanish and French is usually limited. The country's large area and the most populous regions' distance from large non-English-speaking areas, such as Mexico and Quebec, increase the geographic and economic barriers to foreign travel. Nevertheless, the requirement for all school children to learn a foreign language in some English speaking countries and areas works against this to some extent. Although the country is economically interdependent with trade partners such as China, American corporations and heavily-Americanized subsidiaries of foreign corporations both mediate and control most citizens' contact with most other nations' products. There is a popular joke: "What do you call a person who speaks three languages? A trilingual. What do you call a person who speaks two languages? A bilingual. What do you call a person who speaks one language? An American."

== Costs ==
Snow and Hakuta write that in a cost-benefit analysis, the choosing of English as the official and national language often comes with additional costs on the society, as the alternative choice of multilingualism has its own benefits.

=== Education ===
Some of the education budget is allocated for foreign-language training, but fluency of foreign-language students is lower than those who learned it at home.

=== Economic ===
International business may be impeded by a lack of people competent in other languages.

=== National security ===
Money has to be spent to train foreign-service personnel in foreign languages.

=== Time and effort ===
Compared to the maintenance of a language that is learned at home, more time, effort and hard work are required to learn it in school.

=== Job opportunities ===
Kirkpatrick asserts that monolinguals are at a disadvantage to bilinguals in the international job market.

== In the media ==
Lawrence Summers, in an article published in The New York Times, discusses how to prepare for the future advancement of America. He also questioned the importance and necessity of learning foreign languages by remarking that "English's emergence as the global language, along with the rapid progress in machine translation and the fragmentation of languages spoken around the world, makes it less clear that the substantial investment necessary to speak a foreign tongue is universally worthwhile."

Others have disagreed with Summers' view. A week later, The New York Times hosted a discussion among six panelists, all of whom were for learning foreign languages and cited the benefits and advantages and the changing global landscape.

== See also ==
- Multilingualism
- Languages of the United Kingdom
- Languages of the United States
- Linguistic imperialism
- List of multilingual countries and regions
