= Language dominance =

A dominant language may be:

- among the languages known by a multilingual person, the one that they have greater proficiency in
- among the languages spoken in an area, the one with the greatest numbers of speakers, prestige or institutional support

The term linguistic predominance also refers to the legal classification in the Valencian Community between Valencian and Spanish speaking areas.

== See also ==
- Linguistic imperialism
- Lingua franca
- Multilingualism
- Prestige (sociolinguistics)
