= Joseph Bianco =

Joseph Bianco may refer to:

- Joseph F. Bianco (born 1966), United States federal judge
- Joseph Lo Bianco (born 1953), professor of language and literacy education
