= Skutnabb =

Skutnabb is a surname. Notable people with the surname include:

- Julius Skutnabb (1889–1965), Finnish speed skater
- Tove Skutnabb-Kangas (1940–2023), Finnish linguist and educator
