= CanPacific College of Business & English =

English language school in Toronto, Canada

Coordinates: 43°38′50.5″N 79°23′53.6″W

The CanPacific College of Business and English is a private English language school, located in Toronto, Ontario, Canada. It offers English language programs for international students.

The school offers a variety English programs and services which include: General English, Business English, Bilingual Language Skills, Test preparation (IELTS & TOEIC), University and College Pathway, Night school, and Work Experience program. The School also provides accommodation, activities, medical insurance and Airport services.

== History ==
CanPacific College of Business and English was founded by Adam Arezo in 1997. The school welcomes students from different countries to study English.
