= International English =

English language as a global means of communication in numerous dialects

- Language family: Indo-European: Germanic; West Germanic; North Sea Germanic; Anglo-Frisian; Anglic; English; International English
- Early forms: Proto-Indo-European: Proto-Germanic; Proto-West Germanic; Proto-English; Old English; Middle English; Early Modern English; Modern English
- Writing system: Latin (English alphabet); Unified English Braille

Language codes
- ISO 639-1: en
- ISO 639-2: eng
- ISO 639-3: eng
- Linguasphere: 52-ABA

International English is the concept of using the English language as a global means of communication similar to an international auxiliary language, and often refers to the movement towards an international standard for the language. Related and sometimes synonymous terms include: Global English, World English, Continental English, General English and Common English. These terms may describe the fact that English is spoken and used in numerous dialects around the world or refer to a desired standardisation (i.e. Standard English).

There have been many proposals for making International English more accessible to people from different nationalities but there is no consensus; Basic English is an example, but it failed to make progress. More recently, there have been proposals for English as a lingua franca (ELF) in which non-native speakers take a highly active role in the development of the language.

== Historical context ==
=== Origins ===
The modern concept of "International English" does not exist in isolation, but is the product of centuries of development of the English language.

The English language evolved in England, from a set of West Germanic dialects spoken by the Angles and Saxons, who arrived from continental Europe in the 5th century. Those dialects became known as Englisc (literally "Anglish"), the language today referred to as Anglo-Saxon or Old English (the language of the poem Beowulf). However, less than a quarter of the vocabulary of Modern English is derived from the shared ancestry with other West Germanic languages because of extensive borrowings from Norse, Norman, Latin, and other languages. It was during the Viking invasions of the Anglo-Saxon period that Old English was influenced by contact with Norse, a group of North Germanic dialects spoken by the Vikings, who came to control a large region in the North and East of England known as the Danelaw. Vocabulary items entering English from Norse (including the pronouns they and them) are thus attributable to the on-again-off-again Viking occupation of Northern and Eastern England during the centuries prior to the Norman Conquest (see, e.g., Canute the Great). Soon after the Norman Conquest of 1066, the Englisc language ceased being a literary language (see, e.g., Ormulum) and was replaced by Anglo-Norman as the written language of England. During the Norman Period, English absorbed a significant component of French vocabulary (approximately one-third of the vocabulary of Modern English). With this new vocabulary, additional vocabulary borrowed from Latin (with Greek, another approximately one-third of Modern English vocabulary, though some borrowings from Latin and Greek date from later periods), a simplified grammar, and use of the orthographic conventions of French instead of Old English orthography, the language became Middle English (the language of Chaucer). The "difficulty" of English as a written language thus began in the High Middle Ages, when French orthographic conventions were used to spell a language whose original, more suitable orthography had been forgotten after centuries of nonuse. During the late medieval period, King Henry V of England (lived 1387–1422) ordered the use of the English of his day in proceedings before him and before the government bureaucracies. That led to the development of Chancery English, a standardised form used in the government bureaucracy. (The use of so-called Law French in English courts continued through the Renaissance, however.)

The emergence of English as a language of Wales results from the incorporation of Wales into England and also dates from approximately this time period. Soon afterward, the development of printing by Caxton and others accelerated the development of a standardised form of English. Following a change in vowel pronunciation that marks the transition of English from the medieval to the Renaissance period, the language of the Chancery and Caxton became Early Modern English (the language of Shakespeare's day) and with relatively moderate changes eventually developed into the English language of today. Scots, as spoken in the lowlands and along the east coast of Scotland, developed largely independent of Modern English, and is based on the Northern dialects of Anglo-Saxon, particularly Northumbrian, which also serve as the basis of Northern English dialects such as those of Yorkshire and Newcastle upon Tyne. Northumbria was within the Danelaw and therefore experienced greater influence from Norse than did the Southern dialects. As the political influence of London grew, the Chancery version of the language developed into a written standard across Great Britain, further progressing in the modern period as Scotland became united with England as a result of the Acts of Union of 1707.

English was introduced to Ireland twice—a medieval introduction that led to the development of the now-extinct Yola and Fingallian dialects, and a modern introduction in which Hiberno-English largely replaced Irish as the most widely spoken language during the 19th century, following the Act of Union of 1800. Received Pronunciation (RP) is generally viewed as a 19th-century development and is not reflected in North American English dialects (except for an affected Transatlantic accent of the early to mid-20th century), which are based on 18th-century English.

The establishment of the first permanent English-speaking colony in North America in 1607 was a major step towards the globalisation of the language. British English was only partially standardised when the American colonies were established. Isolated from each other by the Atlantic Ocean, the dialects in England and the colonies began evolving independently.

The British colonisation of Australia starting in 1788 brought the English language to Oceania. By the 19th century, the standardisation of British English was more settled than it had been in the previous century, and this relatively well-established English was brought to Africa, Asia and New Zealand. It developed both as the language of English-speaking settlers from Britain and Ireland, and as the administrative language imposed on speakers of other languages in the various parts of the British Empire. The first form can be seen in New Zealand English, and the latter in Indian English. In Europe, English received a more central role particularly since 1919, when the Treaty of Versailles was composed not only in French, the common language of diplomacy at the time, but, under special request from American president Woodrow Wilson, also in English – a major milestone in the globalisation of English.

The English-speaking regions of Canada and the Caribbean are caught between historical connections with the UK and the Commonwealth and geographical and economic connections with the U.S. In some things they tend to follow British standards, whereas in others, especially commercial, they follow the U.S. standard.

== English as a global language ==
Braj Kachru divides the use of English into three concentric circles.

The inner circle is the traditional base of English, and includes countries such as the United Kingdom and Ireland, and the anglophone populations of the former British colonies of the United States, Australia, New Zealand, South Africa, Canada, and various islands of the Caribbean, Indian Ocean, and Pacific Ocean.

In the outer circle are those countries where English has official or historical importance ("special significance"). This includes most of the countries of the Commonwealth of Nations (the former British Empire), including populous countries such as India, Pakistan, and Nigeria; others, such as the Philippines, under the sphere of influence of English-speaking countries. English in this circle is used for official purposes such as in business, news broadcasts, schools, and air traffic. Some countries in this circle have made English their national language. Here English may serve as a useful lingua franca between ethnic and language groups. Higher education, the legislature and judiciary, national commerce, and so on, may all be carried out predominantly in English.

The expanding circle refers to those countries where English has no official role, but is nonetheless important for certain functions, e.g., international business and tourism. By the twenty-first century, non-native English speakers have come to outnumber native speakers by a factor of three, according to the British Council. Darius Degher, a former instructor at Malmö University in Sweden, coined the term decentered English to describe this shift, along with attendant changes in what is considered important to English users and learners. The Scandinavian language area as well as the Netherlands have a near complete bilingualism between their native languages and English as a foreign second language. Elsewhere in Europe, although not universally, English knowledge is still rather common among non-native speakers. In many cases this leads to accents derived from the native languages altering pronunciations of the spoken English in these countries.

Research on English as a lingua franca in the sense of "English in the Expanding Circle" is comparatively recent. Linguists who have been active in this field are Jennifer Jenkins, Barbara Seidlhofer, Christiane Meierkord, and Joachim Grzega.

== English as a lingua franca in foreign language teaching ==
English as an additional language (EAL) is usually based on the standards of either American English or British English as well as incorporating foreign terms. English as an international language (EIL) is EAL with emphasis on learning English's different major dialect forms; in particular, it aims to equip students with the linguistic tools to communicate internationally. Roger Nunn considers different types of competence in relation to the teaching of English as an International Language, arguing that linguistic competence has yet to be adequately addressed in recent considerations of EIL.

Several models of "simplified English" have been suggested for teaching English as a foreign language:

- Basic English, developed by Charles Kay Ogden (and later also I. A. Richards) in the 1930s; a recent revival has been initiated by Bill Templer
- Threshold Level English, developed by van Ek and Alexander
- Globish, developed by Jean-Paul Nerrière
- Basic Global English, developed by Joachim Grzega

Furthermore, Randolph Quirk and Gabriele Stein thought about a Nuclear English, which, however, has never been fully developed.

With reference to the term "Globish", Robert McCrum has used this to mean "English as global language". Jean-Paul Nerriere uses it for a constructed language.

=== Basic Global English ===
Basic Global English, or BGE, is a concept of global English initiated by German linguist Joachim Grzega. It evolved from the idea of creating a type of English that can be learned more easily than regular British or American English and that serves as a tool for successful global communication. BGE is guided by creating "empathy and tolerance" between speakers in a global context. This applies to the context of global communication, where different speakers with different mother tongues come together. BGE aims to develop this competence as quickly as possible.

English language teaching is almost always related to a corresponding culture, e.g. learners either deal with American English and therefore with American culture, or British English and therefore with British culture. Basic Global English seeks to solve this problem by creating one collective version of English. Additionally, its advocates promote it as a system suited for self-teaching as well as classroom teaching.

BGE is based on 20 elementary grammar rules that provide a certain degree of variation. For example, regular as well as irregular formed verbs are accepted. Pronunciation rules are not as strict as in British or American English, so there is a certain degree of variation for the learners. Exceptions that cannot be used are pronunciations that would be harmful to mutual understanding and therefore minimise the success of communication.

Basic Global English is based on a 750-word vocabulary. Additionally, every learner has to acquire the knowledge of 250 additional words. These words can be chosen freely, according to the specific needs and interests of the learner.

BGE provides not only basic language skills, but also so called "Basic Politeness Strategies". These include creating a positive atmosphere, accepting an offer with "Yes, please" or refusing with "No, thank you", and small talk topics to choose and avoid.

Basic Global English has been tested in two elementary schools in Germany. For the practical test of BGE, 12 lessons covered half of a school year. After the BGE teaching, students could answer questions about themselves, their family, hobbies, etc. Additionally, they could form questions themselves about the same topics. Besides that, they also learned the numbers from 1 to 31 and vocabulary including things in their school bag and classrooms. The students as well as the parents had a positive impression of the project.

== Varying concepts ==
=== Universality and flexibility ===
International English sometimes refers to English as it is actually being used and developed in the world; as a language owned not just by native speakers, but by all those who come to use it.

Basically, it covers the English language at large, often (but not always or necessarily) implicitly seen as standard. It is certainly also commonly used in connection with the acquisition, use, and study of English as the world's lingua franca ('TEIL: Teaching English as an International Language'), and especially when the language is considered as a whole in contrast with British English, American English, South African English, and the like. — McArthur (2002, p. 444–445)

It especially means English words and phrases generally understood throughout the English-speaking world as opposed to localisms.

=== Neutrality ===
International English reaches toward cultural neutrality. This has a practical use:

What could be better than a type of English that saves you from having to re-edit publications for individual regional markets! Teachers and learners of English as a second language also find it an attractive idea—both often concerned that their English should be neutral, without American or British or Canadian or Australian colouring. Any regional variety of English has a set of political, social and cultural connotations attached to it, even the so-called 'standard' forms.

The development of International English often centres on academic and scientific communities, where formal English usage is prevalent, and creative use of the language is at a minimum. This formal International English allows entry into Western culture as a whole and Western cultural values in general.

=== Opposition ===
The continued growth of the English language itself is seen by authors such as Alastair Pennycook as a kind of cultural imperialism, whether it is English in one form or English in two slightly different forms.

Robert Phillipson argues against the possibility of such neutrality in his Linguistic Imperialism (1992). Learners who wish to use purportedly correct English are in fact faced with the dual standard of American English and British English, and other less known standard Englishes (including Australian, Scottish, and Canadian).

Edward Trimnell, author of Why You Need a Foreign Language & How to Learn One (2005) argues that the international version of English is only adequate for communicating basic ideas. For complex discussions and business/technical situations, English is not an adequate communication tool for non-native speakers of the language. Trimnell also asserts that native English-speakers have become "dependent on the language skills of others" by placing their faith in international English.

=== Appropriation theory ===
Some reject both what they call "linguistic imperialism" and David Crystal's theory of the neutrality of English. They argue that the phenomenon of the global spread of English is better understood in the framework of appropriation (e.g., Spichtinger 2000), that is, English used for local purposes around the world. Demonstrators in non-English speaking countries often use signs in English to convey their demands to TV-audiences around the globe, for example.

In English-language teaching, Bobda shows how Cameroon has moved away from a mono-cultural, Anglo-centered way of teaching English and has gradually appropriated teaching material to a Cameroonian context. This includes non-Western topics, such as the rule of Emirs, traditional medicine, and polygamy (1997:225). Kramsch and Sullivan (1996) describe how Western methodology and textbooks have been appropriated to suit local Vietnamese culture. The Pakistani textbook "Primary Stage English" includes lessons such as Pakistan My Country, Our Flag, and Our Great Leader (Malik 1993: 5,6,7), which might sound jingoistic to Western ears. Within the native culture, however, establishing a connection between English Language Teaching (ELT), patriotism, and Muslim faith is seen as one of the aims of ELT. The Punjab Textbook Board openly states: "The board ... takes care, through these books to inoculate in the students a love of the Islamic values and awareness to guard the ideological frontiers of your [the students] home lands." (Punjab Text Book Board 1997).

=== Many Englishes ===
A true International English might supplant both current American and British English as a variety of English for international communication, leaving these as local dialects, or would rise from a merger of General American and standard British English with admixture of other varieties of English and would generally replace all these varieties of English.

We may, in due course, all need to be in control of two standard Englishes—the one which gives us our national and local identity, and the other which puts us in touch with the rest of the human race. In effect, we may all need to become bilingual in our own language. — David Crystal (1988: p. 265)

This is the situation long faced by many users of English who possess a "non-standard" dialect of English as their birth tongue but have also learned to write (and perhaps also speak) a more standard dialect. (This phenomenon is known in linguistics as diglossia.) Material is often published in journals requiring different varieties of English and is changed in style and spelling without great difficulty.

As far as spelling is concerned, the differences between American and British usage became noticeable due to the first influential lexicographers (dictionary writers) on each side of the Atlantic. Samuel Johnson's dictionary of 1755 greatly favoured Norman-influenced spellings such as centre and colour; on the other hand, Noah Webster's first guide to American spelling, published in 1783, preferred spellings like center and the Latinate color. The difference in strategy and philosophy of Johnson and Webster are largely responsible for the main division in English spelling that exists today. However, these differences are extremely minor. Spelling is but a small part of the differences between dialects of English, and may not even reflect dialect differences at all (except in phonetically spelled dialogue). International English refers to much more than an agreed spelling pattern.

=== Dual standard ===
Two approaches to International English are the individualistic and inclusive approach and the new dialect approach.

The individualistic approach gives control to individual authors to write and spell as they wish (within purported standard conventions) and to accept the validity of differences. The Longman Grammar of Spoken and Written English, published in 1999, is a descriptive study of both American and British English in which each chapter follows individual spelling conventions according to the preference of the main editor of that chapter.

The new dialect approach appears in The Cambridge Guide to English Usage (Peters, 2004), which attempts to avoid any language bias and accordingly uses an idiosyncratic international spelling system of mixed American and British forms.

== Qualifications ==
Standardised testing in International English for non-native English language speakers has existed for a while. Learners can use their local dialect of English, so it does not matter if they use British or American spelling. The International English Language Testing System (IELTS) is recognised in countries such as the US, the UK, Canada, Australia, and New Zealand, and is the world's most popular English language test for higher education and immigration. Other options are the International Certificate (PTE General) and Cambridge English Qualifications which are also recognised globally and can be used as evidence of a required standard of English.

== See also ==
- African English
- Business English
- Commonwealth English
- English as a second or foreign language
- English for specific purposes
- English-medium education
- Esperanto
- Euro English
- International auxiliary language
- Linguistic imperialism
- Translanguaging
