= Colonialingualism =

Education and policy concept

Colonialingualism is a concept in education and policy referring to the privileging of dominant colonial languages, knowledges, and neoliberal valorizations of diversity. The term was introduced by scholar Paul Meighan in the context of English-language education and has since been applied to broader questions of education, language policy, coloniality, and linguistic and epistemic justice.

The concept describes how dominant, nation-state, official, or colonial languages and knowledge systems may be treated as more legitimate, useful, or valuable than Indigenous, endangered, heritage, or minoritized languages and their associated knowledge systems. It is used to analyze how educational institutions, curricula, pedagogies, assessment systems, and policies may reproduce colonial legacies, imperial mindsets, and inequitable practices, including in settings that formally promote multilingualism, translanguaging, or plurilingualism.

== Definition ==
Meighan defines colonialingualism as "the privileging of dominant colonial languages, knowledges, and neoliberal valorizations of diversity". In the original article, the concept is used to critique forms of English language education that center dominant colonial histories, languages, and knowledge systems while marginalizing Indigenous and minoritized languages.

The term combines concerns about coloniality, language hierarchy, epistemic injustice, and the commodification of language and diversity. It does not reject the learning of dominant languages such as English; rather, it examines how such languages and knowledges may be taught, valued, or institutionalized in ways that obscure histories of colonialism and unequal social, political, and ecological relations.

== Origins and development ==
The term was introduced by Paul Meighan in the article "Colonialingualism: Colonial legacies, imperial mindsets, and inequitable practices in English language education", published in Diaspora, Indigenous, and Minority Education in 2023. The article argues that colonialingualism illustrates the "transformative limits" of translanguaging and plurilingualism when these approaches do not also involve epistemic unlearning and the validation of Indigenous and minoritized languages and knowledge systems.

In 2024, Meighan authored the entry "Colonialingualism in Education and Policy" for the Encyclopedia of Diversity, extending the concept beyond English language education to broader questions of education and policy. The entry describes colonialingualism as operating through language ideologies, pedagogies, and policies that maintain dominant colonial languages and knowledges as central while treating other languages and knowledge systems as secondary, symbolic, or merely instrumental.

A 2026 edited volume, Countering Colonialingualism in Language Education: Research Practices and Pedagogies from the Global South, edited by Paul Meighan and Leonardo Veliz, further develops the concept through case studies, narratives, pedagogical interventions, and curriculum and policy analyses from Global South and Indigenous perspectives.

In 2025, Chaka Chaka and Sibusiso Clifford Ndlangamandla used colonialingualism as a conceptual lens in The Palgrave Handbook of Decolonising the Educational and Language Sciences to examine Eurocentric language ideologies, English linguistic neo-imperialism, and Indigenous and African languages in the South African context.

== Conceptual framework ==
Colonialingualism is concerned with the relationship between language, power, knowledge, identity, and place. Meighan argues that colonial languages may carry colonial legacies and can perpetuate imperial and neoliberal worldviews when they are treated as neutral, universal, or primarily economically valuable.

The concept also critiques the treatment of languages and diversity as decontextualized "resources" or "codes" valued mainly for economic usefulness. In this view, languages are not only communicative systems but are also connected to land, culture, history, identity, community, and ecological knowledge.

In the 2026 edited volume, colonialingualism is described as an ideology-policy-practice-outcome system. The volume argues that colonialingualism operates through ideologies that privilege dominant colonial languages and knowledges, policies that reward them, classroom and institutional practices that normalize them, and outcomes that reproduce linguistic, racial, and epistemic hierarchies.

== Relationship to linguistic imperialism ==
Colonialingualism is related to linguistic imperialism, but the two terms are not identical. Linguistic imperialism generally refers to the dominance or imposition of one language over others, often through political, economic, educational, or cultural power. Colonialingualism includes this concern but places additional emphasis on colonial knowledge systems, epistemic hierarchy, neoliberal valorizations of diversity, and the relationship between language, land, identity, and community.

Meighan locates colonialingualism partly within linguistic imperialism and cognitive imperialism, while also connecting it to human exceptionalism, white epistemological supremacy, and the commodification of language in neoliberal education systems.

== Examples ==
Examples of colonialingual ideologies, pedagogies, and practices identified by Meighan include English-only or dominant-language-only classrooms, ethnocentric "native speaker" materials, decontextualized language-as-resource tasks, the privileging of standardized language forms, the marginalization of land- or place-based education, extractive research methods, and punishment or stigma for speaking heritage, Indigenous, or minoritized languages.

Chaka and Ndlangamandla identify examples of colonialingualism in the South African context, including Eurocentric framings of language, the provincialization of African languages, the dominance of English in global knowledge production, and deficit views of Indigenous and African languages in education and research.

The edited volume Countering Colonialingualism in Language Education applies the concept across multiple educational and policy contexts. Sender Dovchin, Nakarra/Nagada Michelle Martin, and Rhonda Oliver examine Aboriginal language revitalization in Australian classrooms. Stephen May, Peter Keegan, and Mi Yung Park examine Indigenous language revitalization and heteroglossic spaces for te reo Māori in higher education in Aotearoa New Zealand.

Other chapters examine colonialingualism in relation to policy, curriculum, and research methods. Prem Phyak and Tsewang Chuskit discuss Indigenous multilingual education in Nepal and India. Shaila Sultana examines English language education, intellectual sovereignty, and policy and curriculum routes in Bangladesh. Ufuk Keleş and Bedrettin Yazan use dialogic autoethnography to examine colonialingualism and research practice.

Further examples in the volume include African Indigenous knowledge systems and Ubuntu literacies in higher education, life stories of Indigenous peoples in Mexico, bilingual education in Brazil, Sumud pedagogy and linguistic citizenship with Palestinian youth and educators, and refugee learners' experiences of English dominance in Australia.

== In education ==
In education, colonialingualism refers to practices that center dominant colonial languages and knowledges as primary routes to academic success, social mobility, employability, or institutional legitimacy. Meighan argues that English language education may reproduce colonialingualism when it promotes English as neutral or universally beneficial while overlooking colonial histories, Indigenous language loss, and the sociopolitical struggles of minoritized language communities.

The concept has also been used to critique educational approaches that celebrate diversity or multilingualism while leaving dominant colonial knowledge systems, assessment standards, and institutional norms intact. Although translanguaging and plurilingual approaches can challenge monolingual assumptions, Meighan argues that they may still privilege dominant official or colonial languages if Indigenous, endangered, and minoritized languages and knowledges are not meaningfully centered.

Khan, Syed Abdul Manan, and Anas Hajar use colonialingualism as a framework in a study of Pakistani test-takers' perspectives on high-stakes English proficiency testing and educational mobility. Parks, Riches, and Hardin use the concept in a study of ESL teachers' language and professional identities in Quebec school spaces.

== In policy ==
In policy, colonialingualism is used to examine how official language regimes, educational policies, curriculum frameworks, assessment systems, and institutional priorities may maintain unequal relationships between dominant colonial languages and Indigenous or minoritized languages. The concept highlights how policies may celebrate multilingualism or diversity while continuing to prioritize colonial languages and knowledge systems in schooling, governance, assessment, employment, and public life.

Meighan argues that language dominance, shift, or loss should not be treated as natural or inevitable, but as shaped by histories of colonialism, nation-state formation, schooling, and language policy. Chaka and Ndlangamandla similarly discuss colonialingualism in relation to language-in-education policy, the position of African languages, and the role of English in knowledge production and research communication.

== Countering colonialingualism ==
Scholarship on countering colonialingualism emphasizes structural and pedagogical change rather than symbolic inclusion alone. The 2026 edited volume presents approaches including curriculum redesign, Indigenous language revitalization, Global South epistemologies, community-based language education, raciolinguistic perspectives, heteroglossic space-making, autoethnographic methods, place-based inquiry, AI literacies, and policy reform.

Meighan's original article proposes epistemic unlearning and heritage language pedagogy as ways to address colonialingualism in English language education. These approaches seek to validate multiple languages and knowledge systems, including Indigenous and minoritized ones, while challenging the assumption that dominant colonial languages and knowledges should remain the default center of education and policy.

The later edited volume frames countering colonialingualism as a matter of institutional and policy redesign. Its chapters include examples of African and Indigenous epistemologies in higher education, Aboriginal language revitalization in Australian classrooms, heteroglossic spaces for te reo Māori in Aotearoa New Zealand, Indigenous multilingual education in Nepal and India, curriculum and assessment reform in Bangladesh, bilingual education in Brazil, and community-based approaches involving Palestinian and refugee learners. Chaka and Ndlangamandla propose Southern multilingualisms, Southern decolonial language studies, and multi-sited, multiversal, and global-centric views of language as counter-framings to colonialingualism.

== Reception and development ==
The concept has developed across journal, encyclopedia, handbook, and edited-volume scholarship. The original 2023 article introduced colonialingualism in relation to English language education. The 2024 encyclopedia entry broadened the concept to education and policy. The 2025 Palgrave handbook chapter applied colonialingualism to South African language education and language sciences.

The 2026 Routledge volume Countering Colonialingualism in Language Education: Research Practices and Pedagogies from the Global South presents colonialingualism as a framework for analyzing and countering linguistic, racial, epistemic, and colonial hierarchies in education and policy. The volume includes chapters by scholars working in language rights, language policy, Indigenous language education, multilingual education, TESOL, and teacher education, including Stephen May, Prem Phyak, Shaila Sultana, Bedrettin Yazan, and Sender Dovchin.

The concept has also been used in later TESOL scholarship. In TESOL Quarterly, Khan, Manan, and Hajar use colonialingualism with the concept of "Whiteness as futurity" to analyze high-stakes English testing and mobility among Pakistani test-takers. Parks, Riches, and Hardin draw on colonialingualism in their study of ESL teachers' experiences of language and identity in Quebec schools.

== See also ==
- Applied linguistics
- Critical pedagogy
- Decolonization
- Heritage language
- Indigenous language
- Language ideology
- Language policy
- Linguistic discrimination
- Linguistic imperialism
- Multilingualism
- Plurilingualism
- Translanguaging
