= Linguistic imperialism =

Transfer of a dominant language to other people as a demonstration of power

Linguistic imperialism or language imperialism is defined as "the transfer of a dominant language to other people".

This language transfer, or more accurately, unilateral imposition, is a consequence of imperialism. The transfer signifies power, traditionally associated with military power but in the modern context, also encompassing economic power. Typically, aspects of the dominant culture are transferred alongside the language. Geographically, while hundreds of Europe's indigenous languages function as official (state) languages in Eurasia, non-indigenous imperial (European) languages serve this role almost exclusively in the "Rest of the World". In contemporary discourse, linguistic imperialism may also be examined within the framework of international development. It influences the criteria by which organizations such as the International Monetary Fund and the World Bank assess the reliability and value of structural adjustment loans, often reflecting perspectives commonly emphasized in English-language discourse rather than a neutral stance (linguistic relativism).

Since the early 1990s, linguistic imperialism has garnered significant academic attention within applied linguistics. Notably, Robert Phillipson's 1992 publication, Linguistic Imperialism, stimulated considerable debate regarding the phenomenon's advantages and disadvantages. Phillipson's research identified historical critiques of linguistic imperialism, including those from Nazi Germany concerning the British Council (at a time when European aristocracy increasingly adopted English), and Soviet analyses characterizing English as the language of world capitalism and world domination. In this context, criticism of English as a global language is frequently associated with anti-globalism.

== Definition ==
Linguistic imperialism is a form of linguicism which benefits and grants power to the dominating/oppressing language and its speakers. As summarized by linguists Heath Rose and John Conama, Dr. Phillipson argues that the defining characteristics of linguistic imperialism are:

1. As a form of linguicism, which manifests in favoring the dominant language over another along similar lines as racism and sexism.
2. As a structurally manifested idea, where more resources and infrastructure are given to the dominant language
3. As being ideological, in that it encourages beliefs that the dominant language form is more prestigious than others. These ideas are hegemonic and internalized and naturalized as being "normal".
4. As intertwined with the same structure as imperialism in culture, education, media, and politics.
5. As having an exploitative essence, which causes injustice and inequality between those who use the dominant language and those who do not.
6. As having a subtractive influence on other languages, in that learning the dominant language is at the expense of others.
7. As being contested and resisted, because of these factors.

Although it is not easy to determine the intentions of specific policies which have led to linguicism, some scholars believe that intent can be proven by observing whether imperialist practices are continued once their sociolinguistic, sociological, psychological, political, and educational harm of other languages are made aware.

== History ==
The impacts of colonization on linguistic traditions vary based on the form of colonization experienced: trader, settler or exploitation. Congolese-American linguist Salikoko Mufwene describes trader colonization as one of the earliest forms of European colonization. In regions such as the western coast of Africa as well as the Americas, trade relations between European colonizers and indigenous peoples led to the development of pidgin languages. Some of these languages, such as Delaware Pidgin and Mobilian Jargon, were based on Native American languages, while others, such as Nigerian Pidgin and Cameroonian Pidgin, were based on European ones. As trader colonization proceeded mainly via these hybrid languages, rather than the languages of the colonizers, scholars like Mufwene contend that it posed little threat to indigenous languages.

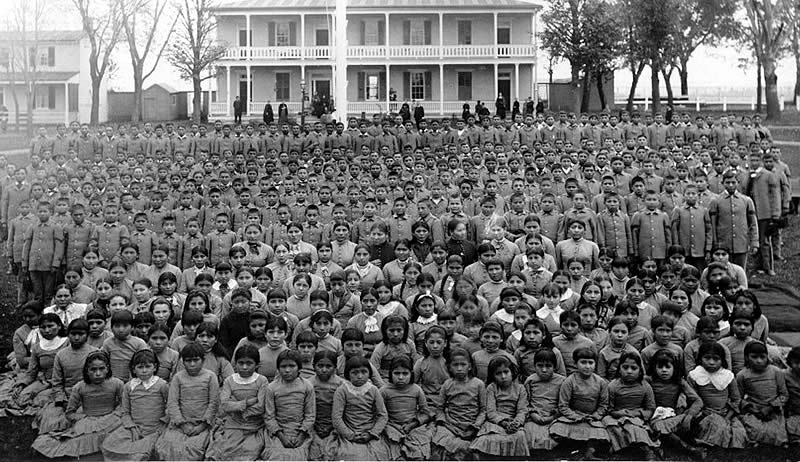
A photo of students at the Carlisle Indian Industrial School

Trader colonization was often followed by settler colonization, where European colonizers settled in these colonies to build new homes. Hamel, a Mexican linguist, argues that "segregation" and "integration" were two primary ways through which settler colonists engaged with aboriginal cultures. In countries such as Uruguay, Brazil, Argentina, and those in the Caribbean, segregation and genocide decimated indigenous societies. Widespread death due to war and illness caused many indigenous populations to lose their indigenous languages. In contrast, in countries that pursued policies of "integration", such as Mexico, Guatemala and the Andean states, indigenous cultures were lost as aboriginal tribes mixed with colonists. In these countries, the establishment of new European orders led to the adoption of colonial languages in governance and industry. In addition, European colonists also viewed the dissolution of indigenous societies and traditions as necessary for the development of a unified nation state. This led to efforts to destroy tribal languages and cultures: in Canada and the United States, for example, Native children were sent to boarding schools such as Col. Richard Pratt's Carlisle Indian Industrial School. Today, in countries such as the United States, Canada and Australia, which were once settler colonies, indigenous languages are spoken by only a small minority of the populace.

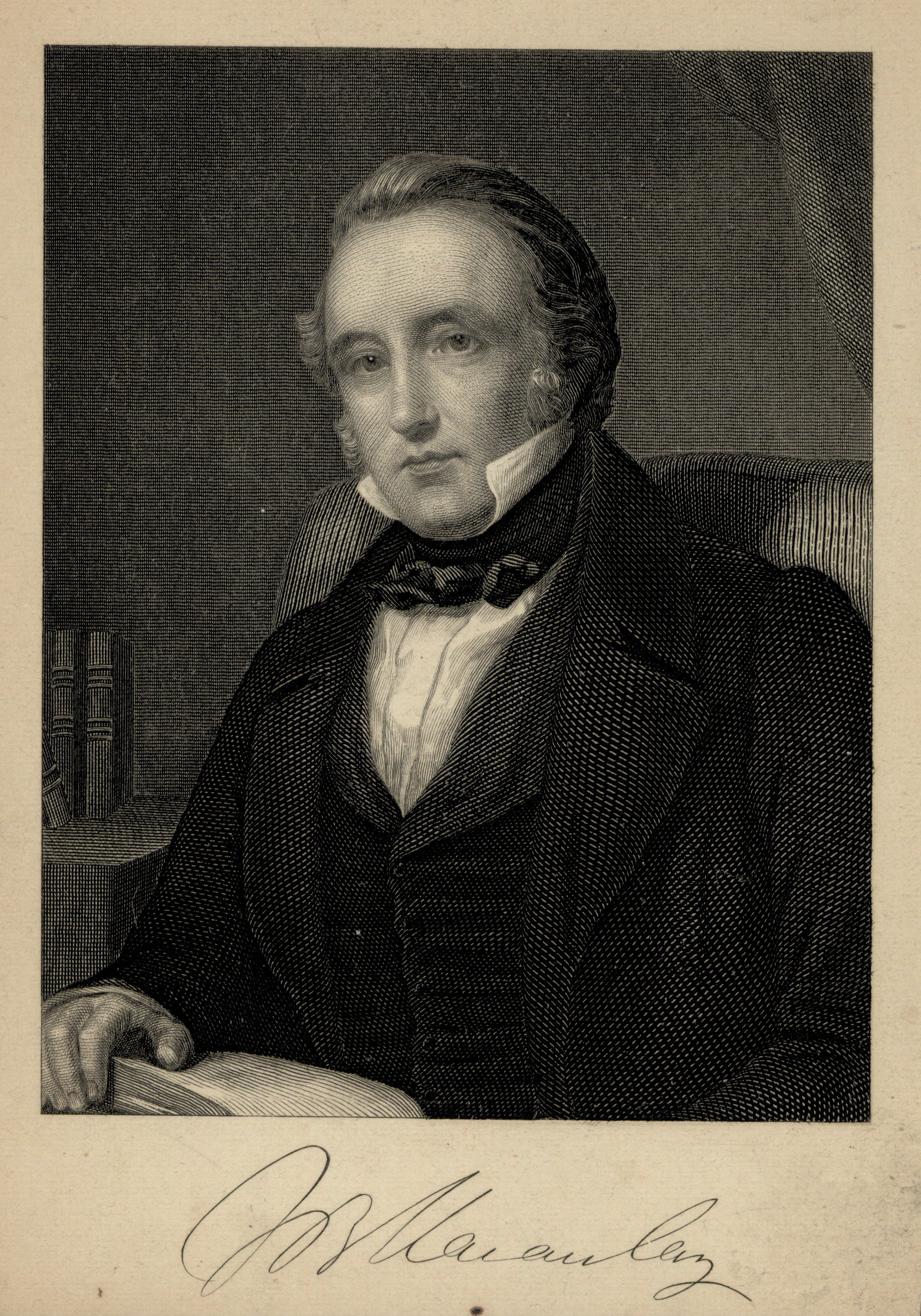
Portrait of Lord Macaulay

Mufwene also draws a distinction between settler colonies and exploitation colonies. In the latter, the process of colonization was focused on the extraction of raw materials needed in Europe. As a result, Europeans were less invested in their exploitation colonies, and few colonists planned to build homes in these colonies. As a result, indigenous languages were able to survive to a greater extent in these colonies compared to settler colonies. In exploitation colonies, colonial languages were often only taught to a small local elite. During the period of British rule in India, for example, Lord Macaulay highlighted the need for "... a class who may be interpreters between us and the millions who govern... a class of persons, Indian in blood and color, but English in taste, in my opinion, in morals and in intellect" in his now-famous "Macaulay minutes", which were written in support of the English Education Act of 1835. The linguistic differences between the local elite and other locals exacerbated class stratification, and also increased inequality in access to education, industry and civic society in postcolonial states.

== Examples by language ==
=== English ===
In Linguistic Imperialism, Robert Henry Phillipson defines English linguistic imperialism as "the dominance of English... asserted and maintained by the establishment and continuous reconstitution of structural and cultural inequalities between English and other languages." English is often called a worldwide "lingua franca", but Phillipson argues that when its dominance leads to a linguicide, it can be more aptly titled a "lingua frankensteinia" by his view.

Phillipson's theory supports the historic spread of English as an international language and that language's continued dominance, particularly in postcolonial settings such as Wales, Scotland, Ireland, India, Pakistan, Uganda, Zimbabwe, etc., but also increasingly in "neo-colonial" settings such as continental Europe. His theory draws mainly on Johan Galtung's imperialism theory, Antonio Gramsci's theory, and in particular on his notion of cultural hegemony.

A central theme of Phillipson's theory is the complex hegemonic processes which, he asserts, continue to sustain the pre-eminence of English in the world today. His book analyzes the British Council's use of rhetoric to promote English, and discusses key tenets of English applied linguistics and English-language-teaching methodology. These tenets hold that:

- English is best taught monolingually ("the monolingual fallacy");
- the ideal teacher is a native speaker ("the native-speaker fallacy");
- the earlier English is taught, the better the results ("the early-start fallacy");
- the more English is taught, the better the results ("the maximum-exposure fallacy");
- if other languages are used much, standards of English will drop ("the subtractive fallacy").

According to Phillipson, those who promote English—organizations such as the British Council, the IMF and the World Bank, and individuals such as operators of English-language schools—use three types of argument:

- Intrinsic arguments describe the English language as "providential", "rich", "noble" and "interesting". Such arguments tend to assert what English is and what other languages are not.
- Extrinsic arguments point out that English is well-established: that it has many speakers, and that there are trained teachers and a wealth of teaching material.
- Functional arguments emphasize the usefulness of English as a gateway to the world.

Other arguments for English are:

- its economic utility: it enables people to get access to some technologies
- its ideological function: it is said as standing for modernity;
- its status might be seen as symbol for material advance and efficiency.

Another theme in Phillipson's work is "linguicism"—the kind of prejudice which can lead to endangered languages becoming extinct or losing their local eminence due to the rise and competing prominence of English.

=== Latin ===
In the Roman Empire, Latin—originally the language of a limited region in central Italy—was imposed first on the rest of Italy and later on parts of Europe, largely displacing local languages, while in Roman Africa Latin was dominant only until it and the native languages were displaced by Arabization.

=== French ===
The English language during the Middle Ages was an object of linguistic imperialism by the French language, particularly following the Norman Conquest. For hundreds of years, French or Anglo-Norman was the language of administration (see Law French) and therefore a language of higher status in England. Latin remained the tongue of church and learning. Although many words introduced by the Normans are today indistinguishable by most English-speakers from native Germanic words, later-learned loanwords, copied from Latin or French may "sound more cultured" to a native English-speaker.

French has also expanded. Languages such as Occitan, Breton, Basque, Catalan and Corsican have been slighted in France. This process, known as Francization, often causes resistance amongst minority peoples, leading to demands for independence. Examples of this can still be found in Breton nationalism and in the Flanders' Flemish Movement in Belgium.

=== German ===
Following the establishment of the Holy Roman Empire over much of present-day Germany and Central Europe, the German language and its dialects became the preferred language of many Central-European nobility. With varying success, German spread across much of Central and Eastern Europe as a language of trade and status; this ended with World War II.

=== Italian ===
In Italy there is a situation similar to the French one, with Italian that has expanded at the expense of languages such as Sardinian, Sicilian, Ladin, Venetian and Friulan, while languages such as German (in South Tyrol) or French (in Aosta Valley), historically persecuted, are now co-official in those regions.

=== Spanish and Portuguese ===
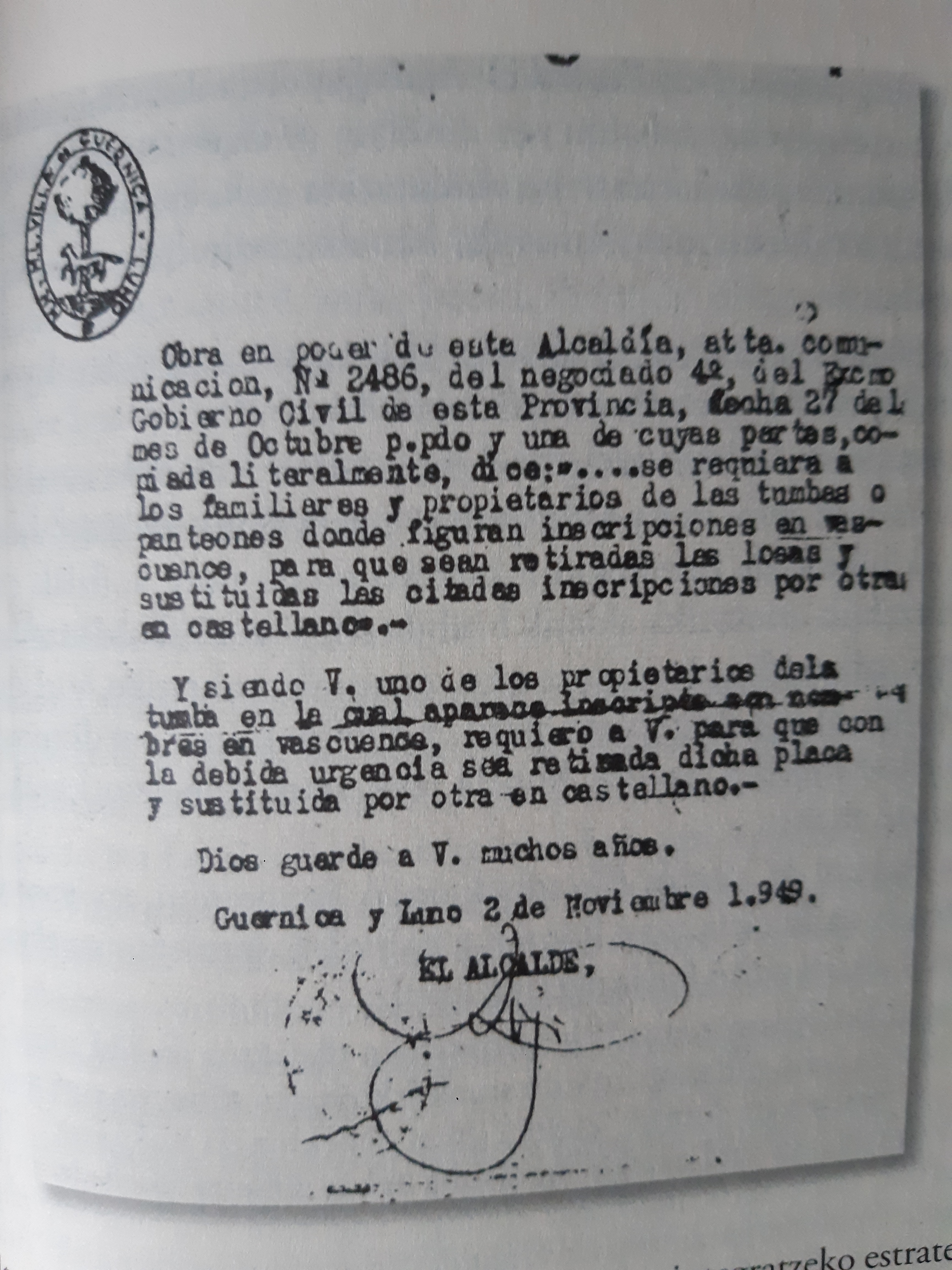
Warrant for the urgent removal of Basque language inscriptions from tombstones in Gernika and its substitution for Spanish (1949), according to ordinance

Portuguese and Spanish colonization made these languages prevalent in South America and in parts of Africa and Asia (the Philippines, Macau, and for a short time Formosa).

In Spain, Spanish spread and was imposed over other languages, becoming the only official language of the state from the 18th to the 20th century. It was labelled "the companion of the Empire" by Antonio de Nebrija (1492) in the introduction to his Gramática de la lengua castellana.

=== Russian ===
Russian linguistic imperialism can be seen in Belarus, both in the former dispute over the name of the country (Belarus or Belorussia) and in the common spelling of the name of the country's president, Alexander Lukashenko (the Russian form is used as the basis for the English transcription of his name, instead of the Belarusian form, Alyaksandr Lukashenka).

=== Hindi ===
In post-independence India, there were attempts to make Hindi as the sole official language which was vehemently opposed by various provinces, particularly by the state of Tamil Nadu.

=== Other regions ===
Anatolia had similar linguistic diversity when it was ruled by small native states. Under the Persian and Hellenistic empires, the tongue of the conqueror served as the lingua franca. The indigenous Anatolian languages disappeared.

Regional languages in Asia and the Americas have been or are being coercively replaced or slighted – namely Tibetan, Uyghur and regional Chinese varieties by Mandarin Chinese, Ainu and Ryukyuan by Japanese, Quechuan and Mesoamerican languages by Spanish, Philippine languages by Filipino, and regional Malayo-Polynesian languages by Malay (including Indonesian).

Arabization has eliminated many indigenous Berber languages in North Africa and supplanted Coptic as the spoken language in Egypt, restricting its use to the Coptic Christian Orthodox and Coptic Catholic Churches as a liturgical language.

== Criticism ==
Many scholars have participated in lively discussions of Phillipson's claims. Alan Davies, for instance, envisions the ghost of Phillipson haunting the Department of Applied Linguistics in Edinburgh:

'Round up the usual suspects', he cries, outing those who have pretended all these years merely to teach applied linguistics, but who have really been plotting with the British Council to take over the world.

For Davies, two cultures inhabit linguistic imperialism: one, a culture of guilt ("colonies should never have happened"); the other, that of romantic despair ("we shouldn't be doing what we are doing"). Rajagopalan goes a step farther and maintains that Phillipson's book has led to a guilt complex among English language learning and teaching (ELT) professionals.

Davies also argues that Phillipson's claims are not falsifiable: what "if the dominated... wanted to adopt English and continue to want to keep it? Phillipson's unfalsifiable answer must be that they don't, they can't, they've been persuaded against their better interests." It has thus been argued that Phillipson's theory is patronizing in its implication that developing countries lack independent decision-making capacity (to adopt or not to adopt ELT). In the context of Nigeria, Bisong holds that people in the "periphery" use English pragmatically—they send their children to English-language schools precisely because they want them to grow up multilingual. Regarding Phillipson, Bisong maintains that "to interpret such actions as emanating from people who are victims of Centre linguistic imperialism is to bend sociolinguistic evidence to suit a preconceived thesis". If English should be abolished because it is foreign, Bisong argues, then Nigeria itself would also have to be dissolved, because it was conceived as a colonial structure.

Furthermore, the assumption that the English language itself is imperialistic has come under attack. Henry Widdowson has argued that "there is a fundamental contradiction in the idea that the language of itself exerts hegemonic control: namely that if this were the case, you would never be able to challenge such control". Additionally, the idea that the promotion of English necessarily implies a demotion of local languages has been challenged. Holborrow points out that "not all Englishes in the centre dominate, nor are all speakers in the periphery equally discriminated against". Hiberno-English or New Zealand English or even England's regional dialects such as Cornish English, for instance, could be regarded as a non-dominant centre variety of English.

Some scholars believe that English's dominance is not due to specific language policies, but rather as a side-effect of the spread of English-speaking colonists through colonization and globalization.

Thus it could be argued that, while those who follow Phillipson see choices about language as externally imposed, the other camp sees them as personal choices.

== Response ==
Those who support the arguments favoring the existence of linguistic imperialism claim that arguments against it are often advanced by monolingual native-speakers of English who may see the current status of English as a fact worthy of celebration.

Those who see the increasing spread of English in the world as a worrying development (which lowers the status of local and regional languages as well as potentially undermining or eroding cultural values) are likely to be more receptive to Phillipson's views. Alastair Pennycook, Suresh Canagarajah, Adrian Holliday and Julian Edge fall into this group and are described as critical applied linguists.

However, Henry Widdowson’s remarks on critical discourse analysis may also be applied to the critical applied linguists:

It ought surely to be possible to say that an argument is confused, or an analysis flawed, without denying the justice of the cause they support. My view would be that if a case is just then we should look for ways of supporting it by coherent argument... And I would indeed argue that to do otherwise is to do a disservice to the cause. For the procedures of ideological exposure by expedient analysis... can, of course be taken up to further any cause, right wing as well as left.... If you have the conviction and commitment, you will always find your witch.

In Ireland, the issue of de-anglicising the influence of English has been a topic of debate in the country even before independence. An argument for de-anglicisation was delivered before the Irish National Literary Society in Dublin, 25 November 1892; "When we speak of 'The Necessity for De-Anglicising the Irish Nation', we mean it, not as a protest against imitating what is best in the English people, for that would be absurd, but rather to show the folly of neglecting what is Irish, and hastening to adopt, pell-mell, and indiscriminately, everything that is English, simply because it is English."

According to Ghil'ad Zuckermann, "Native tongue title and language rights should be promoted. The government ought to define Aboriginal and Torres Strait Islander vernaculars as official languages of Australia. We must change the linguistic landscape of Whyalla and elsewhere. Signs should be in both English and the local indigenous language. We ought to acknowledge intellectual property of indigenous knowledge including language, music and dance."

== Appropriation ==
Some who reject the idea of linguistic imperialism argue that the global spread of English is better understood in the framework of appropriation—that English is used around the world for local purposes. In addition to the example of Nigeria, other examples have been given:

- Demonstrators in non-English-speaking countries often use signs in English to convey their demands to TV audiences around the world. In some cases, demonstrators may not understand what their signs say.
- Bobda shows how Cameroon has moved away from a mono-cultural, Anglo-centered way of teaching English and has gradually accommodated teaching materials to a Cameroonian context. Non-Western topics are treated, such as rule by emirs, traditional medicine, and polygamy. Bobda argues for bi-cultural, Cameroonian and Anglo-American education.
- Kramsch and Sullivan describe how Western methodology and textbooks have been appropriated to suit local Vietnamese culture.
- Spowage adapts the idea of appropriation, suggesting that the spread of English is driven by local governments and political elites, rather than the use of English for grassroots purposes. She demonstrates this through a study of the growing importance of English in Rwanda, which she interprets as a strategy for establishing cultural hegemony. This leads Spowage to suggest an alternative to linguistic imperialism that features elements of the appropriation thesis, which she calls 'the global English nébuleuse'.
- The Pakistani textbook Primary Stage English includes lessons such as "Pakistan, My Country", "Our Flag," and "Our Great Leader", which might sound jingoistic to western ears. Within the native culture, however, establishing a connection between ELT, patriotism and the Muslim faith is seen as an aim of ELT, as the chairman of the Punjab Textbook Board openly states: "The board... takes care, through these books to inoculate in the students a love of the Islamic values and awareness to guard the ideological frontiers of your [the student's] home lands."

Such an "internationalization" of English may also offer new possibilities to English native-speakers. McCabe elaborates:

...whereas for two centuries we exported our language and our customs in hot pursuit of... fresh markets, we now find that our language and our customs are returned to us but altered so that they can be used by others... so that our own language and culture discover new possibilities, fresh contradictions.

== See also ==
- Anglicisation
- Colonialingualism
- Critical applied linguistics
- Cultural hegemony
- English as a second or foreign language
- Esperanto
- Glottopolitics
- International auxiliary language
- International English
- Language immersion
- Language policy
- Language planning
- Language revitalization
- Language death
- Linguistic purism
- Language secessionism
- Monolingualism
- Bilingualism
- Multilingualism
- Code-switching
- Translanguaging
- Official language
- Untranslatability
- World language
- Father Tongue hypothesis
- Latinx
