= Bernard Spolsky =

New Zealand linguist (1932–2022)

- Born: 11 February 1932; Wellington, New Zealand
- Died: 20 August 2022 (aged 90); Jerusalem, Israel
- Education: Victoria University, University of Montreal
- Spouse: Ellen Spolsky
- Children: Joel Spolsky, Ruthie Amaru
- Scientific career
- Fields: Linguistics

Bernard Spolsky (Hebrew: ברנרד ספולסקי; born in Wellington, New Zealand 11 February 1932; died in Jerusalem, Israel 20 August 2022) was a professor emeritus in linguistics at Bar-Ilan University (Israel), specializing in sociolinguistics, educational linguistics, and applied linguistics.

Born to a Jewish family in Wellington, New Zealand, Spolsky moved to Israel in 1958 after completing his studies at Wellington College and getting his degree at Victoria University. He received a Ph.D. in linguistics from the University of Montreal in 1966. After briefly serving in the Israel Defense Forces he taught at several North American universities such as McGill University, Indiana University, and the University of New Mexico. His large body of linguistic research encompasses bilingual education, language policy, and educational linguistics.

Spolsky's works are related to language testing, second language learning, computers in the humanities, applied linguistics, educational linguistics, sociolinguistics and language policy.
