= Linguistic Imperialism =

Book by Robert Phillipson

- Author: Robert Phillipson
- Subject: Philosophy, social sciences, language, education
- Published: 1992
- Publication place: United Kingdom
- Pages: 365
- ISBN: 0194371468
- OCLC: 30978070
- Followed by: Linguistic Imperialism Continued (2010)

Linguistic Imperialism is a book written by Robert Phillipson, research professor at Copenhagen Business School's Department of English, published in 1992 by Oxford University Press.

In Linguistic Imperialism, Phillipson argues that Western countries have used English as a tool of imperialism to dominate colonies and former colonies. He further explores the ideologies transmitted through the English language.

The book was followed by Linguistic Imperialism Continued, first published by Routledge in 2010.

== See also ==
- Cultural imperialism
- English as a lingua franca
- Hegemony
- Linguistic imperialism
