= Robert Phillipson =

British linguist

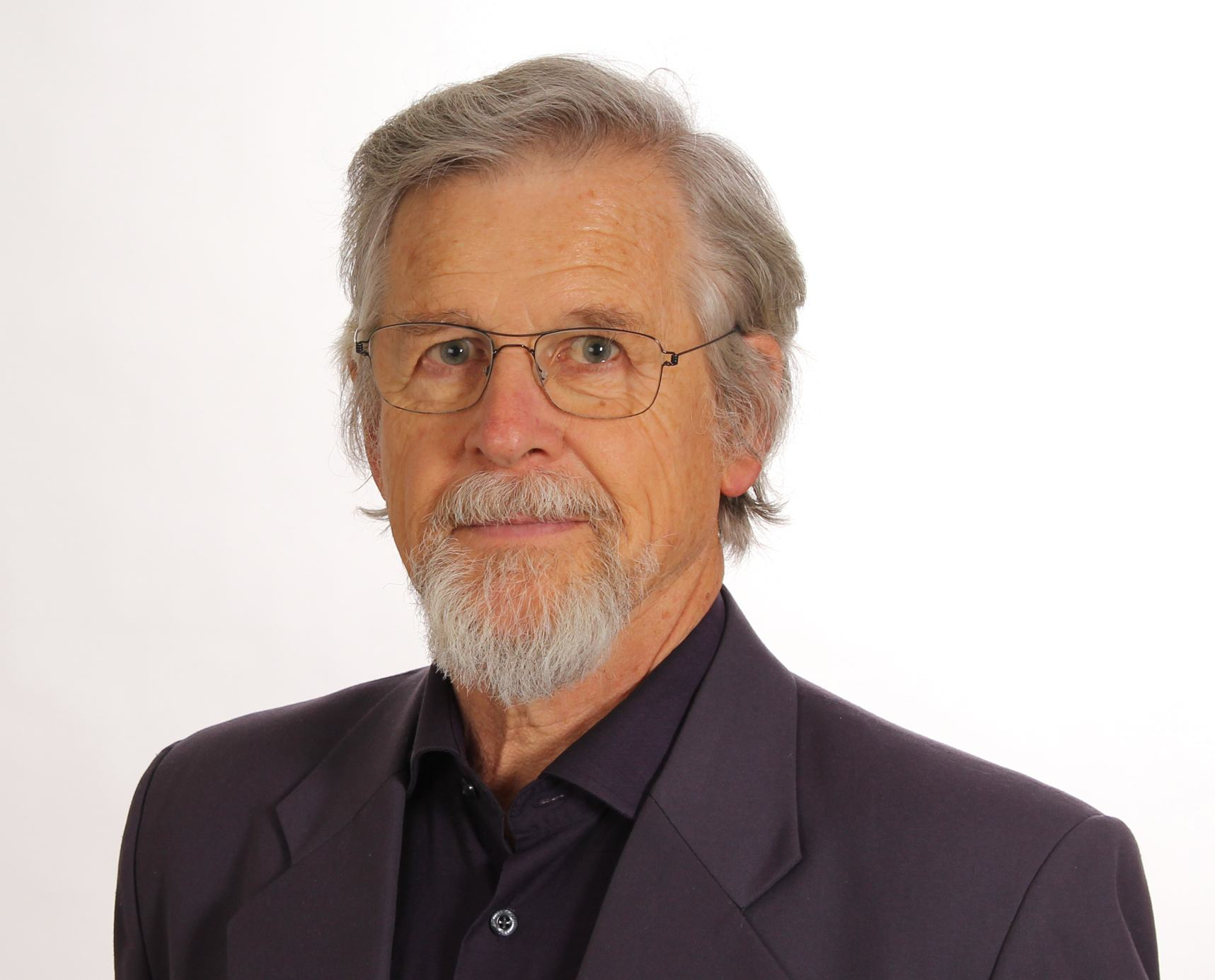
- Born: Robert Henry Lawrence Phillipson; March 18, 1942 (age 84); Gourock, Scotland
- Education: University of Amsterdam, Leeds University, University of Cambridge
- Occupation: Professor
- Employer: Copenhagen Business School
- Known for: Linguistic imperialism, linguistic discrimination, language ecology, language rights, language policy
- Spouse: Tove Skutnabb-Kangas
- Children: Caspar Phillipson, Thomas Phillipson, Louise Phillipson

Robert Henry Lawrence Phillipson (born 18 March 1942 in Gourock, Scotland) is Professor Emeritus in the Department of Management, Society and Communication at Copenhagen Business School in Denmark. He is best known for his seminal work on linguistic imperialism and language policy in Europe.

== Education and career ==
Phillipson was born in Scotland in 1942. He received his B.A. in 1964 and his M.A. in 1967, both in Modern Languages (French and German) and Law, from the University of Cambridge. He obtained his second M.A. in Linguistics and English Language Teaching from Leeds University in 1969. He earned his Ph.D., with distinction, in Education from the University of Amsterdam in 1990. He worked for the British Council from 1964 to 1973. He was associate professor in the Department of Languages and Culture at Roskilde University in Denmark from 1973 to 2000. He has been on the faculty of Copenhagen Business School since 2000. He also taught at the University of Copenhagen (1973-1984). He was Visiting Scholar at the Institute of Education at the University of London (1983), the University of Melbourne in Australia (1994), the Central Institute of Indian Languages in Mysore (1995), the University of Pecs in Hungary (1996) and the Center for Research in the Arts, Social Sciences and Humanities at the University of Cambridge (2005). He lived with his late wife, Tove Skutnabb-Kangas, in Sweden. He is the father of Danish actor Caspar Phillipson.

== Recognition ==
On 21 February 2010, Phillipson was awarded the Linguapax Prize along with Miquel Siguan i Soler. The Linguapax Institute describes them as "renowned advocates of multilingual education as a factor of peace and of linguistic rights against cultural and linguistic homogenization processes". Philipson also received the TESOL International Association's 2024 Presidential Award. The announcement letter stated: "A renowned scholar in the field of English language teaching, Dr. Phillipson has long been a proponent of building English language teaching into the fabric of local linguistic/cultural ecologies, developing supportive language policies to safeguard a sustainable balance between English and other languages, and advocating for linguistic human rights in cases where linguistic discrimination has occurred".

== Linguistic imperialism ==
In his 1992 book, Phillipson made the first serious and systematic attempt to theorize linguistic imperialism in relation to English language teaching. He offered the following working definition of English linguistic imperialism: “[T]he dominance of English is asserted and maintained by the establishment and continuous reconstitution of structural and cultural inequalities between English and other languages”. In his 1997 article, Phillipson defined linguistic imperialism as "a theoretical construct, devised to account for linguistic hierarchisation, to address issues of why some languages come to be used more and others less, what structures and ideologies facilitate such processes, and the role of language professionals". He recently listed seven constitutive traits of linguistic imperialism: (1) interlocking, (2) exploitative, (3) structural, (4) ideological, (5) hegemonic, (6) subtractive, and (7) unequal.

Linguistic imperialism interlocks with a structure of imperialism in culture, education, the media, communication, the economy, politics, and military activities. In essence it is about exploitation, injustice, inequality, and hierarchy that privileges those able to use the dominant language. It is structural: more material resources and infrastructure are accorded to the dominant language than to others. It is ideological: beliefs, attitudes, and imagery glorify the dominant language, stigmatize others, and rationalize the linguistic hierarchy. The dominance is hegemonic: it is internalized and naturalized as being “normal.” Proficiency in the imperial language and in learning it in education involves its consolidation at the expense of other languages: language use thereby serves subtractive purposes. This entails unequal rights for speakers of different languages.

From the theoretical perspective of linguistic imperialism, Phillipson problematized five fallacies of English language teaching: (1) the monolingual fallacy; (2) the native speaker fallacy; (3) the early start fallacy; (4) the maximum exposure fallacy; and (5) the subtractive fallacy. For the past three decades, he has continued to do research on linguistic imperialism. In the 2009 collection of his previously published essays, he explained the scope and significance of such research:

The study of linguistic imperialism focuses on how and why certain languages dominate internationally, and on attempts to account for such dominance in an explicit, theoretically founded way. Language is one of the most durable legacies of European colonial and imperial expansion. English, Spanish, and Portuguese are the dominant languages of the Americas. In Africa, the languages of some of the colonizing powers, England, France, and Portugal are more firmly entrenched than ever, as English is in several Asian countries. The study of linguistic imperialism can help to clarify whether the winning of political independence led to a linguistic liberation of Third World countries, and if not, why not.

== Books ==
- Phillipson, R. (1992). Linguistic imperialism. Oxford University Press.
- Phillipson, R. (Ed.). (2000). Rights to language: Equity, power and education. Lawrence Erlbaum Associates.
- Phillipson, R. (Ed.). (2003). English-only Europe? Challenging language policy. Routledge.
- Phillipson, R. (2009). Linguistic imperialism continued. Orient Blackswan.
- Skutnabb-Kangas, T., & Phillipson, R. (Eds.). (1994). Linguistic human rights: Overcoming linguistic discrimination. Mouton de Gruyter.
- Skutnabb-Kangas, T., & Phillipson, R. (Eds.). (2017). Language rights. Routledge.
- Skutnabb-Kangas, T., & Phillipson, R. (Eds.). (2023). The handbook of linguistic human rights. John Wiley & Sons.

== Articles ==
- Phillipson, R. (1997). Realities and myths of linguistic imperialism. Journal of Multilingual and Multicultural Development, 18(3), 238–248.
- Phillipson, R. (1998). Globalizing English: Are linguistic human rights an alternative to linguistic imperialism? Language Sciences, 20(1), 101–112.
- Phillipson, R. (2001). English for globalization or for the world's people? International Review of Education, 47(3), 185–200.
- Phillipson, R. (2002). Global English and local language policies. In A. Kirkpatrick (Ed.), Englishes in Asia: Communication, identity, power and education (pp. 7–28). Melbourne, Australia: Language Australia.
- Phillipson, R. (2008). The linguistic imperialism of neoliberal empire. Critical Inquiry in Language Studies, 5(1), 1–43.
- Phillipson, R. (2017). Myths and realities of "global" English. Language Policy, 16(3), 313–331.
- Phillipson, R. (2022). A personal narrative of multilingual evolution. In R. Sachdeva & R. K. Agnihotri (Eds.), Being and becoming multilingual: Some narratives (pp. 63–83). Orient Blackswan.
- Phillipson, R., & Skutnabb-Kangas, T. (1996). English only worldwide or language ecology? TESOL Quarterly, 30(3), 429–452.
- Phillipson, R., & Skutnabb-Kangas, T. (2017). Linguistic imperialism and the consequences for language ecology. In A. F. Fill & H. Penz (Eds.), The Routledge handbook of ecolinguistics (pp. 121–134). Routledge.
- Phillipson, R., & Skutnabb-Kangas, T. (2022). Communicating in "global" English: Promoting linguistic human rights or complicit with linguicism and linguistic imperialism. In Y. Miike & J. Yin (Eds.), The handbook of global interventions in communication theory (pp. 425–439). Routledge.

== See also ==
- Critical applied linguistics
- English as a second or foreign language
- International English
- Language death
- Linguistic discrimination
- Language planning
- Language policy
- Linguistic imperialism
- Language rights
- Multilingualism
- World Englishes
