= Language policy =

Body of practices intended to cause a desired change in language

Language policy is both an interdisciplinary academic field and implementation of ideas about language use. Some scholars such as Joshua Fishman and Ofelia García consider it as part of sociolinguistics. On the other hand, other scholars such as Bernard Spolsky, Robert B. Kaplan and Joseph Lo Bianco argue that language policy is a branch of applied linguistics.

As a field, language policy is also known as language planning or language policy and planning, and is related to other fields such as language ideology, language revitalization, and language education, among others.

== Definitions ==
Language policy has been defined in a number of ways. According to Kaplan and Baldauf (1997), "A language policy is a body of ideas, laws, regulations, rules and practices intended to achieve the planned language change in the societies, group or system" (p. xi). Lo Bianco defines the field as "a situated activity, whose specific history and local circumstances influence what is regarded as a language problem, and whose political dynamics determine which language problems are given policy treatment” (p. 152). McCarty (2011) defines language policy as "a complex sociocultural process [and as] modes of human interaction, negotiation, and production mediated by relations of power. The 'policy' in these processes resides in their language-regulating power; that is, the ways in which they express normative claims about legitimate and illegitimate language forms and uses, thereby governing language statuses and uses" (p. 8).

== Overview ==
Language policy is broad, but it can be categorized into three components. Spolsky (2004) argues, "A useful first step is to distinguish between the three components of the language policy of a speech community: (1) its language practices – the habitual pattern of selecting among the varieties that make up its linguistic repertoire; (2) its language beliefs or ideology – the beliefs about language and language use; and (3) any specific efforts to modify or influence that practice by any kind of language intervention, planning, or management" (p. 5).

The traditional scope of language policy concerns language regulation. This refers to what a government does either officially through legislation, court decisions or policy to determine how languages are used, cultivate language skills needed to meet national priorities or to establish the rights of individuals or groups to use and maintain languages.

== Implementation ==
The implementation of language policy varies from one state to another. This may be explained by the fact that language policy is often based on contingent historical reasons. Likewise, states also differ as to the degree of explicitness with which they implement a given language policy. The French Toubon law provides a good example of explicit language policy. The same may be said for the Charter of the French Language in Quebec.

Scholars such as Tollefson argue that language policy can create inequality:

"language planning-policy means the institutionalization of language as a basis for distinctions among social groups (classes). That is, language policy is one mechanism for locating language within social structure so that language determines who has access to political power and economic resources. Language policy is one mechanism by which dominant groups establish hegemony in language use" (p. 16).

Many countries have a language policy designed to favor or discourage the use of a particular language or set of languages. States, local authorities or pressure-groups can promote bilingual signage or can agitate for translations of newspaper articles. Although nations historically have used language policies most often to promote one official language at the expense of others, many countries now have policies designed to protect and promote regional and ethnic languages whose viability is threatened. Indeed, whilst the existence of linguistic minorities within a jurisdiction has often been considered to be a potential threat to internal cohesion, states also understand that providing language rights to minorities may be more in their long-term interest, as a means of gaining citizens' trust in the central government.

The preservation of cultural and linguistic diversity in today's world is a major concern to many scientists, artists, writers, politicians, leaders of linguistic communities, and defenders of linguistic human rights. More than half of the 6000 languages currently spoken in the world are estimated to be in danger of disappearing during the 21st century. Many factors affect the existence and usage of any given human language, including the size of the population of native speakers, its use in formal communication, and the geographical dispersion and the socio-economic weight of its speakers. National language policies can either mitigate or exacerbate the effects of some of these factors.

For example, according to Ghil'ad Zuckermann:

"Native tongue title and language rights should be promoted. The government ought to define Aboriginal and Torres Strait Islander vernaculars as official languages of Australia. We must change the linguistic landscape of Whyalla and elsewhere. Signs should be in both English and the local indigenous language. We ought to acknowledge intellectual property of indigenous knowledge including language, music and dance."

There are many ways in which language policies can be categorized. Université Laval sociolinguist Jacques Leclerc elaborated the field for the French-language web site L'aménagement linguistique dans le monde (put on line by the CIRAL in 1999). The collecting, translating and classifying of language policies started in 1988 and culminated in the publishing of Recueil des législations linguistiques dans le monde (vol. I to VI) at Presses de l'Université Laval in 1994. The work, containing some 470 language-laws, and the research leading to publication, were subsidised by the Office québécois de la langue française. In April 2008, the web site presented the linguistic portrait and language policies in 354 States or autonomous territories in 194 recognised countries.

== Language regulators ==
- List of language regulators
- Académie française
- The Academy of the Hebrew Language
- Akademio de Esperanto
- Association of Spanish Language Academies
- Árni Magnússon Institute for Icelandic Studies
- Board for Standardization of the Serbian Language (Serbia, Montenegro, Republika Srpska)
- Bòrd na Gàidhlig (Gaelic in Scotland)
- Commission on the Filipino Language (Philippines)
- Dewan Bahasa dan Pustaka (Malaysia)
- Dutch Language Union
- Foras na Gaeilge (Irish)
- Institut d'Estudis Catalans
- Badan Pengembangan Bahasa dan Perbukuan (Indonesia)
- Norwegian Language Council
- Office québécois de la langue française
- Ofis Publik ar Brezhoneg (Breton in Brittany)
- Pan South African Language Board
- Real Academia Española
- State Language Commission (China)
- Swedish Language Council
- Welsh Language Commissioner

== See also ==
- Linguistic diversity
- Linguistic rights
- Cultural hegemony
- Directorate of Language Planning and Implementation
- Economics of language
- Grimm's law
- Language change
- Language movement
- Language planning
- Language politics
- Language reform
- Language revitalization
- Language death
- Cross-border language
- National language
- Native Tongue Title
- Official language
- Official script
- Regional language
- Street name controversy
- International Mother Language Day
- International Year of Languages (2008)
- Languages in censuses

Directions of language policies:

- Colonialingualism
- Linguistic imperialism
- Linguistic purism
- Language secessionism

Some case studies:

- Europe: European Charter for Regional or Minority Languages
- Belgium: Language legislation in Belgium
- Croatia: Croatian linguistic purism
- Finland: Finland's language strife
- France: Language policy in France
- Germany: Germanization
- Hungary: Magyarization
- Italy: Italianization
- Latvia: Language policy in Latvia
- Poland: Polonization
- Russia and Soviet Union: Russification, Education in the Soviet Union
- Slovakia: Language law of Slovakia, Slovakization
- Spain: Language policies of Francoist Spain
- Ukraine: Ukrainization
- Wales: Welsh Not
- Arab world: Arabization
- Bangladesh: Bengali language movement
- Canada: Official bilingualism in Canada, Official Languages Act (Canada)
- India: Anti-Hindi agitations of Tamil Nadu
- Pakistan: Urdu movement
- United States: English-only movement

== Bibliography ==
- Tollefson, J. W. (1991). Planning language, planning inequality: Language policy in the community. London: Longman.
- Spolsky, B. (2004). Language policy. Cambridge: Cambridge University Press.
- Spolsky, B. (2009). Language management. Cambridge: Cambridge University Press.
- Johnson, D. C. (2013). Language policy. London: Palgrave MacMillan.
- Cooper, R. L. (1989). Language planning and social change. Cambridge: Cambridge University Press.
- Zein, S. (2020). Language policy in superdiverse Indonesia. New York and London: Routledge.
- Ginsburgh, V., Weber, S. (Eds.). (2016). The Palgrave Handbook of Economics and Language. London: Palgrave Macmillan.
- Michele Gazzola, Torsten Templin, Bengt-Arne Wickström, (2018), Language Policy and Linguistic Justice, Springer.
- Shohamy, Elana (2006). Language Policy: Hidden Agendas and New Approaches. London: Routledge.
- Hult, F.M., & Johnson, D.C. (Eds.) (2015). Research Methods in Language Policy and Planning: A Practical Guide. Malden, MA: Wiley-Blackwell ISBN 978-1-118-30838-7.
- Crawford, James (2000). Language Policy Website.
- Bastardas-Boada, Albert (2012). Language and identity policies in the 'glocal' age. Barcelona: Institut d'Estudis Autonòmics.
- Bastardas-Boada, Albert (2013). Language policy and planning as an interdisciplinary field: Towards a complexity approach, Current Issues in Language Planning, Volume 14, 2013 - Issue 3-04.
- Bastardas-Boada, Albert (2019). From language shift to language revitalization and sustainability. A complexity approach to linguistic ecology. Barcelona: Edicions de la Universitat de Barcelona. ISBN 978-84-9168-316-2.
- Kadochnikov, D. (2016). Languages, Regional Conflicts and Economic Development: Russia. In: Ginsburgh, V., Weber, S. (Eds.). The Palgrave Handbook of Economics and Language. London: Palgrave Macmillan. 2016. pp. 538–580.
- Spolsky, Bernard (2012). The Cambridge Handbook of Language Policy. Cambridge University Press.
- Silva, Diego B. (2019). Language policy in Oceania. Alfa, Rev. Linguíst. 63 (2).
- Zuckermann, Ghil'ad and Walsh, Michael 2011.'Stop, Revive, Survive: Lessons from the Hebrew Revival Applicable to the Reclamation, Maintenance and Empowerment of Aboriginal Languages and Cultures', Australian Journal of Linguistics 31.
