= Alastair Pennycook =

English academic

Alastair Pennycook FAHA is an Australian applied linguist. He is Emeritus Professor of Language, Society and Education at the University of Technology Sydney, and a Research Professor at the Centre for Multilingualism in Society Across the Lifespan at the University of Oslo. He was elected a fellow of the Australian Academy of the Humanities in 2016.

Alastair Pennycook is an internationally renowned applied linguist known for his work in four principal areas: Critical analysis of the global spread of English, critical applied linguistics, critical philosophy of language, and studies of popular culture and urban multilingualism. Four of his books have been awarded the BAAL Book Prize. Several key themes unite this diverse body of work: an insistence on understanding the politics of language, the ways in which language use is always bound up with questions of social power; the need to explore what language and languages are rather than accepting the ways they are described in orthodox linguistics; and the importance of understanding things locally, of seeing how things operate in their particular environments.

== Books ==
- Pennycook, Alastair (1994). The Cultural Politics Of English As An International Language. Routledge. ISBN 9780582234727.
- Pennycook, Alastair (1998). English and the Discourses of Colonialism. Routledge. ISBN 9780415178488.
- Pennycook, Alastair (2001). Critical Applied Linguistics: A Critical Introduction. Routledge. ISBN 9780805837926.
- Makoni, Sinfree; Pennycook, Alastair, eds. (2007). Disinventing and Reconstituting Languages. Multilingual Matters. ISBN 9781853599231.
- Pennycook, Alastair (2007). Global Englishes and Transcultural Flows. Routledge. ISBN 9780415374972.
- Pennycook, Alastair (2010). Language as a Local Practice. Routledge. ISBN 9780415547512.
- Pennycook, Alastair (2012). Language and Mobility: Unexpected Places. Multilingual Matters. ISBN 9781847697646.
- Pennycook, Alastair; Otsuji, Emi (2015). Metrolingualism: Language in the City. Routledge. ISBN 9780415831659.
- Pennycook, Alastair (2017). Posthumanist Applied Linguistics. Routledge. ISBN 9781138209220.
- Dovchin, Sender; Pennycook, Alastair; Sultana, Shaila (2018). Popular culture, voice and linguistic diversity: Young adults on- and offline. Palgrave MacMillan. ISBN 9783319619552.
- Pennycook, Alastair; Makoni, Sinfree (2020). Innovations and Challenges in Applied Linguistics from the Global South. Routledge. ISBN 9780429951756.
- Pennycook, Alastair (2024). Language assemblages. Cambridge University Press.
