= Etymology of Belarus =

Origin of the name Belarus

The name Belarus (Беларусь, Biełaruś) can be literally translated as White Ruthenia (Белая Русь, Biełaja Ruś).

According to one version the old Rus' lands that were not conquered by the Tatars (i.e., Polack, Viciebsk and Mahiloŭ) had been referred to as "White Rus". White in this case means independent, free (A. Potebnja, M. Lyubavsky, M. Doŭnar-Zapolski).

Another version suggests that the name comes from the white color of the hair or clothing of the inhabitants of these lands (V. Tatishchev, Max Vasmer, Jaŭchim Karski). Modern researchers find this dubious.

The third version suggests that "White Rus" was the name given to the lands whose population was Christian, as opposed to Black Rus', where paganism allegedly persisted for a long time.

The fourth version is based on the fact that White means great or ancient (N. Karamzin), and the names of the most ancient states among the Croats are constructed accordingly - White Croatia, and among the Serbs - White Serbia.

== Etymological development ==
Rus' is generally considered to be a borrowing from Finnic Ruotsi ("Sweden"). There are two theories behind the origin of Rus'/Ruotsi, which are not mutually exclusive. It is either derived more directly from OEN rōþer (OWN róðr), which referred to rowing, the fleet levy, etc., or it is derived from this term through Rōþin, an older name for the Swedish coastal region Roslagen.

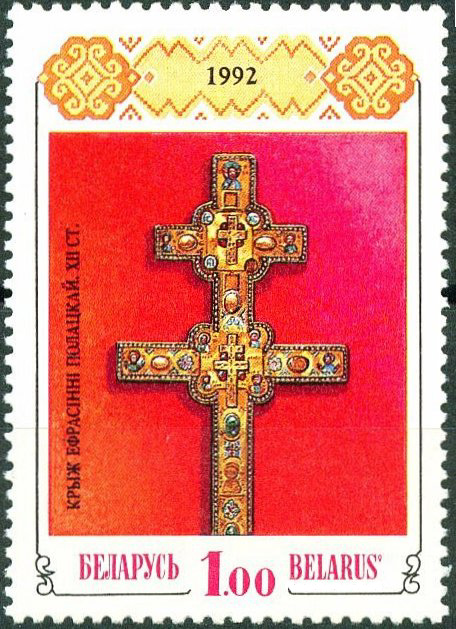
Stamp with the Cross of St. Euphrosyne from 1992

The name Rus' is often conflated with its Latin forms Ruthenia and Russia, that is why Belarus is sometimes mistakenly called White Russia.

The name first appeared in German and Latin medieval literature; the chronicles of Jan of Czarnków mention the imprisonment of Lithuanian grand duke Jogaila and his mother at "Albae Russiae, Poloczk dicto" in 1381.

Before the Mongol invasions, the name White Rus' was used for the Duchy of Rostov-Suzdal or Novgorod, but later the name shifted to the Duchies of Vitebsk and Polotsk. In the early 16th century, the Polish geographer Jan of Stobnica expanded the meaning of the term to mean all the Rus' lands under the Grand Duchy of Lithuania.

The Latin term "Alba Russia" (White Ruthenia) was used again by Pope Pius VI in 1783 to recognize the Society of Jesus there, exclaiming "Approbo Societatem Jesu in Alba Russia degentem, approbo, approbo."

During the 17th century, the Russian tsars used "White Rus" to describe the lands of the Grand Duchy of Lithuania.

The Russian imperial (and then Soviet) term Byelorussia (Russian: Белору́ссия, Belorussiya, literally “White Russia”) was coined in the 18th–19th centuries, and the Russian Tsar was usually styled "the Tsar of All the Russias", as Russia or the Russian Empire was formed by three parts of Russia—the Great, Little, and White. That usage implied Belarusian lands were simply part of "all Russia," that all the peoples on those territories, including the Belarusians, were "just Russian," subsuming local identity.

Officially, the full name of the state of Belarus is "Republic of Belarus" (Рэспубліка Беларусь, Respublika Biełaruś, Respublika Belarus, Республика Беларусь).

== Name for the Belarusian state ==
After the Bolshevik Revolution in 1917, the term "White Russia" caused some confusion, as the name of the military force that opposed the red Bolsheviks was called "White Russians" or "the Whites".

In 1918 Belarusians briefly established the Belarusian People’s Republic (White Ruthenian Democratic Republic) (in the chaos after World War I). Soon after, much of Belarus became the Byelorussian SSR, a republic of the USSR (1920s–1991). The Soviet name Byelorussian (Belorussian) was derived from the Russian “Belorussiya,” again meaning “White Russia,” and was imposed in official use.

Belarusian intelligentsia in the Stalin era attempted to change the name from Byelorussia to a form of Kryvia/Krivia (the name connected with the ancient Belarusian tribe of Kryvichs) because of the connection with Russia. But, as a result, Byelorussia gave rise to the contemporary names used for the SSR in English and other languages.

Importantly, the people of Belarus themselves continued to use Biełaruś (Belarus) and Biełaja Ruś (White Rus’) in their language as for centuries before.

In 1991 after the dissolution of the Soviet Union, the Supreme Soviet of Belarus, a continuation of that of the previous Byelorussian SSR, moved to change the republic's name to the Republic of Belarus (Республика Беларусь spelled in Russian), which has the abridged form "Belarus". The law decreed that all the forms of the new term be transliterated into other languages from their Belarusian language forms, and the use of the name of Byelorussian SSR and any abbreviations thereof be phased out before the end of 1993. Conservative forces in the newly independent Belarus did not support the name change and opposed its inclusion in the 1991 draft of the Constitution of Belarus. Due to the 1991 decree, the name Byelorussia was superseded by Belarus in English, and the adjective Belorussian or Byelorussian by Belarusan, which sounds like population's historical name of Ruthene.

In 1995, the regime of Alexander Lukashenko, pushed for the more Russia-like adjective form of Belarusian. Some nationalists object to the name for the same reason.

== Names of Belarus in different languages ==
Nowadays the name "Belarus" is more popular than “Belorussia” in Russia, but the term “Belorussia” continues to be used sometimes, and the term Belorussia is still common among groups that wish for Belarus to be annexed by Russia.

In some languages Belarus is often still referred to by a literal translation of "White Russia", including Dutch, Afrikaans (both Wit-Rusland), and German (Weißrussland). However, speakers of those languages in some countries, such as the Netherlands, Germany and Denmark, have been observed to increasingly favor forms resembling Belarus. As a result, Sweden began to call the country Belarus in 2019, Germany - in 2020, Denmark - in 2021. On May 29, 2022, the Norwegian authorities changed the name of Hviterussland to Belarus.

On 16 March 2018, the Embassy of Belarus in Beijing requested the use of Báilúosī (白罗斯; 白羅斯) (literally "White Rus") for the Chinese language, although Báiélúosī (白俄罗斯; 白俄羅斯) is still common, which means literally "White Russia".

In Lithuanian, besides the name “Baltarusija” (White Russia), Belarus is also being called “Gudija”.

Gudija is derived from gudai (singular gudas), an old Lithuanian name for Belarusians. In the 16th century Mikalojus Daukša used it for the Slavic population of the Grand Duchy of Lithuania. According to the historian Edvardas Gudavičius, from the 17th century the name was applied mostly to Belarusians and from the second half of the 19th century only to them. It was officially replaced by baltarusiai in the late 1940s, but since the early 1990s it has often been used as a traditional name. The name was not always tied to a single people: Prussian Lithuanians called all their southern neighbours gudai, whether they were Poles, Lithuanians or Belarusians.

The traditional etymology, going back to Kazimieras Būga, derives gudai from the name of the Goths: the Western Balts are thought to have called their Gothic neighbours by this name, which later passed to the Slavs. It was supported by Ernst Fraenkel and Zigmas Zinkevičius, and Oleg Trubachyov saw in it a ready name for the Goths that the Lithuanians reapplied to their southern neighbours, the Slavs. Other scholars reject the link. Simas Karaliūnas considered gotas and gudas etymologically unrelated, and Alvydas Butkus and Stefano Lanza argue that the phonetic correspondences rule out connecting the Gothi of Latin texts with the gudai. Alternative proposals connect the name with a Baltic word for 'wood' (Old Prussian gudde) or with the Yotvingians.

== Bibliography ==
- Thomas M. Bohn (2025). Weißrussland oder Belarus? Die Weiße Ruß in Historiographie und Kartographie. Harassowitz, Wiesbaden 2025, ISBN 978-3-447-12380-8.
- de Courson, Barbara Frances Mary (1879). The Jesuits: their foundation and history, Volume 1. Benziger Brothers.
- Minahan, James (1998). Miniature Empires: A Historical Dictionary of the Newly Independent States. Greenwood. ISBN 0-313-30610-9.
- Levy, Patricia; Spilling, Michael (2009). Belarus. New York: Benchmark Books. ISBN 978-0-7614-3411-5.
- Plokhy, Serhii (2001). The Cossacks and Religion in Early Modern Ukraine. Oxford University Press. ISBN 0-19-924739-0.
- Richmond, Yale (1995). From Da to Yes: Understanding the East Europeans. Intercultural Press. ISBN 1-877864-30-7.
- Ryder, Andrew (1998). Eastern Europe and the Commonwealth of Independent States. Routledge. ISBN 1-85743-058-1.
- Vauchez, André; Dobson, Richard Barrie; Lapidge, Michael (2001). Encyclopedia of the Middle Ages. Routledge. ISBN 1-57958-282-6.
- Treadgold, Donald; Ellison, Herbert J. (1999). Twentieth Century Russia. Westview Press. ISBN 0-8133-3672-4.
- Zaprudnik, Jan (1993). Belarus: At a Crossroads in History. Westview Press. ISBN 0-8133-1794-0. Archived from the original on 2 May 2016.
