= Tove Skutnabb-Kangas =

Finnish linguist and educator (1940–2023)

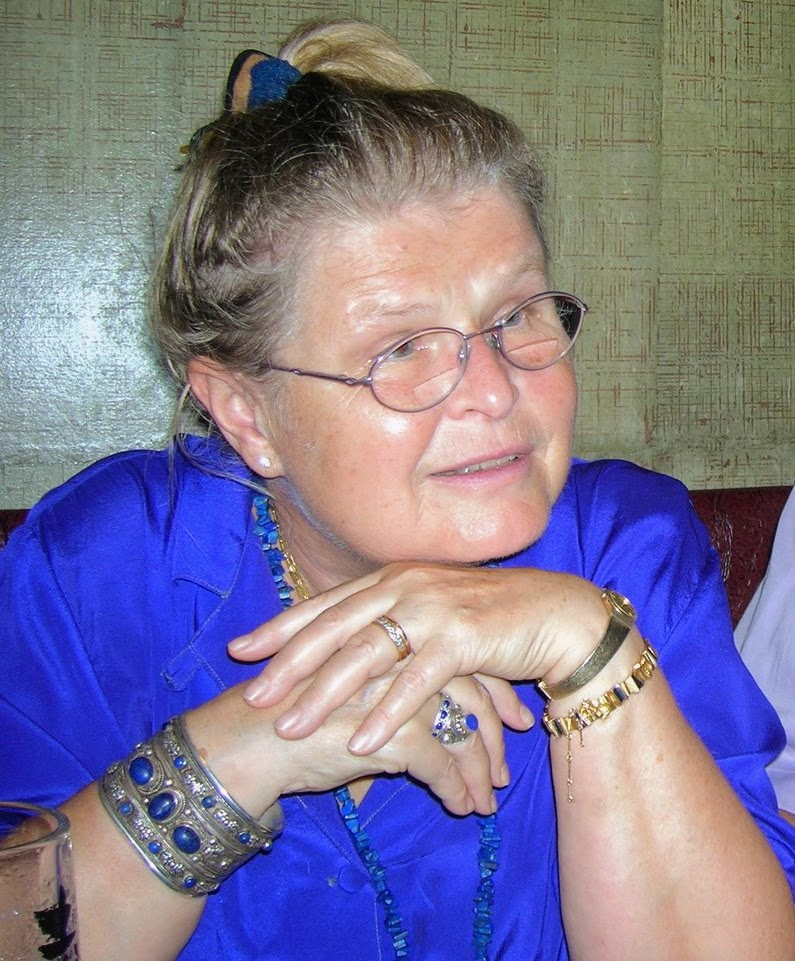
- Born: Tove Anita Skutnabb-Kangas; 6 July 1940; Helsinki, Finland
- Died: 29 May 2023 (aged 82); Lund, Sweden
- Known for: Linguicism
- Spouse: Robert Phillipson

Academic background
- Education: University of Helsinki (BA, MA, PhD); Roskilde University (PhD)

Academic work
- Discipline: Linguist
- Sub-discipline: Multilingualism, linguistic rights
- Institutions: University of Helsinki; Roskilde University

Tove Anita Skutnabb-Kangas (6 July 1940 – 29 May 2023) was a Finnish linguist and educator. She is known for coining the term linguicism to refer to discrimination based on language.

== Life ==
Skutnabb-Kangas was born in Helsinki, Finland, and her mother tongues were Finnish and Swedish. After studying at single sex schools in Helsinki, she worked for a short time at the teacher training college. In 1967 and 1968, she was in the United States, where she worked for Einar Haugen at the Department of Nordic Languages at Harvard. After that she worked briefly as a teacher in Helsinki. From 1970, she worked as a scientist at universities in Finland and Denmark. In 1976, she obtained her first doctorate in Helsinki; The subject of her doctorate was bilingualism. From 1995 to 2000, she taught at Roskilde University, where she was a guest researcher from 1979 to 2007. From then until her death, she was emeritus.

At the beginning of the 1980s, she developed the concept of linguicism, with which she summarized the discrimination of minority languages. She criticized the neglect of children who speak mother tongues that are foreign to the country where they live (for example Turkish children in Germany) as well as the devaluation of bilingualism. Kangas defined linguicism as the "ideologies and structures which are used to legitimate, effectuate, and reproduce unequal division of power and resources (both material and non-material) between groups which are defined on the basis of language".

In 2000, a book was published with the title Rights to language: equity, power and education; celebrating the 60th birthday of Tove Skutnabb-Kangas by her husband British linguist Robert Phillipson.

She was the stepmother of Danish actor Caspar Phillipson.

In 2003, she and Aina Moll won the Linguapax Prize, awarded by Linguapax International.

Skutnabb-Kangas died in Sjöberga, Sweden on 29 May 2023, at the age of 82.

== Works ==
- Bilingualism or not - the education of minorities. Multilingual Matters. 1981. ISBN 0-905028-17-1.
- Minority education: from shame to struggle. Multilingual Matters. 1988. ISBN 1853590037.
- Language, Literacy and Minorities. The Minority Rights Group. 1990. ISBN 0946690782.
- Linguistic Human Rights. Over-coming linguistic discrimination. Contributions to the Sociology of Language 67. Mouton de Gruyter. 1994. ISBN 3-11-014878-1. (478 pages, Paperback).
- Multilingualism for All. Series European Studies on Multilingualism. Swets & Zeitlinger. January 1995. ISBN 90-265-1423-9.
- Language: A Right and a Resource. Approaching Linguistic Human Rights. Central European University Press. January 1999. ISBN 963-9116-64-5.
- Linguistic genocide in education ? or worldwide diversity and human rights?. Lawrence Erlbaum Associates. 2000. ISBN 0-8058-3468-0.

== Bibliography ==
- Rights to Language: Equity, Power, and Education. Celebrating the 60th Birthday of Tove Skutnabb-Kangas. Lawrence Erlbaum Associates.
