= Sender Dovchin =

Australian professor of linguistics

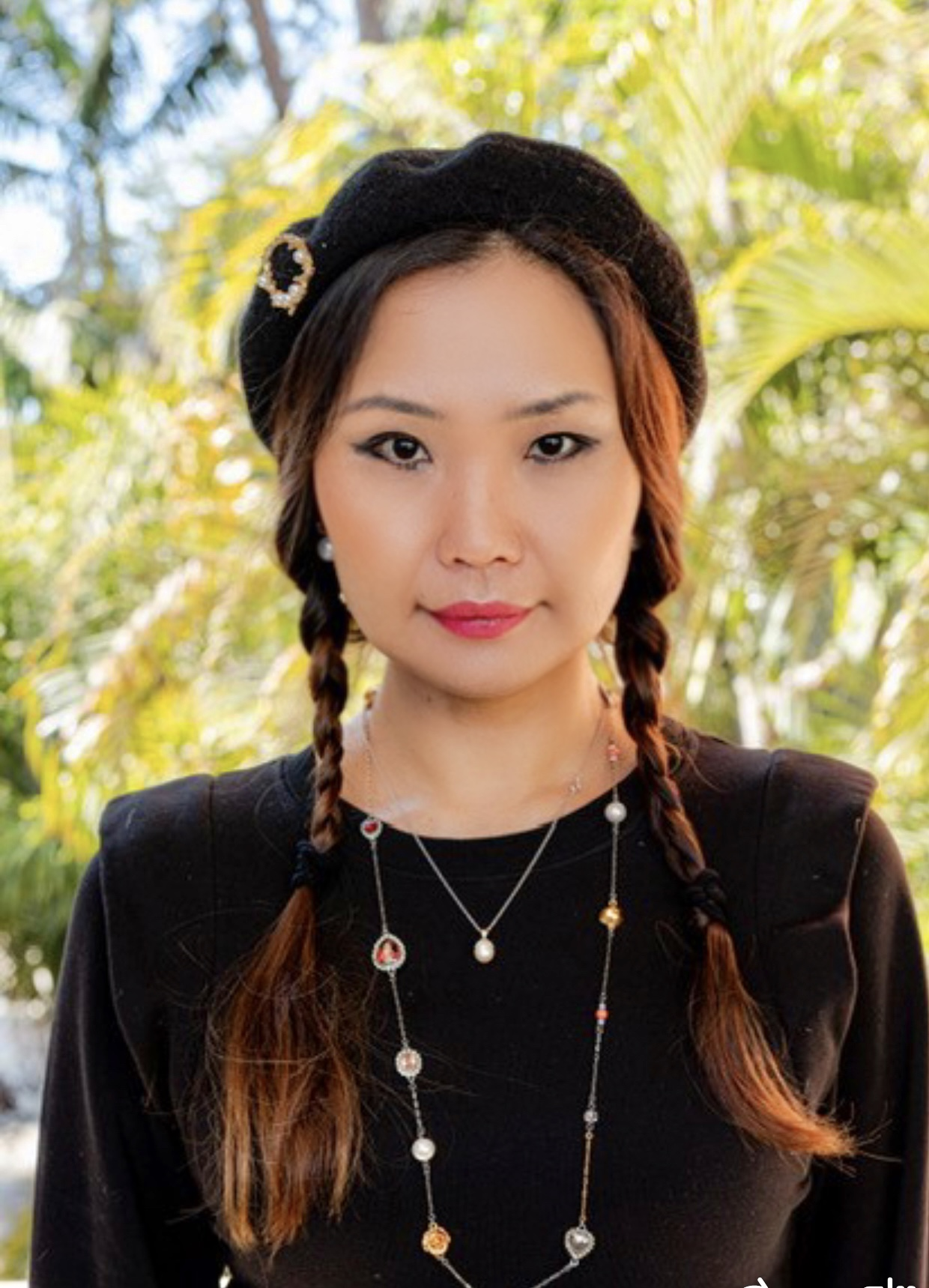
- Occupations: Professor, linguist and author
- Years active: 2016–present
- Title: Dean International
- Term: 2025-2026

Academic background
- Education: University of Technology Sydney (MA, DPhil)
- Thesis: The linguascape of urban youth culture in Mongolia (2014)

Sender Dovchin is an Australian linguist and academic. She is the Dean International at Curtin University, as well as a professor and Australian Research Council Fellow at the School of Education, Curtin University, in Perth, Western Australia. Her research focuses on sociolinguistics, applied linguistics, and language education, with a particular emphasis on translingualism and linguistic diversity.

== Career ==
Dovchin earned her Ph.D. and M.A. in language education from the University of Technology Sydney.

Prior to her current role, she served as an associate professor at the Centre for Language Research, University of Aizu, Japan, where she received the Young Scientist award from the Japan Society for the Promotion of Science. Dovchin's research explores how language users employ translingualism playfully, while negotiating precarious situations such as breaking social norms and subverting sociolinguistic boundaries. She has authored numerous publications in scientific journals and has published six books.

She serves as the editor-in-chief of the Australian Review of Applied Linguistics and has secured multiple research grants as both lead and co-investigator. Dovchin's Australian Research Council DECRA project focuses on empowering vulnerable youth in Australia by combating linguistic racism, exploring how culturally diverse young Australians face discrimination due to their speech.

Dovchin has also undertaken research into language diversity and education in multicultural contexts, including research into the impact of using non-English names on job applications.

== Publications ==
- Dovchin, Sender; Pennycook, Alastair; Sultana, Shaila (2017). Popular Culture, Voice and Linguistic Diversity. New York, NY: Palgrave Macmillan. ISBN 978-3-319-61954-5.
- Dovchin, Sender (2018). Language, Media and Globalization in the Periphery. New York: Routledge. ISBN 978-1-138-05167-6.
- Dovchin, Sender (2019). Language, Social Media and Ideologies. Cham, Switzerland: Springer. ISBN 978-3-030-26138-2.
- Translingual Discrimination (November 2022)
- Translingual Practices: Playfulness and Precariousness (May 2024)

== Awards and recognitions ==
- Young Scientist Award
- Top Researcher in Language & Linguistics
- Top 250 Researchers in Australia
