= Joseph Lo Bianco =

Australian language academic

Professor Joseph Lo Bianco AM FAHA
- Born: 7 July 1953 (age 72)
- Organization(s): Melbourne Graduate School of Education, University of Melbourne
- Known for: Language Policy, Language Planning, Linguistics, Literacy, Multilingualism
- Notable work: The National Policy on Languages (1987)

Joseph Lo Bianco AM FAHA (born 7 July 1953) is Professor of Language and Literacy Education at the Melbourne Graduate School of Education, University of Melbourne, and serves as past president of the Australian Academy of the Humanities (the first educator elected to this role). From 2011–2017 he designed, led and implemented a 6-year, 3-country language and peace building initiative for UNICEF in Malaysia, Myanmar and Thailand. He has previously worked on peace building activities in Sri Lanka in the late 1990s, and in several other settings. He is a language planning specialist, recognised for his work on combining practical problem solving language policy with academic study of language problems. He has published extensively on bilingual education, English as a second/additional language, peace building and communication, multiculturalism and intercultural education, Asian studies, Italian language teaching and the revitalisation of indigenous and immigrant community languages.

== Biography ==
Professor Lo Bianco wrote Australia's National Policy on Languages in 1987, the first multilingual national language policy in an English speaking country and was chief executive of the National Languages and Literacy Institute of Australia until 2002.

He has advised on language, culture and literacy education, and on the integration of indigenous and immigrant children into mainstream schools, reconciliation and peace through education, in many countries, including Canada, Ireland, Italy, Papua New Guinea, Singapore, Slovenia, South Africa, Sri Lanka, Thailand, Timor Leste, the United Kingdom, and Vietnam, among others.

From 2011–2017 he served as research advisor for LUCIDE, a European Commission project on Languages in Urban Communities – Integration and Diversity for Europe, conducting large scale 4-year research on multilingualism at the municipal level in 12 European cities.

In January 2014 he commenced in an academic advisory role with the National Research Centre for Foreign Language Education at Beijing Foreign Studies University which has included providing advice to the State Language Commission of China and supporting academic research initiatives.

Professor Lo Bianco supervises PhD research projects and teaches courses in language planning, and supports international research projects in several countries on language and culture studies, language planning and multiculturalism/intercultural education. His language policy advising activity includes: language services for the Sydney Olympic Games, a report which was subsequently used to support planning of language services at the Athens and London Games; assistance to the government of Ireland to produce a 20-year strategy to support the vitality of Irish; support on basic education, literacy and language policy in South Africa, Hawaii, Italy, Alberta (Canada), Western Samoa and other Pacific Island countries; preparation of a National Language Education plan for the Government of Sri Lanka, 1999, under World Bank financing; and commissioned support for language policy in Scotland and Northern Ireland, among other international collaboration activities.

== National Policy on Languages ==
The National Policy on Languages (NPL) was issued by the Australian Government Publishing Service (AGPS) in March 1987. It was the first comprehensive national language policy in Australia. On 26 April 1987 the prime minister announced the government's endorsement of the Policy.

The National Policy on Languages was adopted as a national plan to cover all of Australia's language needs and interests (English and English literacy, English as a second and foreign language and languages other than English, including Indigenous language rights, immigrant and foreign languages) as well as language services (research, translating and interpreting, public media).

One of its initiatives was for the co-ordination of research activity nationally, including the creation of the National Languages and Literacy Institute of Australia and its 32 constituent research centres across Australia. The aim of the NLLIA was to embed applied linguistics research into mainstream academic activity.

In its 1990 report to the International Conference on Education the Australian Department of Employment, Education and Training described the NPL as ".... one of the most influential documents in Australian education."

Today the NPL is often cited as an example of comprehensive and co-ordinated language planning.

== Books and major reports ==
- Lo Bianco, J., Lundberg, A and Spolsky, B (in press), Language Policy and Planning: State of Research and Future Directions. Bloomsbury.
- Cruickshank, K., Lo Bianco, J., Wahlin, M., (2024), Community and Heritage Languages Schools: Transforming Education. New York and London: Routledge.
- Helal, F and Lo Bianco, J. (2024), Language Politics in Tunisia: A Study of Language Ideological Debates. Bristol, UK: Multilingual Matters.
- Lo Bianco, J., Loh, E.K.Y., & Shum, M.S.K. (2024), Supporting the Learning of Chinese as a Second Language Springer.
- Lo Bianco, J. (2023), Language policy, literacy, and multilingualism, ch 31 in Language policy and planning: from theory to practice (Michele Gazzola, François Grin, Linda Cardinal and Kathleen Heugh), 2023, Taylor and Francis
- Mekonnen Alemu Gebre Yohannes (2021), author, contributors and editors, Joseph Lo Bianco and Joy Peyton Kreeft, Language Planning in Ethiopia: A Study of the Interplay and Tensions Between Language Policy and Practices in the Tigray Region, Springer.
- Lo Bianco, J. and Aronin, L., (2020), Dominant Language Constellations: A Perspective on Present-day Multilingualism. Dordrecht, NL: Springer. CO-AUTHORED AND EDITED BOOK
- Lo Bianco, J. (2019). Securing the promise: Sustaining, deepening and extending language education for all Victorians. Melbourne: Government of Victoria Department of Education and Training.
- Lo Bianco, J. (2021). Pharos: The Vitality and presence of Modern Greek in Contemporary Australia. Camberwell, VIC:Australian Council for Educational Research.
- Lo Bianco, J. (2019). Bilingual Education and Second Language Acquisition in Early Childhood Education: Synthesis of Best Evidence from Research and Practice. Melbourne: Government of Victoria Department of Education and Training.
- Lo Bianco, J. (2017). Multilingualism in Education: Equity and Social Cohesion: Considerations for TESOL. In Summit on the Future of the TESOL Profession. Athens, Greece: TESOL.
- Lo Bianco, J. (2016). UNICEF EAPRO – Suggestions for UNICEF EAPRO Strategy (2016–2020) on Multilingual Education and Social Cohesion: The University of Melbourne.
- Lo Bianco, J. (2016). Myanmar Country Report: Language, Education and Social Cohesion (LESC) Initiative. UNICEF.
- Lo Bianco, J. (2016). Malaysia Country Report: Language, Education and Social Cohesion (LESC) Initiative. UNICEF.
- Lo Bianco, J. (2016). Synthesis Report: Language, Education and Social Cohesion (LESC) Initiative. UNICEF.
- Lo Bianco, J., & Bal, A. (Eds.) (2016). Learning from Difference: Comparative Accounts of Multicultural Education. New York: Springer.
- Lo Bianco, J., Orton, J., & Yihong, G. (Eds.). (2009). China and English: Globalisation and the dilemmas of identity. Clevedon, UK: Multilingual Matters. Lo Bianco, J., & Slaughter, Y. (2009). Second Languages and Australian Schooling. Melbourne, Victoria: Australian Council for Educational Research.
- Lo Bianco, J., & Crozet, C. (Eds.). (2003). Teaching Invisible Culture: Classroom Practice and Theory. Language Australia Publications.
- Lo Bianco, J. (2002). Voices from Phnom Penh. Development & Language: Global Influences & Local Effects. Melbourne: Language Australia Publications.
- Lo Bianco, J. (2000). Games Talk: Language Planning for Sydney 2000. A legacy to the Olympic movement. Melbourne: Language Australia Publications.
- Lo Bianco, J., Liddicoat, A. J., & Crozet, C. (Eds.). (1999). Striving for the Third Place: Intercultural Competence through Language Education. Language Australia.
- Lo Bianco, J., & Freebody, P. (1997). Australian literacies: informing national policy on literacy education. Victoria: Languages Australia.
- Lo Bianco, J. (1987). National Policy on Languages. Australian Government Publishing Service

== Select journal articles and book chapters ==
- Ideologies of sign language and their repercussions in language policy In Maartje De Meulder and Kristin Snoddon (Eds) Ideologies in Sign Language Vitality and Revitalisation. Special Issue of Language and Communication d... https://doi.org/10.1016/j.langcom.2020.09.002 (doi: 10.1016/j.langcom.2020.09.002)
- Yasukawa, Keiko and Lo Bianco, J. (2020), A Literacy and Numeracy Policy for Adult Australians: a position paper from the Australian Council for Adult Literacy. ACAL Sydney, October, 2020 (with Pamela Osmond and Vanessa Iles for the Australian Council for Adult Literacy).
- Lo Bianco, Joseph (2020 online, 2021 print) The Discourse of the Edge: Marginal Advantage, Positioning and Linguistic Entrepreneurship. Language, Education and Linguistic Entrepreneurship: Critical Perspectives. 39, Multilingua Special Issue Linguistic Entrepreneurship, editors Peter De Costa, Lionel Wee, Joseph Park, https://doi.org/10.1515/multi-2020-0188
- Lo Bianco, J. (2019). Language planning and policies for bilingualism. In A. De Houwer & L. Ortega (Eds.), The Cambridge handbook of bilingualism (pp. 152–172). Cambridge, UK: Cambridge University Press.
- Oldfield, J and Lo Bianco, J. (2019). A long unfinished struggle: Literacy education and Indigenous cultural and language rights. To appear in J. Rennie & H. Harper (Eds.), Literacy education and indigenous Australians: Theory, research and practice. Berlin, Germany: Springer.
- Slaughter, Y., Lo Bianco, J., Aliani, R., Cross., and Hajek, J. (2019). Language programming in rural and regional Victoria: Making space for local viewpoints in policy development, Australian Review of Applied Linguistics.
- Lo Bianco, J. (2019). Uncompromising talk, linguistic grievance, and language policy: Thailand's Deep South conflict zone. In M. Kelly, H. Footitt & M. Salama-Carr (Eds.), Handbook on Languages at War. London, UK: Palgrave Macmillan.
- Lo Bianco, J. (2018). Provision, Policy and Reasoning: The Pluralisation of the Language Education Endeavour. In J. Choi & S. Ollerhead, Plurilingualism in Teaching and Learning (pp. 21–36). New York: Routledge.
- Lo Bianco, J. (2018). Reinvigorating Language Policy and Planning for Intergenerational Language Revitalization. In L. Hilton, L. Huss & G. Roche, The Routledge Handbook of Language Revitalization (pp. 36–48). New York: Routledge.
- Lo Bianco, J. (2017). Accent on the positive. In H. Peukart & I. Gogolin, Dynamics of Linguistic Diversity. (pp. 31–48). Hamburg: John Benjamins.
- Lo Bianco, J. (2017). Foreword. In S. Bagge-Gupta, A. Hansen & J. Feilberg, Identity revisited and reimagined : empirical and theoretical contributions on embodied communication across time and space (p. viii–x). Cham, Switzerland: Springer International.
- Lo Bianco, J. (2017). Resolving ethnolinguistic conflict in multi-ethnic societies. Nature Human Behaviour, 1(5).
- Lo Bianco, J. (2017). Using education to create cohesion from conflict. Pursuit. January 16.
- Lo Bianco, J., & Slaughter, Y. (2017). Language Policy and Education in Australia. In T. McCarty & S. May, Encyclopedia of Language and Education, Language Policy and Political Issues in Education (3rd ed., pp. 449–461). Springer.

== Awards and recognition ==
- Ramon Llull for Catalanistics and Cultural Diversity, Ramon Lull Foundation, Barcelon and Andorra, 2021
- Woxsen University Hyderabad India named a professorial chair, The Joseph Lo Bianco Chair in Language Policy Studies, 2024
- U21 Award for Internationalisation, Universitas 21, 2017
- Excellence in Engagement – Public Value Award, University of Melbourne, 2016
- Fédération Internationale des Professeurs de Langues Vivantes (FIPLV) 2015 International Award, International Federation of Language Teacher Associations
- Medal for Outstanding Service to Language Teaching in Australia, Australian Federation of Modern Language Teachers' Associations, Citation: ”In recognition of exceptional and outstanding contributions to language teaching in Australia over an extended period, that have significantly influenced the pattern and quality of language teaching and learning in Australia in beneficial ways." 7 July 2011
- College Medal, Australian College of Educators, March 2007
- Centenary Medal, Citation: "For service to Australian society and the humanities in literacy planning", March 2003
- Charles A. Ferguson Fellowship, Centre for Applied Linguistics (CAL), Washington DC, Awarded 2002
- Commendatore nell’Ordine di Merito della Repubblica Italiana, Awarded by the President of the Republic of Italy, “for services to language research and teaching and in recognition of contributions to Australian-Italian cultural relations”, 1999
- Fellow, Australian Academy of the Humanities. Citation: “one [of] the most influential writers in applied linguistics in Australia and internationally”, 1999
- Member of the Order of Australia (AM) "for service to the development of language policy and planning in Australia and overseas""; June 1998

== Honorary positions ==
- Associate; PASCAL International Observatory on Higher Education and Community Development
- Patron, Victorian School of Languages
- Fellow, Aspen Institute Italia
- Trustee, TIRF, International Research Foundation for English Language Education
- Inaugural Fellow, US Heritage Language Alliance
- Immediate Past and Foundation President and advisor, Tsinghua Asian Pacific Forum on Translation and Intercultural Studies, Beijing China
