= Indigenous education =

Education that focuses on teaching within formal or non-formal educational systems

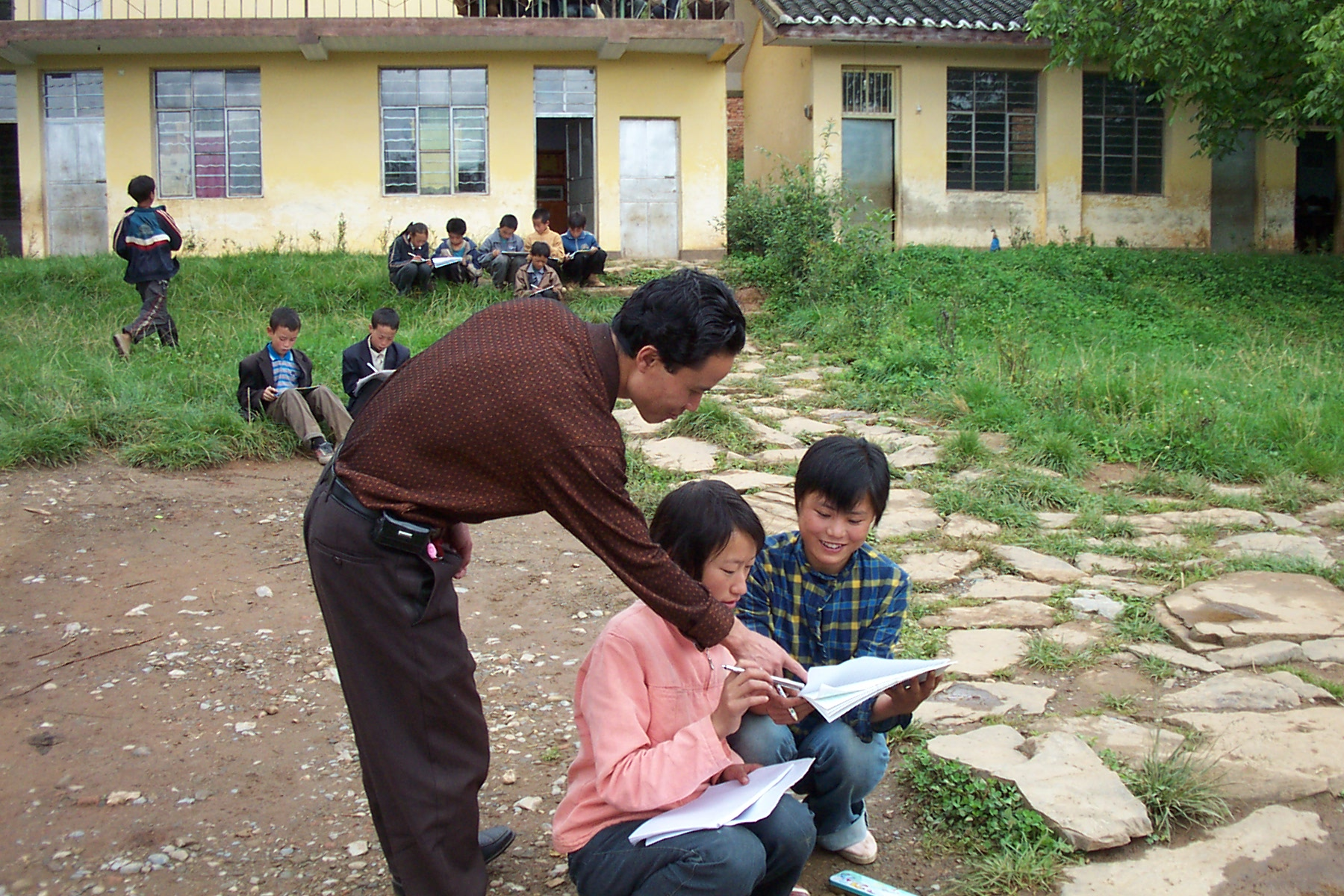
Principal Sha (also 6th grade teacher) of the Yangjuan Primary School in Yanyuan County, Sichuan looks over his students' essays about the schoolyard.

The eight Australian Indigenous ways of learning

Indigenous education encompasses a collection of time-honored traditions that can be applied across contexts and cultures. Rooted in communal learning, storytelling, and the celebration of tribal heritage, Indigenous methods have served local communities for generations.

Tribal instruction has preserved elder knowledge, fostered collaborative learning within familial contexts, and invited students to learn beyond the traditional classroom into rural and agricultural environments. Teaching that meets local needs and matches available resources is a self-sustaining model that can withstand external threats to localized education.

While Western methods of teaching reading, writing, and math to established standards have been successful in some contexts, the proponents of Indigenous education would say that spirituality, culture, and communal learning are vital to retaining the historical lessons of each region.

Indigenous peoples' right to education has been threatened throughout periods of colonialism, globalization, and modernity. In 2007, the United Nations passed the Declaration on the Rights of Indigenous Peoples, which makes particular reference to the educational rights of Indigenous peoples in Article 14. It emphasizes the responsibility of states to adequately provide access to education for Indigenous people, particularly children, and when possible, for education to take place within their own culture and to be delivered in their own language. While this was an important step forward, several avenues remain globally to more fully support and renew Indigenous education support and resources.

== Cultural context in the Americas ==
A growing body of scientific literature has described Indigenous ways of learning, in different cultures and countries. Learning in Indigenous communities is a process that involves all members in the community.

The learning styles that children use in their Indigenous schooling are the same ones that occur in their community context. These Indigenous learning styles often include observation, imitation, use of narrative/storytelling, collaboration, and cooperation, as seen among American Indian, Alaska Native and Latin American communities. This is a hands-on approach that emphasizes direct experience and learning through inclusion. Learners feel that they are vital members of the community and are encouraged by community members to participate in meaningful ways. Children often effectively learn skills through this system without being taught explicitly or in a formal manner. This differs from Western learning styles, which tend to include methods such as explicit instruction, in which a figure of authority directs the learner's attention and gives them tests and quizzes. Creating an educational environment for Indigenous children that is consistent with upbringing, rather than an education that follows a traditionally Western format, allows children to retain knowledge more easily because they learn in a way that was encouraged from infancy within their family and community.

Akhenoba Robinson further said that traditional Western methods of education generally disregard the importance of Indigenous cultures and environmental contributions, which results in a lack of relevance for students of aboriginal backgrounds. Modern schools have a tendency to teach skills stripped of context, which has a detrimental impact on Indigenous students because they thrive off educational environments in which their cultures and languages are respected and infused in learning. Various aspects of Indigenous culture need to be considered when discussing Indigenous learning, such as content (how culture is portrayed in text and through language), social culture/interactions (relations between class interactions and interactions within Indigenous communities), and cognitive culture (differences in worldview, spiritual understanding, practical knowledge, etc.).

=== Classroom structure ===
According to a 2019 publication by Akhenoba Robinson, the structure of Indigenous American classrooms that reflect the organization of Indigenous communities eliminates the distinction between the community and classroom and makes it easier for students to assimilate the material. Effective classrooms modeled off of the social structure of Indigenous communities are typically focused on group or cooperative learning that provides an inclusive environment. A key factor for successful Indigenous education practices is the student-teacher relationship. Classrooms are structured so that teachers share control with students. Instead of an authoritative role, teachers act as co-learners, balancing personal warmth with academic expectations. In Mexico, teachers allow students to move freely around the classroom to consult peers and seek occasional guidance from instructors.

Teachers in Indigenous classrooms in a community in Alaska rely on group work, encourage the students to watch each other as a way to learn, and avoid singling out students for praise, criticism, or recitation. Praise by Western standards is minimal in Indigenous classrooms, and when it is given, it is for effort, not for providing a correct answer to a question. Classroom discourse in Indigenous classrooms is an example of how the teacher shares control with the students. Observations in the Yup'ik and Mazahua communities show that Indigenous teachers are less likely to solicit an answer from an individual student, but rather encourage all of the students to participate in classroom discourse. In the Yup'ik classroom, direct questions are posed to the group as whole, and the flow of the discussion is not the sole responsibility of the teacher. Classrooms in Indigenous communities that incorporate Indigenous ways of learning utilize open-ended questioning, inductive/analytical reasoning, and student participation and verbalization in group settings.

=== Escuela Unitaria (one-room one-teacher) ===
In 2019, A. Robinson wrote that Escuela Unitaria is a one-room, one-teacher style of schooling that is used in some rural communities, which utilizes ways of learning common in some Indigenous or Indigenous-heritage communities in the Americas. The school serves up to six grades in a single classroom setting with smaller groups (divided by grade level) in the classroom. Community involvement is strongly implemented in the management of the school. Learning activities are not just inside the classroom but also outside in the agricultural environment. Children are self-instructed and the content involves the students' rural community and family participation. The school is structured to meet cultural needs and match available resources. This classroom setting allows for a collaborative learning environment that includes the teacher, the students, and the community. Integration of cultural knowledge within the curriculum allows students to participate actively and to have a say in the responsibilities for classroom activities.

=== Spirituality ===
Indigenous students make meaning of what they learn through spirituality. Spirituality in learning involves students making connections between morals, values and intellect rather than simply acquiring knowledge. Knowledge to Indigenous people is personal and involves emotions, culture, traditional skills, nature, etc. For this reason, Indigenous students need time to make connections in class, and often benefit from a safe and respectful environment that encourages discussions among students.

A 2007 study by Gilliard and Moore presented the experiences of eight Native American educators, focusing on the impact of having family and community culture included in the curriculum. Typically, tribal K-12 schools on the reservation have majority European American teachers. This study differs in that sense by studying educators who are entirely of Native American background and their interactions with students and families. These educators reported that their interactions with families stem from respect and understanding. There were three categories that surfaced when understanding and defining culture; (1) respect of children, families, and community, (2) building a sense of belonging and community through ritual, and (3) the importance of family values and beliefs.

1. Respect of children, families, and community: Educators approached interactions in a reflective and respectful way when talking with children, families, and the community. Educators accepted practices concerning death in individual families. Educators made it a point to be aware of curricular activities that may offend certain tribes. Lastly, educators spoke in a soft, quiet, and gentle way to the children.
2. Building a sense of belonging and community through ritual: Specific to the tribe on the Flathead Reservation, powwows are a community ritual that bring together families and community. Educators worked with families and their children to make moccasins, ribbon shirts and dresses, and shawls prior to the powwow, and included elements of a powwow into their classroom. For example, they keep a drum in the classroom to use for drumming, singing, and dancing.
3. Importance of family values and beliefs: Educators give parents opportunities to be involved in day-to-day activities in and around the classroom, such as meal times, play time, holidays, and celebrations. Educators collaborate with parents regarding curriculum around holidays and cultural celebrations, reinforced the importance of speaking their tribal languages, clarified with parents what their home language is, and had respectful discussions around traditional values and beliefs that led to compromise, not isolation or separation.

The educators in this study worked on a daily basis to respect, plan, and learn about parents' beliefs and values so they can create a community culture linked to the school curriculum.

Similar to the previous study mentioned, Vaughn conducted a multiple case study of four Native American teachers and two European American teachers at Lakeland Elementary in 2016. The participants were asked to draw from influences, relationships, and resources of the local tribe, local and state practices, and knowledge of effective pedagogies to co-construct knowledge.

At the time this study was conducted, Lakeland Elementary was failing to meet No Child Left Behind's yearly progress in reading. State officials would come to observe teachers unannounced to make sure they were teaching the mandated literacy curriculum. This required the teachers to follow the literacy program, even though the curriculum seldom met the individual and specific linguistic and cultural needs of the majority of Native American students at the school.

The researcher focused on two questions, the first one being, "In what ways did these teachers approach developing a curriculum to support their students' social, cultural, and linguistic needs?" One theme that came up was "pedagogical re-envisioning", which refers to the pedagogies and understanding of culturally responsive teaching to address writing, along with the understanding that each student has individual needs. With such an understanding, teachers can let students include oral storytelling to personalize their learning. The second question was "What shifts in teachers' pedagogical practices resulted from this collaboration?" Four themes came up; cultural resources, working with the community, multimodal approaches, and integrating students' experiences and interests from their lives outside of school into the curriculum. By addressing these four themes, teachers were able to re-envision how curricula can meet individual needs for many Native American students without leaving out their interests, culture, or resources.

=== Holistic approach to learning ===
Holistic education focuses on the "whole picture" and how concepts and ideas are interrelated, then analyzes and makes meaning of certain ideas. This form of education is beneficial for all students, especially Indigenous students. Traditionally, Indigenous forms of learning were/are holistic in nature, focusing on interconnections with context (especially culture, nature, and experiences).

According to a 2014 study, challenges that arise with using technology consistently can stem from a weak relationship between spending time outdoors and environmental knowledge and behavior in middle school-aged students in North Carolina. This weak relationship may be due to a change in relationship between children and nature. Instead of children having a natural interaction with nature, outdoor activities are based on organized sport or technology. Inclusion of Arts education constitutes a big part of student learning, it's an activity-based experiential subject

Middle school-aged Native American students reported higher levels of environmental behavior than Caucasian students, prompting environmental education professionals to continue to close achievement gaps in classrooms. Environmental education professionals continue to ensure that the same factors creating inequity don't affect environmental knowledge. Along with creating a classroom that strives to include environmental knowledge, promoting outdoor activities and direct interaction with nature gives a chance for Native American students to voice their knowledge to the teacher and to their peers.

Another form of holistic approach to learning includes parental and community advocacy. As reported by Pedro in 2015, parents of students expressed concern that the high school their children attended neglected their children's voices, knowledge, and perspectives in the school. The school districts diversity specialist sought advice to construct a curriculum that would validate, teach, and support the perspective of Native American peoples of the Southwest United States. This team constructed a curriculum based on three ideas; (1) Native American students are harmed when their curriculum is void of knowledge that reflect their identity, culture, and heritage, (2) students who are not Native American are harmed as they learn about narrowed and historicized depictions of Indigenous peoples of the United States, and (3) teaching knowledge from a variety of perspectives should be fundamental to any learning environment.

Pedro suggested, with the foundation of parents' values, that students are able to engage in conversations in their minds through critical dialogic listening in silence. Just because students weren't engaging verbally in the discussion, didn't mean students weren't receptive to the points being made by other students who were verbally engaged. Students can share their beliefs and identities through meta-conversations in connection with the voiced realities between other students. After hearing different sides of other students' stories, they were able to construct their own identities and understandings into the debate, silently.

To validate silence, the teacher records students' quotes and questions from both small- and whole-group discussions. At the end of each unit, the teacher uses these quotes and questions to guide student reflection and encourage students to revisit their notes, readings, and handouts. This practice allows students to contribute their identities, knowledge, and perspectives to the classroom environment in processes called literacy events, in which they were given the opportunity to absorb and make sense of different perspectives and ideas from verbal discussions in class and readings. Silence helped the students relate internally, and their perspectives became known through writing. In the end, students' stories were essentially in their minds and contributive towards the conversation as students chose whose ideas to accept and reject or a combination of both. Parents advocated for their children, and students who choose silence might not necessarily be disengaged or uninterested, but could instead be given other avenues to express their thoughts through.

== Indigenous American ways of learning ==
Indigenous education involves oral traditions (such as listening, watching, imitating), group work, apprenticeship, and high levels of cultural context. Additionally, knowledge to Indigenous people is sacred, centers on the idea that each student constructs knowledge individually, and is rooted in experience and culture. Learning is believed to be life-long, involve a unique sense of self-identity and passion, and focus on the importance of community survival and contributions to life and community sustainability. The Indigenous ways of learning occur when diverse perspectives are interconnected through spiritual, holistic, experiential and transformative methods. The optimal learning environment for Indigenous students incorporates the land (and traditional skills), Indigenous languages, traditions, cultures, people (self, family, elders, and community), and spirituality.

=== Active participation ===
Children in many Indigenous communities often begin to learn through their eagerness to be active participants in their communities. Through this, children feel incorporated as valued members when given opportunities to contribute to everyday social and cultural activities. For example, in a traditional village in Yucatán, Mexico, great importance is placed on engaging in mature activities to help children learn how to participate and contribute appropriately. Adults rarely force children to contribute, instead providing children with a great range of independence in deciding what to do with their time. Children are therefore likely to demonstrate that they want to be productive community members because they have been a part of a social, collaborative culture that views everyday work as something that everyone can partake and help in.

A main model of learning is to incorporate children in various activities where they are expected to be active contributors. Activities can vary from momentary interactions to broad societal foundations and how those complement their community's traditions. In Maya Belize culture, girls as young as four can work alongside their mothers when washing clothes in the river – rather than being given verbal instructions, they observe keenly, imitate to the best of their ability, and understand that their inclusion is crucial to the community.

Indigenous American communities emphasize the ability for community members of all ages to be able to collaborate. Children in this kind of environment not only learn how to participate alongside others, but are also likely to demonstrate an eagerness to contribute. The integration of children of different ages provides opportunities for different levels of observation, listening, and participation to occur, according to a 2010 study. Soon after, or even during an activity, children are often seen participating in the same previous social and cultural activities that they observed and participated in. By encouraging child immersion in activities rather than specifically asking for their participation, children have the freedom to construct their own knowledge with self-motivation to continue cultural practices alongside others.

Children in many Indigenous cultures actively participate and contribute to their community and family activities by observing and pitching in while informally learning to socialize and gaining a sense of responsibility amongst other skills. A mother reported that active participation in everyday activities gives children opportunities to gain direction in learning and working that other environments may not provide.

For instance, 15-year-old Josefina and her family own a small restaurant in an Indigenous community in Nocutzepo, Mexico, where the entire family collaborates to ensure the restaurant functions smoothly. This includes everyone from the grandmother, who tends to the fire for cooking, to 5-year-old Julia, who contributes by carrying the pieces of firewood. Josefina is one of the seven family members that contributes towards the family food stand. Through observation and listening, she learned that the food stand was the family's main source of income. Over time, Josefina pitched in and took over the food stand, thus learning responsibility, cooperation, and commitment. Nobody prompted her to help with the family business, but she learned the community's expectations and way of living.

=== Motivation ===
In Indigenous American communities, the inclusion of children in communal activities motivates them to engage with their social world, helping them to develop a sense of belonging. Active participation involves children undertaking initiative and acting autonomously. Similarly, learning by observing and pitching in (LOPI) supports informal learning, which generates self-sovereignty. The combination of children's inclusion, development of independence, and initiative for contribution are common elements identified in Indigenous American ways of learning.

Education in Indigenous communities is primarily based on joint engagement in which children are motivated to "pitch-in" on collective activities through developing solidarity within family, resulting in reciprocal bonds. Learning is viewed as an act of meaningful and productive work, not as a separate activity. When asked to self-report about their individual contributions, Indigenous Mexican heritage children placed emphasis on the community rather than on individual role. Their contributions emphasized collaboration and mutual responsibility within the community.

A study was conducted with children who had immigrated from Indigenous communities in rural Mexico. The children were less likely to view activities that Westernized culture regarded as "chores" to be a type of work. These children felt that activities such as taking care of siblings, cooking, and assisting in cleaning were activities that help the family. When asked how they viewed participation in household work, children from two Mexican cities reported they contribute because it is a shared responsibility of everyone in the family. They further reported that they want to pitch in to the work because helping and contributing allows them to be more integrated in ongoing family and community activities. Many Mexican-heritage children also reported being proud of their contributions, while their families reported the contributions of children are valued by everyone involved.

Learning through collaborative work is often correlated with children learning responsibility. Many children in Indigenous Yucatec families often attempt and are expected to help around their homes with household endeavors. It is common to see children offer help of their own accord, such as Mari, an 18-month-old child from an Indigenous family who watched her mother clean the furniture with a designated cleaning leaf. Mari then took it upon herself to pick a leaf from a nearby bush and attempt to scrub the furniture as well. Although Mari was not using the proper type of leaf, by attempting to assist in cleaning the furniture, she demonstrated that she wanted to help in a household activity. Mari's mother supported and encouraged Mari's participation by creating an environment where she is able to pitch in, even if not in a completely accurate manner. Parents often offer guidance and support in Indigenous American cultures when the child needs it, as they believe this encourages children to be self-motivated and responsible.

Children from the Indigenous communities of the Americas are likely to pitch in and collaborate freely without being asked or instructed to do so. For example, P'urepecha children whose mothers followed more traditional Indigenous ways of living demonstrated significantly more independent collaboration when playing Chinese checkers than middle-class children whose mothers had less involvement in the practices of the Indigenous people of the Americas. Similarly, when mothers from the Mayan community of San Pedro were instructed to construct a 3-D jigsaw puzzle with their children, mothers who practiced traditional Indigenous culture showed more cooperative engagements with their children than mothers with less traditional practices. These studies exemplify the idea that children from families that practice traditional Indigenous American cultures are likely to exhibit a motivation to collaborate without instruction. Therefore, being in an environment where collaboration is emphasized serves as an example for children in Indigenous American communities to pitch in out of their own self-motivation and eagerness to contribute.

=== Assessment ===
Children in many Indigenous American communities rely on assessment to master a task. Assessment can include self-evaluation and evaluation from external influences like family or community members. Assessment involves feedback given to learners from their support; this can be through acceptance, appreciation, or correction. Assessment is intended to assist the learner as they actively participate in their activity. While contributing in the activity, children are constantly evaluating their own learning progress based on the feedback of their support. With this feedback, children modify their behavior in mastering their task.

In the Mexican Indigenous heritage community of Nocutzepo, informal teachers observe learners performing tasks and demonstrate performing specific aspects of the tasks in order to improve the learners' performance. For example, a five-year-old girl shapes and cooks tortillas with her mother. When the girl makes irregular tortilla shapes, her mother focuses her daughter's attention on an aspect of her own shaping. By doing this, the young girl learns to imitate her mother's movements and improve her own skills. Feedback given by the mother helps the young girl evaluate her own work and correct it.

In traditional Chippewa culture, assessment and feedback are offered in multiple ways. Generally, Chippewa children are not given much praise for their contributions. Parents occasionally offer assessment through rewards (such as a toy carved out of wood, a doll of grass, or maple sugar), which are given as feedback for work well done. When children do not meet expectations and fail in their contributions, Chippewa parents attempt to refrain from using ridicule. The Chippewa also recognize the harmful effects of excessive scolding to a child's learning process. Chippewa parents believe that scolding a child too much would "make them worse", and holds back the child's ability to learn.

Amongst the Chillihuani community in Peru, parents bring up children in a manner that allows them to grow maturely with values like responsibility and respect, which ultimately influence how they learn in their community. Parents assess their children through praise, even if their contributions are not perfect. Additionally, feedback can come in the form of responsibility given for a difficult task, with less supervision. This responsibility is an important aspect of the learning process for children in Chillihuani because it allows them to advance their skills. At five years of age, children are expected to herd sheep, alpaca and llamas with the assistance of an older sibling or adult relative. By age 8, children take on the responsibility of herding alone, even in unfavorable weather conditions. Children are evaluated in terms of their ability to handle difficult tasks and then complemented on a job well done by their parents. This supports the learning development of the child's skills and encourages their continued contributions.

== Criticism of the Western educational model ==
Omitting indigenous knowledge amounts to cultural assimilation. The government stigmatizes indigenous learning, culture, and language to assimilate indigenous peoples and create a more homogenized country. A study on Malaysian post-secondary students found that indigenous children struggled with social and academic adaptation as well as self-esteem. The study also found that indigenous students had much more difficulty transitioning to university and other new programs compared to non-indigenous students. These challenges are rooted in the fact that indigenous students are underrepresented in higher education and face psychological challenges, such as self-esteem.

Globally, there is a large gap in educational attainment between indigenous and non-indigenous people. A study in Canada found that this gap is widened by the residential school system and traditionally Eurocentric curriculum and teaching methods. Stemming from the negative psychological impacts of attending residential schools in 1883, which were heavily influenced by Christian missionaries and European ideals and customs, a feeling of distrust towards Canadian schools has been passed down through generations. As a result of experiencing racism, neglect, and forced assimilation, the cycle of distrust has pervaded children and grandchildren, and so on. There is a continued lack of teaching of indigenous knowledge, perspective, and history.

As mentioned above, there has been a modern-day global shift towards recognizing the importance of Indigenous education. One reason for this current awareness is the rapid spread of Western educational models throughout the world. Critics of the Western educational model believe that, due to colonial histories and lingering cultural ethnocentrism, the Western model can not substitute for an Indigenous education. Throughout history, Indigenous peoples have experienced (and continue to experience) many negative interactions within Western society, which have led to the oppression and marginalization of Indigenous people.

=== Schooling the World ===
The film Schooling the World: The White Man's Last Burden addresses the issue of modern education and its destruction of unique, Indigenous cultures and individuals' identities. Shot in the Buddhist culture of Ladakh in the northern Indian Himalayas, the film fuses the voices of the Ladakhi people and commentary from an anthropologist/ethnobotanist, a National Geographical Explorer-in-Residence, and an architect of education programs. In essence, the film examines the definitions of wealth and poverty, in other words, knowledge and ignorance. Furthermore, it reveals the effects of trying to institute a global education system or central learning authority, which can ultimately demolish "traditional sustainable agricultural and ecological knowledge, in the breakup of extended families and communities, and in the devaluation of ancient spiritual traditions." The film promotes deeper dialogue between cultures and suggests that there is no single way to learn. No two human beings are alike because they develop under different circumstances, learning, and education.

The director and editor of the film Carol Black writes, "One of the most profound changes that occurs when modern schooling is introduced into traditional societies around the world is a radical shift in the locus of power and control over learning from children, families, and communities to ever more centralized systems of authority." Black continues by explaining that in many non-modernized societies, children learn in a variety of ways, including free play or interaction with multiple children, immersion in nature, and directly helping adults with work and communal activities. "They learn by experience, experimentation, trial and error, by independent observation of nature and human behavior, and through voluntary community sharing of information, story, song, and ritual." Most importantly, local elders and traditional knowledge systems are autonomous in comparison to a strict Western education model. Adults have little control over children's "moment-to-moment movements and choices."

Once learning is institutionalized, both the freedom of the individual and their respect for the elder's wisdom are ruined. "Family and community are sidelined...The teacher has control over the child, the school district has control over the teacher, the state has control over the district, and increasingly, systems of national standards and funding create national control over states." When Indigenous knowledge is seen as inferior to a standard school curriculum, an emphasis is placed on an individual's success in a broader consumer culture instead of on an ability to survive in their own environment. Black concludes with a comment, "We assume that this central authority, because it is associated with something that seems like an unequivocal good – 'education' – must itself be fundamentally good, a sort of benevolent dictatorship of the intellect." From a Western perspective, centralized control over learning is natural and consistent with the principles of freedom and democracy; and yet, it is this same centralized system or method of discipline that does not take into account the individual, which in the end stamps out local cultures.

=== Colonialism and Western methods of learning ===
Education systems in the Americas reinforce Western cultures, prior knowledge, and learning experiences, which leads to the marginalization and oppression of various other cultures. Teaching students primarily through European perspectives results in non-European students believing that their cultures have not contributed to the knowledge of societies. Often, Indigenous students resist learning because they do not want to be oppressed or labeled as 'incapable of learning' due to neo-colonial knowledge and teaching. The act of decolonization would greatly benefit Indigenous students and other marginalized students because it involves the deconstruction of engagement with the values, beliefs and habits of Europeans.

Decolonization practices in educational systems have been a rising trend globally. Researching Canadian Indigenous education suggests a few systemic barriers and approaches to advancing Indigenous student success through culturally responsive practices. Barriers included standardized testing, a colonized curriculum, and insensitive educational practices. Recommended systemic changes should include reframing assessment policies and practices, Indigenous cultural practices infused into the curriculum, and expanding teacher education preparation to best support Indigenous students. The call for decolonized and Indigenized curricula is not merely about adding Indigenous content to existing frameworks but also about fundamentally reimagining the nature of knowledge, learning, and education itself.

Teacher education preparation should contain multiple facets and certainly more than the minimal allocation given in most preparation programs. Pre-service educators should be given the opportunity for experiential learning such as indigenous guest speakers, learning about land based education, and cultural history. Pre-service educators should be asked to examine their own potential bias and given the opportunity to advocate for more professional development in indigenous education as appropriate to the needs of the students and population the educator serves. Immersion opportunities into Indigenous experiences should be given when and where appropriately available. Frequent training throughout teachers’ careers should be provided by school systems. When educators are more comfortable and knowledgeable in a style and understanding of how a variety of cultures learn best, the classroom becomes more inclusive and engagement increases for all learners. Quality relationships are key to student learning, and each culture has relationship interaction norms. Relationships grow faster and deeper when those norms are acknowledged and recognized, leading to better learning, behavior and academic performance. Indigenous culture and education is expansive and should be given more time and importance in the pre-professional preparation and certification process.

In a culture that has traditionally learned through holistic education, assessments and standardized testing protocols are often criticized. Standardized tests are intended to be objective but often contain cultural bias and systemic discrimination practices. This often disregards the cultural knowledge of marginalized groups. At the rate tests are given and define academic ability and excellence it becomes a continual cycle of neglect further increasing gaps in students education. The overreliance on standardized tests as a primary measure of academic success perpetuates a cycle of disadvantage, often leading to lower academic self-esteem, reduced educational aspirations, and higher dropout rates among Indigenous youth. This is why a culturally relevant curriculum is a critical component of education.

Change-making should involve a multifaceted effort that embraces the following principles. Indigenization through Etuaptmumk (two-eyed seeing) and decolonization. Etuaptmumk (a Mi’kmaw [Indigenous peoples of the Atlantic Provinces, Canada] concept of learning to see from both Indigenous and Western perspectives) provides a powerful framework for educational reform. When finding the strengths in both these perspectives, student learning and success become the focal point and all learners achieve more. Etuaptmumk has the potential to drive culturally responsive educational practices, curriculum, assessment and teacher preparation. Etuaptmumk recognizes the importance of Indigenous ways of learning as well as acknowledging and obtaining standards of mainstream education expectations.

While Indigenous curriculum is an important aspect of education, community support is also critical. Work in policy development to ensure best practices requires community advocacy and support. Access to holistic support systems also requires community action. Services such as access to elders, indigenous activities, healing practices, mentorship programs and other culturally relevant resources. Some schools have provided quality spaces for indigenous students such as resource centers where students host regular activities, gatherings, and feel a sense of belonging and recognition. Strong partnerships within an active engaged community are essential for decolonization to continue and the success of all learners.

== Pedagogical approaches ==
Decentralization requires a shift in education that steps away from Western practices. The following are pedagogical approaches aimed at empowering Indigenous students and Indigenous communities through education that does not rely on western culture.

=== Culturally relevant pedagogy ===
Culturally relevant pedagogy involves curriculum tailored to the cultural needs of students and participants involved. Culture is at the core of CRP and teachers and educators aim for all students to achieve academic success, develop cultural competence, and develop critical consciousness to challenge the current social structures of inequality that affect Indigenous communities in particular. Culturally relevant pedagogy also extends to culturally-sustaining-and-revitalizing pedagogy, which actively works to challenge power relations and colonization by reclaiming, through education, what has been displaced by colonization and recognizing the importance of community engagement in such efforts.

=== Critical Indigenous pedagogy ===
Critical Indigenous pedagogy focuses on resisting colonization and oppression through education practices that privilege Indigenous knowledge and promote Indigenous sovereignty. Beyond schooling and instruction, CIP is rooted in thinking critically about social injustices and challenging those through education systems that empower youth and teachers to create social change. The goal of teachers and educators under CIP is to guide Indigenous students in developing critical consciousness by creating a space for self-reflection and dialogue as opposed to mere instruction. This form of pedagogy empowers Indigenous youth to take charge and responsibility to transform their own communities.

Under critical Indigenous pedagogy, schools are considered sacred landscapes since they offer a sacred place for growth and engagement. Western-style schooling is limited in engaging Indigenous knowledge and languages, but schools that embrace critical Indigenous pedagogy recognize Indigenous knowledge and epistemologies, which is why Indigenous schools are considered sacred landscapes.

=== Land-based pedagogy ===
Land as pedagogy recognizes colonization as dispossession and thus aims to achieve decolonization through education practices that connect Indigenous people to their native land and the social relations that arise from those lands. Land-based pedagogy encourages Indigenous people to center love for the land and each other as the core of education in order to contest oppression and colonialism that is aimed at deterring Indigenous people from their land.

Land-based pedagogy has no specific curriculum because education and knowledge come from what the land gives. Unlike western practices with a standard curriculum, land-based pedagogy is based on the idea of abstaining from imposing an agenda upon others. Intelligence is considered a consensual engagement where children consent to learning, and having a set curriculum is thought to normalize dominance and non-consent within schooling and inevitably extended to societal norms. Western-style education is seen as coercive, because in order to achieve something, one must follow the set guidelines and curriculum enforced by educators. Individuals show interest and commitment on their own, thus achieving self-actualization and sharing their knowledge with others through modeling and "wearing their teachings." The values of land-based pedagogy are important to Indigenous people who believe that "raising Indigenous children in a context where their consent, physically and intellectually, is not just required but valued, goes a long way to undoing the replication of colonial gender violence".

=== Community-based pedagogy ===
Community-based education is central to the revival of Indigenous cultures and diverse languages. This form of pedagogy allows community members to participate and influence the learning environment in local schools. Community-based education embraces the ideas of Paolo Freirie who called for individuals to "become active participants in shaping their own education" (May, 10).

The main effects of instilling community-based pedagogy in schools are that parental involvement in decision making encourages children to become closer to their teachers, indigenous parents themselves gain confidence which positively impacts their children's learning, teacher-parent collaboration eliminates stereotypes that non-Indigenous teachers may have about Indigenous people, and communities collectively gain self-respect and achieve political influence as they take responsibility for their local schools.

The school environment under a community-based education system requires communication and collaboration between the school and the community. The community must share leadership within the schools and must be involved in decision-making, planning, and implementation. Children learn through the guidance, rather than determinants of their teachers or elders, and are taught skills of active participation. Out of community-based education arises community-based participatory research (CBPR), an approach to research that facilitates co-learning co-partnership between researchers and community members to promote community-capacity building. CBPR requires having youth-researcher partnerships, youth action groups, and local committees made up of youth, tribal leaders, and elders. This approach to research builds strength and empowers community members.

=== Culturally-sustaining-and-revitalizing pedagogy ===
In a 2014 publication, McCarty and Lee express that tribal sovereignty (Indigenous peoples as peoples, not populations or national minorities), must include education sovereignty. The authors report that culturally-sustaining-and-revitalizing pedagogy (CSRP) is necessary in education based on three items; (1) asymmetrical power relations and the goal of transforming legacies of colonization, (2) the reclamation and revitalization of what was disrupted and displaced by colonization, and (3) the need for community-based accountability.

CSRP is meant to off-balance dominant policy dialogue. This research follows two case studies at two different schools, one in Arizona and one in New Mexico. Tiffany Lee reports for Native American Community Academy (NACA) in Albuquerque, New Mexico. The core values for the school include respect, responsibility, community service, culture, perseverance, and reflection. These core values reflect tribal communities as well. NACA offers three languages; Navajo, Lakota, and Tiwa, and the school also seeks outside resources to teach local languages. This study emphasizes that teaching language is culturally sustaining and revitalizing; which creates a sense of belonging and strengthens cultural identities, pride, and knowledge. At NACA, teachers know they possess inherent power as Indigenous education practitioners. They make a difference in revitalizing Native languages through culturally sustaining practices.

The second case study was reported by Teresa McCarty at Puente de Hozho (PdH), that language has a different role for members of various cultural communities. At PdH, the educators reflect parents' influence (Dine and Latino/a) for culturally sustaining and revitalizing education. The goal is to heal forced linguistic wounds and convey important cultural and linguistic knowledge that connects to the school's curriculum and pedagogy.

Balancing academic, linguistic, and cultural interests is based on accountability to Indigenous communities. The authors describe the need for linguistic teachings as a "fight for plurilingual and pluricultural education." Educators can attempt to balance state and federal requirements with local communities and Indigenous nations.

=== Holistic Education ===
Holistic education emphasizes the interrelationships among knowledge, context, identity, and environment. Research across Indigenous education, classroom interaction, and outdoor learning demonstrates that holistic approaches support student engagement, wellbeing, and academic development. These approaches are particularly relevant for Indigenous learners, whose traditional pedagogies are relational, experiential, and grounded in land, community, and culture.

Indigenous ways of knowing are often marginalized when curricula and assessments privilege Eurocentric, standardized, and individualized forms of learning. Indigenous pedagogies frequently center oral traditions, collaboration, land based learning, and holistic understandings of knowledge. When these approaches are incorporated into schooling, Indigenous students experience stronger engagement, improved academic outcomes, and increased cultural relevance in their learning environments.

Holistic learning also includes attention to students’ socio emotional development and wellbeing. Researchers identify benefits for students’ self concept, collaboration, engagement, and mental wellbeing. Outdoor learning increased students’ ownership of learning and supported academic progress across multiple contexts. These findings align with concerns regarding the narrowing effects of standardized testing, which can limit opportunities for experiential and culturally grounded learning.

Silence and reflection are another key influential dimension of holistic learning. Silence is not merely the absence of sound but a complex communicative, relational, practice shaped by classroom power dynamics. Students often use silence to think, process, resist, or protect fragile identities within teacher dominated environments. When teachers recognize silence as a legitimate form of participation, students’ perspectives become visible through writing, reflection, and dialogic engagement. Students may engage in internal dialogue, described as “critical dialogic listening”, even when not verbally contributing, and that written reflection can serve as an important avenue for expressing identity and understanding.

Holistic approaches also require meaningful involvement of families and communities. Culturally nourishing schooling depends on partnerships with Indigenous families, epistemic mentoring for teachers, and curriculum grounded in community knowledge. Along with designed based research, researchers’ community members, teachers, and students are considered experts in educational needs and evaluating outcomes. This research method positions land, kinship, language, and community as foundational to meaningful learning. Belonging, in this framework, is physical, emotional, cognitive, relational, and learning is understood as ongoing, experiential, and connected to one’s home.

Holistic learning is not a single method but an interconnected set of practices: land based experiences, culturally grounded curriculum, reflective and relational pedagogy, attention to silence and student voice, and meaningful community involvement. For Indigenous students, and for all learners, holistic approaches create educational environments that honor identity and promote wellbeing by supporting academic success through culturally responsive, experiential, and relational learning.

== Indigenous knowledge ==
Differences exist between the underlying principles of Western science and the knowledges and wisdoms of Indigenous peoples. While these differences can cause tension among educators and researchers across all levels of education, examples exist of honoring Indigenous ways of knowing and incorporating these diverse understandings into the realm of valid and accepted knowledge.

Definitions of Indigenous knowledge vary, but examples include:

" … the unique, traditional, local knowledge existing within and developed around specific conditions of women and men indigenous to a particular geographic area."

" … the local knowledge that is unique to a given culture or society; it contrasts with the international knowledge system which is generated through the global network of universities and research institutes."

"Culturally informed understanding inculcated into individuals from birth onwards, structuring how they interface with their environments. It is also informed continually by outside intelligence. Its distribution is fragmentary. Although widely shared locally on the whole than specialized knowledge, no one person, authority or social group knows it all … It exists nowhere in totality, there is no grad repository."

The following traits often form the foundation of indigenous knowledge and differentiate it from other forms of knowledge, including Western science:

- Transmission is largely orally based.
- Knowledge comes from observing and participating and through trial and error.
- Foundation is in the spiritual, including the infusion of life force in both animate and inanimate objects.
- The world is viewed as interrelated.
- As a result of such interrelation, knowledge is integrative and holistic.
- Intuition, emotional involvement and subjectivity have value.
- Long-term and close interactions with natural phenomena provide a basis for knowledge.

=== Indigenous Research Methodology ===
Indigenous approaches to knowledge creation (i.e., research methodologies) also exist as means to further incorporate Indigenous ways of knowing and being into the research agendas of diverse academic disciplines.

While there is no broad homogeneity to research approaches from an Indigenous perspective, Michelle Pidgeon and Tasha Riley identify common principles of Indigenous methodologies that include:

- identity and relationality, often in the context of relationship to the land;
- respect for Indigenous knowledge, often including the importance of elders and knowledge holders, ceremony, and cultural protocols and traditions;
- relevance, that is, the ways in which the conducted research is meaningful and useful to the Indigenous communities themselves;
- responsibility, which includes clear articulation of procedures and accountability measures;
- reciprocity related to the sharing of knowledge and honoring of that knowledge;
- wholism, acknowledging the interconnectedness of all things; and
- Indigenous ethics, informed not only by formal research ethics but by generations of unethical research practices within Indigenous communities.

In keeping with all of these approaches, the positionality of the researcher also plays a key role in how they perceive and interact with others, influencing all layers of the research methodologies.

==== Pacific Research – Talanoa ====
Timote Vaioleti describes enacting the research approach of Talanoa, a combination of the Tongan words tala (to inform, tell, relate, command, ask, apply) and noa (ordinary, nothing in particular). Vaioleti describes this methodology as literally talking about nothing in particular. It operates without a rigid communication structure while still bringing together important qualitative information to better understand the circumstances of, particularly, Pacific peoples.

Talanoa has a home in the realm of phenomenological research, focusing on the meaning that participants give a particular experience—or phenomenon. The elements of reciprocity in the conversation between researcher and participant and the usually face-to-face and non-hierarchical interaction allow for a Talanoa methodology to align more closely with the collective values and mutual accountability the culture that inspires this approach. Though based in a Tongan perspective, elements of nonlinearity and responsiveness align with other Pacific nations, as well.

==== Research with the Moose Cree First Nation – Keeoukaywin: The Visiting Way ====
Janice Cindy Gaudet describes a methodology that emerged from her doctoral research, something she came to recognize as keeoukaywin, the Visiting Way. This approach began as a community-based research methodology and brought Gaudet to the community of Moose Factory, Ontario, Canada, home to the Omushkego people, the Moose Cree First Nation:

“While I was doing my field research, the people were showing me a more practical approach to research: visiting. Allen Sailors, a Cree knowledge-keeper living in Moose Factory, demonstrated how hospitality and teaching—characteristics of visiting—welcomed my whole self to be present in his home and with his family. He explained that this included sharing emotions, knowledge, ideas, and food from the land. It was important for him to respect the visitor, and for the visitor to reciprocate, in this space of sharing and being together.”

Gaudet’s further explanation of The Visiting Way as a way of remembering voices and stories while focusing on responsibilities to each other. Rather than treating the act of research as completely independent and separate, this approach adopts elements that are central to the Omushkego’s daily way of being. Keeoukaywin is a living practice that values mutual self-reflection in the communication process.

==== An Indigenous Researcher from Bangladesh – Storytelling as Lived Experience ====
Storytelling frequently comes up as an approach to research within Indigenous communities. Ranjan Datta describes a potential reason for that by saying, “In my Indigenous community in Bangladesh, we see our traditional stories as our lived experience.” (p. 38). Datta goes on to describe the challenge of sharing stories of struggle but identifies the ways in which such sharing can help overcome the trauma imparted by the stories themselves. Datta describes stories as alive and as daily practice, aligning such research with many of the qualities of indigenous methodologies listed above.

== Language revitalization efforts ==
Many Native American and Indigenous communities in the United States are working to revitalize their Indigenous languages. These language revitalization efforts often take place in schools, via language immersion programs. In Guatemala, teachers have had a sense of agency to teach students Indigenous languages as well as about Indigenous culture in order to prevent language loss and maintain cultural identity.

=== Importance ===
Researchers have brought up the importance of language revitalization efforts to preserve Native culture. The extinction of Native languages has been brought up as one of the reasons that revitalization efforts are necessary and McCarty, Romero, and Zepeda have noted that "84% of all Indigenous languages in the United States and Canada have no new speakers to pass them on." Native language is seen as a path to preserving Native heritage such as "knowledge of medicine, religion, cultural practices and traditions, music, art, human relationships and child-rearing practices, as well as Indigenous ways of knowing about the sciences, history, astronomy, psychology, philosophy, and anthropology."

"Duane Mistaken Chief, a member of the Blackfeet tribe, explains that American Indians use words and phrases to reconstruct their cultures and to heal themselves. By studying the Indian words, they learn to respect themselves. From the Indian point of view, the traditional language is a sacred gift, the symbol of one's identity, the embodiment of one's culture and traditions, a means for expressing inner thoughts and feelings, and the source of ancestral wisdom."

Additionally, linguists and community members believe in the importance of revitalizing Native languages because "it is at once a direction for research, action, and documentation." Finally, it has been suggested that it is especially important to recognize Native languages in school settings because this leads to teachers recognizing the people, which leads to self-esteem and academic success for the students.

=== School-based language immersion models ===
In 2007, Aguilera and LeCompte compared case studies of three different language-immersion programs in schools in Alaska, Hawaii, and the Navajo Nation. They examined evidence from prior research studies, examined descriptive documents from the study participants, conducted phone interviews and email exchanges with executive directors and school district administrators, and utilized other research on language-immersion models. In addition to qualitative evidence, they analyzed quantitative data such as school test scores and demographic.

Through their comparison of test data, Aguilera and LeCompte found that there was an increase in performance on state benchmark exam scores by the Ayaprun- and Dine'- immersion students. On the flip side, there was lower performance in these schools on the norm-referenced tests. However, the researchers note that these tests are often biased, negatively impacting Indigenous students. Ultimately, the researchers did not find that one immersion model had a higher academic achievement impact on Native students than the other studies. However, they "agree with language experts that total immersion is a more effective approach to achieving proficiency in a Native language."

Through their study, Aguilera and LeCompte examined the language nest and two-way immersion models. In 2007, another researcher, Lee, examined "compartmentalizing" through both quantitative and qualitative measures. Quantitatively, Lee examined language levels, language usage, and lifespan experiences of Navajo students. Qualitatively, Lee interviewed Navajo students to learn more about their feelings and opinions on learning the Navajo language. Below are descriptions of the three school models used in the studies by Aguilera, LeCompte, and Lee.

- Language nest – This model is used by the Native Hawaiian Aha Punana Leo consortium and begins in preschools. "In the language nest preschools, the Indigenous language is considered the student's first language, and children converse and study in that language, every day and all day." These students are taught in English only after they are literate in their Indigenous language.
- Two-way language-immersion model – In this model, maintenance of the Native language is promoted, while students also learn a second language. This model typically lasts from five to seven years. One form of a two-way language immersion model is the 50–50 model, in which students use English half of the class time and the target Native language the other half of the class time. The other model is a 90–10 model, in which students use the target Native language 90% of the time beginning in kindergarten. These students then increase the use of English "by 10% annually until both languages are used equally—a 50–50 split by fourth grade."
- Compartmentalizing — Schools that do not have full immersion programs often use compartmentalizing. Compartmentalizing refers to the Indigenous language being taught as a separate topic of study as opposed to having students instructed in the Native language for their academic content areas. According to Lee, compartmentalizing is the most common approach for teaching Navajo language in schools today.

Through her study, Lee concluded that "Navajo-language use in the home was the strongest influence over the students' current Navajo-language level and Navajo-language use." She noted that "schools need to become more proactive in language revitalization" and shared that she found the compartmentalizing language-immersion programs in her study "modest" and "the language was mostly taught as though all the students were monolingual English speakers." Ultimately, the researcher asserts that in order for language-immersion programs to be done well, schools need to invest in more resources, improved teaching pedagogy, and the development of students' critical thinking and critical consciousness skills."

=== Difficulties of implementation ===
Despite much interest in language revitalization efforts in Native communities, it can be challenging when it comes to program implementation. Research suggests several factors in the United States that make it difficult to implement language immersion programs in schools.

Aguilera and LeCompte found the following difficulties in their 2007 study:

- An "overwhelming pressure to teach English, especially due to the "recent emphasis on high-stakes testing in English"
- "Lack of importance given to cultural aspects of language by non-native educators and policymakers"
- Lack of family participation, due to parents' fears that their children will not learn English or be successful if they participate in an immersion program
- Securing long-term funding to sustain programs

Other studies found additional difficulties in implementation:

- Hostile policies: In 2014, McCarty and Nicholas conducted qualitative research on language revitalization efforts for the Mohawk, Navajo, Hawaiian, and Hopi people and found one difficulty in implementation was hostile policies toward bi/multilingual education efforts.
- Scarcity of Indigenous staff and resources: Mary Hermes opened Waadookodaading, a language immersion school centered around the Ojibwe language. The school is located near a reservation of about 3,000 enrolled members, but as of 2007, there were only approximately 10 fluent speakers. Because of massive language loss among Indigenous groups, it can be difficult to find fluent native speakers. It is necessary to have high language proficiency in order to teach in an immersion school. Not only do immersion teachers need to be fluent in the language, but they also need to be skilled in pedagogy which presents additional challenges.

Requirements from the NCLB state that paraprofessionals need to have at least an associate degree, and those working in the primary grades to have early childhood education coursework. Oftentimes, the people who would serve in these positions in language immersion schools are elders, and they do not have these requirements. Additionally, a lack of materials in Indigenous languages results in a demand on educators to produce the materials along the way.

- Conflicting perspectives: In 2008, Ngai conducted qualitative research on Salish language revitalization efforts by speaking with 89 participants through 101 interviews in three different school districts on the Flathead Indian Reservation. His goal through his research was to produce a framework that could be used for Native language education in districts that had a mix of Native and non-Native students. Ngai found that, "Language revitalization is particularly challenging in school districts with a mix of AI/AN and non-Native populations because of the co-existence of diverse and often conflicting perspectives."

=== Helpful factors in implementation ===
Despite the challenges of creating and maintaining immersion programs, there are many schools in existence today. Researchers suggest the following factors as helpful in leading to implementation of immersion models:

- Leadership and community activism – Aguilera and LeCompte noted in their 2007 study that having Indigenous leaders who are invested in implementing these models is critical. In another study, Ngai notes in 2008 that, "In public schools, the continuation of Salish language instruction since the 1970s can be attributed to the efforts of Salish-language teachers who are willing to step into a traditionally hostile setting in order to pass the language on to the young."
- School autonomy – Many schools have applied for charter status in order to protect language-immersion schools from being closed by school members who object to the programs. Charter status also allows schools the flexibility to gain more funding.
- Partnerships with higher education systems – In order to implement a language immersion model, schools must have trained teachers. Several of the communities where language immersion models have been successful are "situated in communities where there is access to higher education degree programs, and some of these postsecondary institutions offer Native language classes."

== Benefits ==
For Indigenous learners and instructors, the inclusion of Indigenous education methods into schools often enhances educational effectiveness by providing an education that adheres to Indigenous customs and languages in order to make it easier for children to transition into adulthood. For non-Indigenous students and teachers, such an education often raises awareness of individual and collective traditions surrounding Indigenous communities and promotes greater respect for multiple cultural realities.

Exposing students of all backgrounds to Indigenous education can benefit them by contributing to the reduction of racism in classrooms and increase the sense of community in a diverse group of students. Since most educators are non-Indigenous, and because solutions for current and future social and ecological problems may come from Indigenous thinkers, Indigenous educators and agencies can be called upon to help develop curricula and teaching strategies and promote advocacy on behalf of Indigenous peoples. Community elders can help facilitate the incorporation of authentic Indigenous knowledge and experiences into the classroom.

== Educational gap ==
Some Indigenous people view education as an important tool to improve their situation by pursuing economic, social and cultural development that provides them with individual empowerment and self-determination. Education is also a means for employment and a way for socially marginalized people to raise themselves out of poverty. However, some education systems and curricula lack knowledge about Indigenous ways of learning, causing an educational gap for Indigenous people. Factors for the education gap include lower school enrollments, poor school performance, low literacy rates, and higher dropout rates. Some schools teach Indigenous children to be "socialized" and to be a national asset to society by assimilating.

"Schooling has been explicitly and implicitly a site of rejection of Indigenous knowledge and language, it has been used as a means of assimilating and integrating Indigenous peoples into a 'national' society and identity at the cost of their Indigenous identity and social practices".

Intercultural learning is an example of how to build a bridge for the educational gap. Other factors that contribute to the education gap in Indigenous cultures are socioeconomic disadvantage, which includes access to healthcare, employment, incarceration rates, and housing. According to the Australian Government Department of the Prime Minister and Cabinet in their 2015 Closing the Gap Report, the country was not on track to halve the gap in reading, writing and numeracy achievements for Indigenous Australian students. The government reported that there had been no overall improvement in Indigenous reading and numeracy since 2008.

== Importance ==
Indigenous cultures usually live in a particular bioregion for many generations and have learned how to live there sustainably. In modern times, this ability often puts truly Indigenous cultures in a unique position of understanding the interrelated phenomena, needs, resources, and dangers of their bioregion. This is not true of Indigenous cultures that have been eroded through colonialism, genocide or forced displacement. Despite the historical denigration of Indigenous knowledge systems by Western educators, there is a current shift towards recognizing their value. The inclusion of aspects of Indigenous education requires people to acknowledge the existence of multiple forms of knowledge rather than one standard benchmark system. Many scholars in the field assert that Indigenous education and knowledge has a "transformative power" for Indigenous communities that can be used to foster "empowerment and justice."

In Canada, due to certain jurisdictions' focus on enhancing academic success for Aboriginal learners and promoting the values of multiculturalism in society, the inclusion of Indigenous methods and content in education is often seen as an important obligation and duty of both governmental and educational authorities. In the Canadian province of Manitoba for instance, collaborative efforts between the government and post-secondary institutions (both universities and colleges) has resulted in the implementation of 13 Access Programs spanning several disciplines and program focus areas. These Access programs often place emphasis on indigenous methods and content in the delivery of post-secondary education and training, while also providing students with a variety of other culturally sensitive supports (such as elders and mentors) in order to enhance their success in higher education.

Advocates of such programs often highlight the fact that, between 2001/02 and 2005/06 (most recent available data) a total of 800 students successfully graduated from these programs with post-secondary credentials, while an average of 70.8 per cent of all students enrolled during these same years were Aboriginal. According to these advocates, the inclusion of indigenous models of education in those Access Programs that are intended for Aboriginal learners, is an important factor contributing to the completion of post-secondary education for the estimated 566 Aboriginal students who would not otherwise have been likely to achieve this same level of success.

== Challenges ==
There are numerous practical challenges to the implementation of Indigenous education. Incorporating Indigenous knowledge into formal Western education models can be difficult. However, the discourse surrounding Indigenous education and knowledge suggests that integrating Indigenous methods into traditional modes of schooling is an "ongoing process of 'cultural negotiation.'"

Indigenous education often takes different forms than a typical Western model, as the practices of the Na ethnic group of southwest China illustrate. Because Na children learn through example, traditional Na education is less formal than the standard Western model. In contrast to structured hours and a classroom setting, learning takes places throughout the day, both in the home and in adults' workplaces.

Based on the belief that children are "fragile, soulless beings", Na education focuses on nurturing children rather than on punishing them. Children develop an understanding of cultural values, such as speech taboos and the "reflection" of individual actions "on the entire household." Playing games teaches children about their natural surroundings and builds physical and mental acuity. Forms of Indigenous knowledge, including weaving, hunting, carpentry, and the use of medicinal plants, are passed on from adult to child in the workplace, where children assist their relatives or serve as apprentices for several years.

However, increasing modernity is a challenge to such modes of instruction. Some types of Indigenous knowledge are dying out because of decreased need for them and a lack of interest from youth, who increasingly leave the village for jobs in the cities. Furthermore, formal Chinese state schooling "interferes with informal traditional learning." Children must travel a distance from their villages to attend state schools, removing them from traditional learning opportunities in the home and workplace. The curriculum in state schools is standardized across China and holds little relevance to the lives of the Na. Na children are required to learn Mandarin Chinese, Chinese and global history, and Han values, as opposed to their native language, local history, and Indigenous values. Methods of instruction rely on rote learning rather than experiential learning, as employed in Na villages.

Several individuals and organizations pay for children's school fees and build new schools in an attempt to increase village children's access to education. Yet such well-intended actions do not affect the schools' curriculum, which means there is no improvement in the sustainability of the children's native cultures. As a result, such actions may actually "be contributing to the demise of the very culture" they are trying to preserve.

== Organizations ==
Many organizations work to promote Indigenous methods of education. Indigenous peoples have founded and actively run several of these organizations. On a global scale, many of these organizations engage in active knowledge transfer in an effort to protect and promote Indigenous knowledge and education modes.

One such organization, the Indigenous Education Institute (IEI), aims to apply Indigenous knowledge and tradition to a contemporary context, with a particular focus on astronomy and other scientific disciplines.

Another such organization is the World Indigenous Nations Higher Education Consortium (WINHEC), which was launched during the World Indigenous Peoples Conference on Education (WIPCE) at Delta Lodge, Kananaskis Country in Alberta, Canada in August 2002. The founding members were Australia, Hawaiʻi, Alaska, the American Indian Higher Education Consortium of the United States, Canada, the Wänanga of Aotearoa (New Zealand), and Sápmi (North Norway). The stated aims of WINHEC include the provision of an international forum for Indigenous peoples to pursue common goals through higher education.

== See also ==
- Contemporary Native American issues in the United States#Education
- Alternative education
- Bilingual education
- Traditional knowledge
- Indigenous language
- Indigenous peoples
- Traditional ecological knowledge
- Traditional knowledge
- Indigenous rights
- Critical pedagogy of place
