= International scientific vocabulary =

Scientific and specialized words in current use in several modern languages

International scientific vocabulary (ISV) is the set of scientific and specialized words that are in current use in several modern languages. Although the language of origin of ISV may or may not be certain, they are used translingually, whether in naturalized, loanword, or calque forms.

The name "international scientific vocabulary" was first used by Philip Gove in Webster's Third New International Dictionary (1961). As noted by David Crystal, science is an especially productive field for new coinages. It is also especially predisposed to immediate translingual sharing of words owing to its very nature: scientists working in many countries and languages, reading each other's latest articles in scientific journals (via foreign language skills, translation help, or both), and eager to apply any reported advances to their own context.

== Instances ==
According to Webster's Third, "some ISV words (such as haploid) have been created by taking a word with a rather general and simple meaning from one of the languages of antiquity, usually Latin and Greek, and conferring upon it a very specific and complicated meaning for the purposes of modern scientific discourse". An ISV word is typically a classical compound or a derivative which "gets only its raw materials, so to speak, from antiquity". Its morphology may vary across languages.

The online version of Webster's Third New International Dictionary, Unabridged (Merriam-Webster, 2002) adds that the ISV "consists of words or other linguistic forms current in two or more languages" that "differ from Neo-Latin in being adapted to the structure of the individual languages in which they appear". In other words, ISV terms are often made with Greek, Latin, or other combining forms, but each language pronounces the resulting neo-lexemes within its own phonemic "comfort zone", and makes morphological connections using its normal morphological system. In this respect, ISV can be viewed as heavily borrowing loanwords from Neo-Latin.

McArthur characterizes ISV words and morphemes as "translinguistic", explaining that they operate "in many languages that serve as mediums for education, culture, science, and technology." Besides European languages, such as Russian, Swedish, English, and Spanish, ISV lexical items also function in Japanese, Malay, Philippine languages, and other Asian languages. According to McArthur, no other set of words and morphemes is so international.

It is not always practically relevant, to any concerns except philology and the history of science, which language any particular ISV term first appeared in, as its cognate naturalized counterparts in other languages are effectively coeval with it for most practical scientific purposes, as well as being self-evidently equivalent in surface analysis. This characteristic is corollary to the very nature of science: it is predisposed to immediate translingual sharing of words, as scientists, working in many countries and languages, are perennially reading each other's latest articles in scientific journals (via foreign language skills, translation help, or both), and eager to apply any reported advances to their own context. This theme applies even regardless of whether each instance of scientific exchange is openly collaborative (as in open science) or is driven by espionage or industrial espionage (as for example regarding weapons systems development).

The ISV is one of the concepts behind the development and standardization of the constructed language called Interlingua. Scientific and medical terms in Interlingua are largely of Greco-Latin origin, but, like most Interlingua words, they appear in a wide range of languages. Interlingua's vocabulary is established using a group of control languages selected as they radiate words into, and absorb words from, a large number of other languages. A prototyping technique then selects the most recent common ancestor of each eligible Interlingua word or affix. The word or affix takes a contemporary form based on the control languages. This procedure is meant to give Interlingua the most generally international vocabulary possible.

== Words and word roots that have different meanings from those in the original languages ==
This is a list of scientific words and word roots which have different meanings from those in the original languages.

Word or root	Scientific meaning	Original language	Original word	Original meaning	Notes
andro-, -ander	stamen, man	Greek	ἀνήρ, ἀνδρός	man	in flowers of flowering plants
gyno-, -gyne	carpel, woman	Greek	γυνή, γυναικός	woman	in flowers of flowering plants
capno-	carbon dioxide	Greek	καπνός	smoke	
electro-	electricity	Greek	ἤλεκτρον	amber	via static electricity from rubbing amber
-itis	inflammation	Greek	-ῖτις	pertaining to	
thorax	chest (anatomy)	Greek	θώραξ	breastplate	
toxo-	poison	Greek	τόξον	bow (weapon)	via 'poisoned arrow'. It means 'bow' in Toxodon and 'arc' in isotoxal.
macro-	big	Greek	μακρός	long	
In names of biological taxa
-ceras	ammonite	Greek	κέρας	horn	via resemblance to a ram's horn
-crinus	crinoid	Greek	κρίνος	lily	extracted from name "crinoid"
grapto-	graptolite	Greek	γραπτός	written	via resemblance of fossil
-gyrinus	labyrinthodont	Greek	γυρῖνος	tadpole	
-lestes	predator	Greek	λῃστής	robber	
-mimus	ornithomimid	Greek	μῖμος	mime	extracted from name Ornithomimus = 'bird mimic'
-mys	rodent	Greek	μῦς	mouse	including in Phoberomys
-saurus	reptile, dinosaur	Greek	σαῦρος	lizard	
-stega, -stege	stegocephalian	Greek	στέγη	roof	via their cranium roofs as fossils
-suchus, -champsus	crocodilian	Ancient; Egyptian	σοῦχος, χάμψος	Quoted by ancient Greek authors as Egyptian words for 'crocodile'	
-therium	usually mammal	Greek	θηρίον	beast, animal	
Names of bones
femur	thighbone	Latin	femur	thigh	Classical Latin genitive often feminis
fibula	(a leg bone)	Latin	fībula	brooch	tibia & fibula looked like a brooch and its pin
radius	(an arm bone)	Latin	radius	spoke	
tibia	shinbone	Latin	tībia	flute	via animal tibias modified into flutes
ulna	(an arm bone)	Latin	ulna	elbow, cubit measure	
Other
foetus / fetus	unborn baby	Medical Latin	fētus (var. foetus)	As 1st/2nd decl. adjective, 'pregnant' As 4th decl. noun, 'the young of animals'	

== Words and word roots that have one meaning from Latin and another meaning from Greek ==
This is a list of scientific words and word roots which have one meaning from Latin and another meaning from Greek.

Word or root	Scientific meaning from Latin	Example	Latin word	Latin meaning	Scientific meaning from Greek	Example	Greek word	Greek meaning	Notes
alg-	alga	alga	alga	seaweed	pain	analgesic	ἄλγος	pain	
crema-	burn	cremation	cremāre	to burn (tr.)	hang, be suspended	cremaster	κρεμάω	to hang (tr.)	

== Other words and word roots with two meanings ==
This is a list of other scientific words and word roots which have two meanings.

Word or root	Scientific meaning 1	Example	Origin	Original meaning	Scientific meaning 2	Example	Origin	Original meaning	Notes
uro-	tail	Uromastyx	Greek οὐρά	tail	urine	urology	Greek οὖρον	urine	
mento-	the mind	mental	Latin mēns	the mind	(of the) chin	mentoplasty	Latin mentum	chin	

== Other differences ==
Another difference between scientific terms and classical Latin and Greek is that many compounded scientific terms do not elide the inflection vowel at the end of a root before another root or prefix that starts with a vowel, e.g. gastroenteritis; but elision happens in gastrectomy (not *gastroectomy).

The Greek word τέρας (τέρατο-) = "monster" is usually used to mean "monster (abnormal)" (e.g. teratology, teratogen), but some biological names use it to mean "monster (enormous)" (e.g. the extinct animals Teratornis (a condor with a 12-foot wingspan) and Terataspis (a trilobite 2 feet long)).

== Haplology ==
A feature affecting clarity in seeing a scientific word's components is haplology, i.e. removing one of two identical or similar syllables that meet at the junction point of a compound word. Examples are:

- appendectomy = appendix, appendicis, (Latin for "appendix") + -ectomy (ultimately from Greek τομή, "a cutting")
- Dracohors = draco, draconis, "Latin for dragon" + cohors, "cohort"
- Hapalemur = hapalo- (Greek ἁπαλός, "gentle") + lemur

== See also ==
- Binomial nomenclature
- Classical compound
- Contemporary Latin
- English words of Greek origin
- Hybrid word
- Internationalism (linguistics)
- Latinisation of names
- Lexicography
- Language-for-specific-purposes dictionary (LSP dictionary)
- Medical dictionary
- Medical terminology
- Scientific terminology
- Scientific notation
- Systematic name
- Terminology
- Trading zones (metaphor) – Metaphor applied to collaborations in science

=== Lists ===
- List of abbreviations used in medical prescriptions
- List of Germanic and Latinate equivalents in English
- List of Greek and Latin roots in English
- List of Latin abbreviations
- List of Latin and Greek words commonly used in systematic names
- List of Latin words with English derivatives
- List of medical roots, suffixes and prefixes
