= Rural School and Community Trust =

The Rural School and Community Trust (Rural Trust) is an American national non-profit organization that aims to improve the relationship between rural schools and their communities. The Trust involves young people from rural areas in learning linked to their communities, aiming to improve the quality of teaching and school leadership, and advocating for change to state educational policies, including the issue of funding for rural schools.

== Publications ==
In addition to publishing reports, tool kits, and other publications discussing such topics as good rural high schools, place-based learning, small schools and consolidation, No Child Left Behind, school funding, and school evaluation, the Rural Trust has three periodical publications:

- Why Rural Matters, a biannual report with a state-by-state assessment of rural education in the United States
- Rural Roots, a monthly e-mail publication providing resources for practitioners including case studies, upcoming events, and funding opportunities
- Rural Policy Matters, a monthly publication available in print and e-mail formats focusing on rural education policy and funding news and issues

== History ==
The Annenberg Rural Challenge was founded in July 1995 when a grant of $46.75 million was given by the Annenberg Challenge to study and implement school reform in rural America. The Rural Challenge in turn gave hundreds of grants to rural communities in the United States. In 1999, the Annenberg Rural Challenge transitioned from grantmaking to working to improve student learning and to strengthen community life through advocacy, research, and publications.
