= Internationalism (linguistics) =

Loanword that occurs in several languages, with the same or similar meaning and etymology

In linguistics, an internationalism or international word is a loanword that occurs in several languages (that is, translingually) with the same or at least similar meaning and etymology. These words exist in "several different languages as a result of simultaneous or successive borrowings from the ultimate source". Pronunciation and orthography are similar so that the word is understandable between the different languages.

It is debated how many languages are required for a word to be considered an internationalism. Furthermore, the languages required can also depend on the specific target language at stake. For example, according to Ghil'ad Zuckermann, the most important languages that should include the same lexical item in order for it to qualify as an internationalism in Hebrew are Yiddish, Polish, Russian, French, German and English.

The term is uncommon in English, although English has contributed a considerable number of words to world languages, e.g., the sport terms football, baseball, cricket, and golf.

International scientific vocabulary is a class of terms that contains many internationalisms. For some of them it is known which modern language used them first, whereas for others it is not traceable, but the chronologic sequence is usually of limited practical importance anyway, as almost immediately after their origination they appeared in multiple languages.

== Origins ==
European internationalisms originate primarily from Latin or Greek, but from other languages as well. However, due to English being the main lingua franca of the Western world, an increasing number of internationalisms originate from English. Many non-European words have also become international.

== Diffusion ==
Internationalisms often spread together with the innovations they designate. Accordingly, there are semantic fields dominated by specific languages, e.g. the computing vocabulary which is mainly English with internationalisms such as computer, disk, and spam. New inventions, political institutions, foodstuffs, leisure activities, science, and technological advances have all generated new lexemes and continue to do so: bionics, cybernetics, gene, coffee, chocolate, etc..

Some internationalisms are spread by speakers of one language living in geographical regions where other languages are spoken. For example, some internationalisms coming from the English in India are bungalow, jute, khaki, mango, pyjamas, and sari.

== Examples ==
- Academy
- Airport
- Ambulance
- Ananas (pineapple in English)
- Antenna
- Athlete
- Atom
- Automobile
- Baby
- Bacon
- Ballerina
- Ballet
- Bar
- Blog
- Bravo
- Burger
- Bus
- Cabin
- Cable
- Centre (or center)
- Chocolate
- Coffee
- Cola
- Colony
- Comedy
- Computer
- Copy
- Corridor
- Coupon
- Delta
- Design
- Dictator
- Diploma
- Doctor
- Foxtrot
- Golf
- Gorilla
- Harmony
- Hospital
- Hotel
- Inspection
- International
- Internet
- Interview
- League
- Literature
- Machine
- Magnet
- Mama
- Manga
- Margarine
- Marmalade
- Massage
- Medal
- Medicine
- Menu
- Metro
- Microphone
- Microscope
- Motor
- Number
- Okay (or OK)
- Olympiad
- Operation
- Papa
- Party
- Pedal
- Pistol
- Pizza
- Police
- Politics
- Psychology
- Quiz
- Radio
- Register
- Sandal
- Sandwich
- Sardine
- Satan
- Sauna
- Shock
- Signal
- Sport
- Station
- Stress
- Studio
- Taboo
- Tango
- Taxi
- Telephone
- Telescope
- Television
- Tennis
- Test
- Tokamak
- Tomahawk
- Tomato
- Tractor
- Transport
- Tsunami
- Uniform
- Visa
- Whiskey
- X-ray

== See also ==
- Classical compound – Compound words composed from Latin or ancient Greek
- Greek and Latin roots in English
- Hybrid word – Word that etymologically derives from at least two languages
- International scientific vocabulary – Scientific and specialized words in current use in several modern languages
- Phono-semantic matching – Type of multi-source neologism
- Trading zones (metaphor) – Metaphor applied to collaborations in science
