= Suresh Canagarajah =

Sri Lankan-American linguist and academic

- Known for: Work on translanguaging and linguistic imperialism

Academic background
- Education: University of Kelaniya (BA); Bowling Green State University (MA); University of Texas at Austin (PhD)
- Thesis: Negotiating competing discourses and identities: A sociolinguistic analysis of challenges in academic writing for minority students (1990)

Academic work
- Discipline: Linguist
- Sub-discipline: English as a second or foreign language
- Institutions: Pennsylvania State University; Baruch College

Athelstan Suresh Canagarajah is a Tamil-born Sri Lankan linguist and currently an Edwin Erle Sparks Professor of Applied linguistics, English, and Asian studies at Pennsylvania State University, where he has been a member of the faculty since 2007. His research covers World Englishes and teaching English to speakers of other languages. He has published works on translingualism, translanguaging, linguistic imperialism, and social and political issues in language education, including codemeshing and language "shuttling." His book, Translingual Practice: Global Englishes and Cosmopolitan Relations, has won three nationally recognized best book awards.

== Selected publications ==
- Translingual Practice: Global Englishes and Cosmopolitan Relations. New York and Abingdon: Routledge, 2013. pp. xxii-230.
- Canagarajah, A. (1999). Resisting linguistic imperialism in English language teaching. Oxford: Oxford University Press.

== Notable awards ==
- American Association for Applied Linguistics (AAAL) 2020 Best Book Award for Routledge Handbook for Migration and Language
- American Association for Applied Linguistics (AAAL) 2016 Inaugural Best Book Award for Translingual Practice: Global Englishes and Cosmopolitan Relations
- British Association for Applied Linguistics (BAAL) 2014 Book Prize for Translingual Practice: Global Englishes and Cosmopolitan Relations
- Modern Language Association of America 2012-2013 Mina P. Shaughnessy Award for Translingual Practice: Global Englishes and Cosmopolitan Relations
- Conference on College Composition and Communication (CCCC) 2007 Richard Braddock Award for “The Place of World Englishes in Composition: Pluralization Continued"
- Modern Language Association of America 1999 Mina P. Shaughnessy Award for Resisting Linguistic Imperialism in English Teaching
