= David Sobel =

American educator

Academic background
- Education: Williams College (BA); Antioch University New England (MEd)

Academic work
- Sub-discipline: Place-based education Developmental Theory; Environmental education
- Institutions: Harrisville Children’s Center; University of New Hampshire; Antioch University New England

David Sobel is an American educator and academic, responsible for developing the philosophy of place-based education. He has written extensively on the topic in books and numerous articles. He is currently a core faculty member and director of certificate programs at Antioch University New England.

== Education ==
Sobel earned a Bachelor of Arts degree in English from Williams College and a Master of Education from Antioch University New England.

== Career ==
Sobel was a co-founder and director of Harrisville Children's Center in Harrisville, New Hampshire from 1972 to 1975. He was a curriculum coordinator for Yankee Lands: A Land Use Curriculum Project from 1980 to 1983. He was a core faculty member in the Education and Environmental Studies Departments at Antioch New England Graduate School from 1977 to 1986, chairperson for the Education Department from 1983 to 1997, and has been the director of Teacher Certification Programs since 1997. Sobel was project director for the Know Nukes Institute from 1982 to 1987.

Sobel has worked as a doctoral advisor at the University of New Hampshire. His work appeared in Orion magazine.

== Bibliography ==
- Childhood and Nature: Design Principles for Educators (Stenhouse Publishers, 2008) ISBN 1-57110-741-X
- Place-Based Education: Connecting Classrooms and Communities (Great Barrington, MA: Orion Society, 2004) ISBN 0-913098-54-X
- Mapmaking with Children: Sense-of-Place Education for the Elementary Years (Portsmouth, NH: Heineman, 1998) ISBN 0-325-00042-5
- Children's Special Places: Exploring the Role of Forts, Dens, and Bush Houses in Middle Childhood (Tucson, AZ: Zephyr Press, 1993) ISBN 0-913705-81-0
- Beyond Ecophobia: Reclaiming the Heart in Nature Education (Great Barrington, MA: Orion Society, 1996) ISBN 0-913098-50-7
