= Translanguaging =

Linguistic term coined by Cen Williams

Translanguaging is a term that can refer to different aspects of multilingualism. It can describe the way bilinguals and multilinguals use their linguistic resources to make sense of and interact with the world around them. It can also refer to a pedagogical approach that utilizes more than one language within a classroom lesson. The term "translanguaging" was coined in the 1980s by Cen Williams (applied in Welsh as trawsieithu) in his unpublished thesis titled "An Evaluation of Teaching and Learning Methods in the Context of Bilingual Secondary Education". Williams used the term to describe the practice of using two languages in the same lesson, which differed from many previous methods of bilingual education that tried to separate languages by class, time, or day. In addition, Vogel and Garcia argued that translanguaging theory posits that rather than possessing two or more autonomous language systems, as previously thought when scholars described bilingual or multilingual speakers, bilinguals and multilingual speakers select and deploy their languages from a unitary linguistic repertoire. However, the dissemination of the term, and of the related concept, gained traction decades later due in part to published research by Ofelia García, among others. In this context, translanguaging is an extension of the concept of languaging, the discursive practices of language speakers, but with the additional feature of using multiple languages, often simultaneously. It is a dynamic process in which multilingual speakers navigate complex social and cognitive demands through strategic employment of multiple languages.

Translanguaging involves issues of language production, effective communication, the function of language, and the thought processes behind language use. Translanguaging is a result of bilingualism. The term is often employed in a pedagogical setting, but it also has applications to any situation experienced by multilingual speakers, who constitute most language communities in the world. This includes complex linguistic family dynamics, the use of code-switching, and how that usage relates to one's understanding of their own multilingualism.

This article provides an overview of translanguaging, major debates around translanguaging, and the pedagogical methods to teach translanguaging in multicultural educational settings.

== History ==
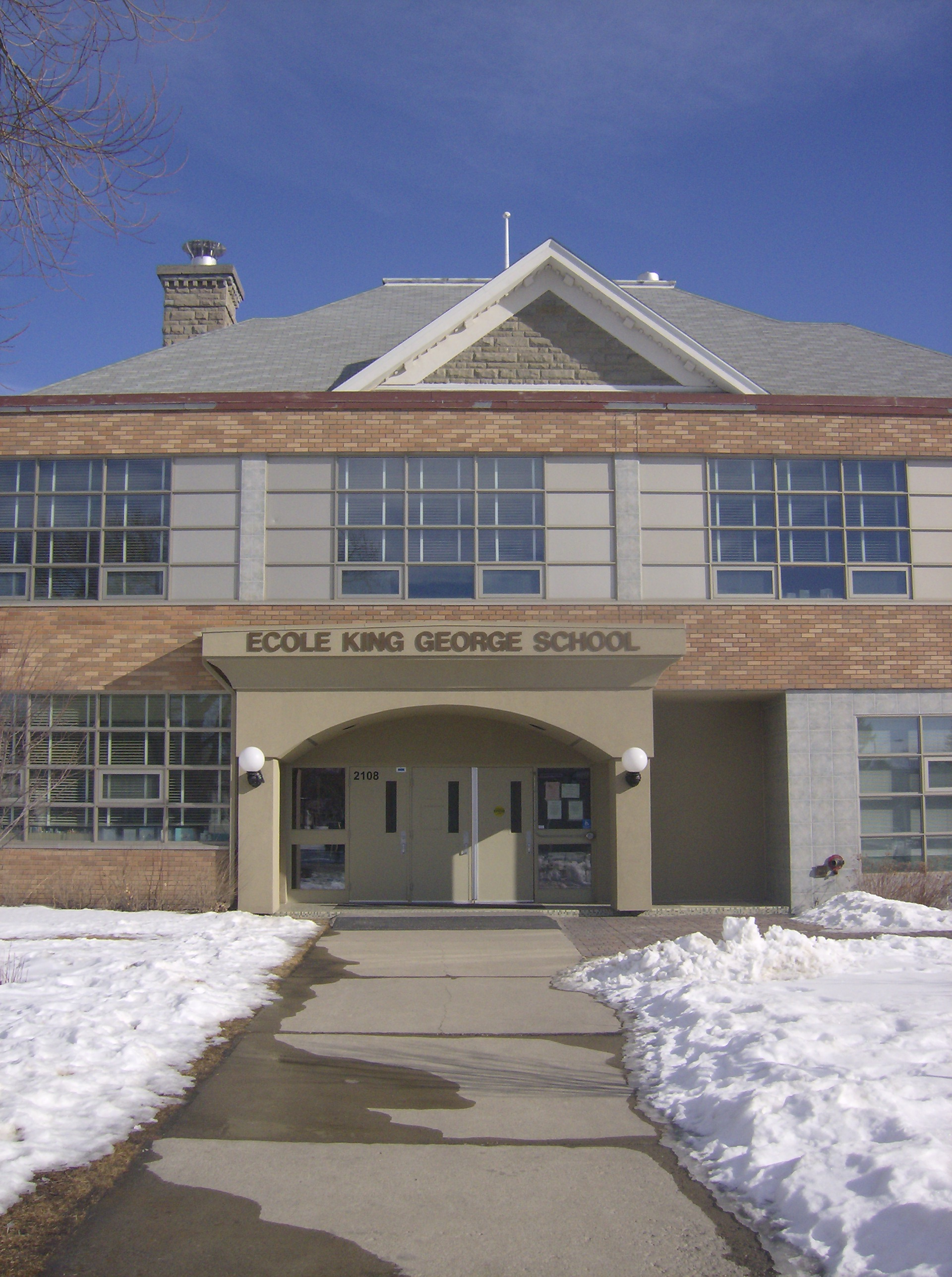
The doors of King George School in Calgary, Alberta. This started as a regular English neighbourhood school in 1912, became dual-track English-French in 1987 and single-track French immersion in 2002.

Archeological evidence points to bilingual education going back to at least 4000–5000 years. While most modern research about bilingual education focuses on the later 20th century, there is also research that shows Greek and Latin both being learned by Roman aristocrats. Modern bilingual education systems emerged across Europe and North America in the 1960s and 1970s such as French immersion in Canada.

The ideology behind translanguaging emerged from the evolution of multilingual teaching practices, particularly the practices promoted by Teaching English to Speakers of Other Languages (TESOL), an international association designed to advance the quality of English language instruction. The beginnings of bilingual education in the United States asserted the primacy of speech and neglected written language learning. The second language instruction of the 1960s and 70s heavily utilized oral–aural drills, and written portions of the courses were mimetic and repetition oriented, and structure, form, syntax, and grammar were given priority status for learners. In this system there was no focus on actual language use, which led to a lack of knowledge about how language and communication work in real practice.

In the late 1970s and 80s second-language education shifted to focus on the importance of communication and language use for participation in particular discourse communities. However, emphasizing language learning as a means to enter a discourse community was also problematic, as it pressured students to surrender their own language practices in order to become practicing members of the new discourse communities.

Translanguaging as a focus of study first emerged in Bangor, Wales, in the 1980s. It is based on François Grosjean's idea that bilinguals are not two monolinguals in one. Cen Williams and his colleagues were researching strategies of using both Welsh and English in a single lesson in a classroom setting. Cen Williams' Welsh term trawsieithu was translated into English as translanguaging by his colleague Colin Baker.

== Major debates ==
A prominent argument against incorporating translanguaging into academic contexts is the notion that speakers of International Englishes would have difficulty communicating with one another because of the immense variety of Englishes spoken. However, advocates for translanguaging pedagogy maintain that misunderstandings between speakers of International Englishes who practice translanguaging are not common, and when misunderstandings do occur between speakers, they are quickly resolved through other means of negotiation. Advocates argue that speakers of International Englishes can communicate with relative ease because they have a variety of tools for making sense of the language varieties with which they engage.

Some academics call for the development of corpora of "nonstandard" English varieties to aid with the study of translanguaging.

Barbara Seidlhofer argues that language acquisition programs should not be teaching language with the intention of achieving native-speaker competence, but that they should be "embracing the emergent realistic goal of intercultural competence achieved through a plurilingualism that integrates rather than ostracizes" International Englishes. This pedagogical strategy necessitates translanguaging as a means through which to accomplish such plurilingualism. For Seidlhofer, the incorporation of such International Englishes into educational systems would be more beneficial for second language learners than current dominant language acquisition pedagogies, which emphasize standard American and British varieties of English. Since achieving native-speaker status is nearly impossible without years of study, translanguaging presents students with opportunities to learn language in a more supportive space, fostering their language acquisition in all varieties rather than enforcing the participation in and acquisition of a single dominant variety.

Proponents of decolonizing the English language argue that holding on to particular varieties of English as the only legitimate varieties to use in language acquisition programs is a practice that perpetuates destructive colonial attitudes towards non-English languages and the English varieties of their speakers. Incorporating translanguaging is one means through which such a decolonization of the English language could occur. In this way, decentralizing those particular dominant varieties of English would work towards legitimizing the use of "nonstandard" English varieties at the educational level.

Furthermore, Suresh Canagarajah argued that translanguaging allows students to use and negotiate meanings by using forms of language to communicate. Therefore, he believed that the concept empowers multilingual speakers and writers to be modest, open minded, and aware of the language hegemony. Another proponent of translanguaging is April Baker-Bell, who argues that African American English is a distinct language from Standard American English. Additionally, she contends that allowing African American students to code-mesh prevents forced assimilation into white mainstream culture and enhances their understanding of how their culture and language are misrepresented. Some compositionists view translanguaging as the communicative reality of global citizens. Other linguists have argued against the use of the first language (L1) in second language (L2) learning settings, maintaining that L1 usage negatively impacts L2 acquisition. Their rationale is that students will be less exposed to the target language and have fewer opportunities to listen and speak L2. Therefore, they support the approach that excludes L1 and proposes that L2 should be the only language taught to bilingual students.

Scholars argue that translanguaging functions as an emancipation from the adverse second language acquisition pedagogies of the 20th century. They believe that translanguaging gives multilingual students an advantage within educational systems because it (1) promotes a more thorough understanding of content; (2) helps the development of the weaker language for bilingual or multilingual speakers; (3) fosters home-to-school links within language use; and (4) integrates fluent speakers with early learners, thus expediting the language learning process.

== Translanguaging and Code-switching ==
Translanguaging's relationship to the concept of code-switching depends on the framework of translanguaging used. Multiple models have been created to describe the cognitive processing of language and how multilingualism functions and manifests within an individual speaker. The unitary model of translanguaging, derived from postmodernism in linguistics, considers code-switching to be a separate phenomenon from translanguaging. This is because the unitary model defines code-switching as a dual competence model, which assumes that the linguistic systems of an individual are separate without overlap. The dual competence model of code-switching directly contrasts with the post-modernist's unitary model, which theorizes that a speaker only possesses a singular linguistic system, thereby making code-switching irreconcilable with translanguaging. On the other hand, the integrated model of translanguaging takes a more centrist position. It considers code-switching to be an aspect of translanguaging alongside other multilingual activities like translation, because an individual's internal linguistic systems are thought to be overlapping but not unitary.

Linguistic postmodernists do not recognize code-switching as translanguaging because they call into question the very idea of discrete languages, arguing that they are inventions created through various cultural, political, or social processes. Postmodernists acknowledge that linguistic differences may exist between "languages", but the concept of a "language" as an abstract and independent entity is considered a social construct. When applied to translanguaging theory, postmodernists argue that an individual's linguistic competence is the sum of their individual interactions with other speakers and overall linguistic knowledge. Each person has an individually distinct linguistic repertoire, or idiolect, because of their unique socialization experience. The internal linguistic system is considered unitary and encompasses all grammatical and lexical systems. Hence, the discrete systems of linguistic competence given by code-switching cannot be considered part of translanguaging in the unitary model.

The integrated model takes a position closer to the center of the two extremes on linguistic systems. The model was developed from critiques to the unitary model, stating that the conclusions from the postmodernists were the product of theory, rather than linguistic data on multilingualism. The model posits that the internal linguistic system for any given individual is constructed with discrete lexical systems for each "language" and overlapping grammatical systems that can share phonetic, morphological, phonological, and semantic features. Linguistic systems are thought to rely on each system's linguistic structuring and whether the structuring can be done with or without cognitive differentiation. The integrated model then conceptualizes theories on code-switching to be aspects of translanguaging itself, because both the integrated model on translanguaging and code-switching assume some shared features and some distinction between cognitive linguistic systems.

== Translanguaging in Deaf culture ==
Translanguaging in Deaf culture focuses on sensorial accessibility, as translanguaging still exists in Deaf culture; it is just different than translanguaging in non-Deaf speakers. Translanguaging can be used prescriptively and descriptively and uses a speaker's entire linguistic range with disregard to the social and political sphere of languages. It also can be seen as the language practices of bilingual speakers. An ongoing issue in the Deaf community is the push for signed languages to be considered minority languages, since deaf speakers have a "sensorial inaccessibility to spoken languages." There is also an issue of access to signed languages for deaf children, as for many, this access is compromised. Deaf speakers also face sensorial asymmetries, and theories like translanguaging may threaten the political discourse for sign language rights as signed languages were seen as merely gestures fifty years ago, but not as real languages. Since deaf children use a variation of both signed and spoken languages, they share experiences similar to that of other bilingual children. Translanguaging in the Deaf community is thus unique because they use both visual and gestural, as well as spoken and written language modality.

Translanguaging, as described by Dan Hoffman, helps deaf people understand new concepts by connecting what someone already knows with what they are trying to learn. For example, in a study by Swanwick in 2015, translanguaging was found to assist in both language and content learning. In another study involving deaf readers, Ausbrooks asked deaf individuals to use translanguaging while reading English text and explaining it in American Sign Language (ASL). They discovered a strong link between the readers' comprehension of English text and their skills in ASL, including vocabulary, language structure, and meaning.

== International Translanguaging ==
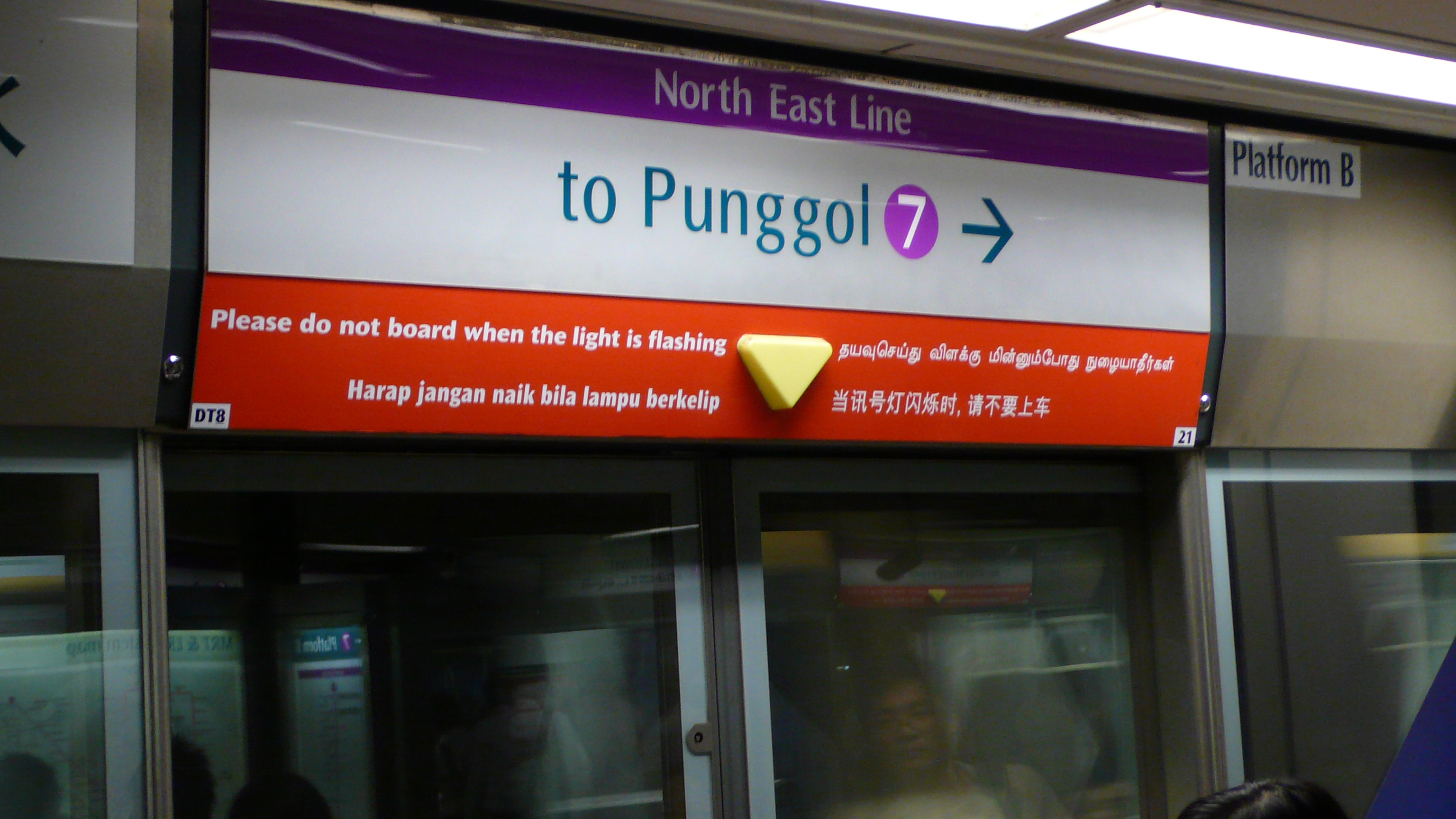
Multilingual sign in Singapore written in the official languages of English, Mandarin, Tamil, and Malay

Non-native speakers of English around the world outnumber native English speakers of English by a ratio of 3:1. With the current influx of technology and communication, English has become a heavily transnational language. As such, English varieties and International Englishes are becoming standard usage in international economic exchanges, thereby increasing their legitimacy and decreasing the dominance of the standard American and British English varieties.

== Translanguaging Spaces ==
In the context of translanguaging, when thinking about space, it is not necessarily considered a physical space, but more of a space in the multilingual individual's mind. Through the processes of translanguaging, individuals create their own translanguaging space. Having said that, there can be many different translanguaging spaces that then get incorporated into a larger social space. For example, a university environment may provide a better translanguaging space due to the greater diversity of students in college than in a typical high school – and this is referring to the individual's life outside the classroom. Moreover, multilinguals can generate this social space where they are free to combine whichever tools they have gathered— ranging from personal history, experience and environment, attitude, belief and ideology, cognitive and physical capacity— to form a coordinated and meaningful performance. Within the translanguaging space that has been formed, the isolation of each individual language is not present. Instead, it provides an environment where all languages merge and results in completely new ideas and practices.

Multilinguals, in their translanguaging space, are continually coming up with new strategies to take advantage of their language knowledge to attain a specific communication effect in their day-to-day lives and experiences. When they become comfortable with the use of each language, creativity can begin to flow, and the languages become intertwined in ways that can only be understood in that specific translanguaging space. For example, the mix of Spanish and English in Miami, Florida, leads to different translanguaging spaces. The variety among these spaces depends on the Latin country the speakers come from due to the difference in dialects that exist. It is very common to hear "Spanglish" being spoken in Miami but if someone speaks both Spanish and English, it does not necessarily mean the usage of certain expressions, words, and sentences will be understood.

Spanish as a second or foreign language connects translanguaging elements to facilitate understanding and a better communication process. Elements from various languages can be used to generate a more solid understanding of the ideas and make more meaning. Learners can express better answers by building knowledge from their primary language.

Multilingualism is a key component of the world. Recognizing the influence of cultural and linguistic elements of learning can enhance communication. Allowing space to use multiple languages to process information is critical. Learners can transfer knowledge from one language to another and build more understanding.

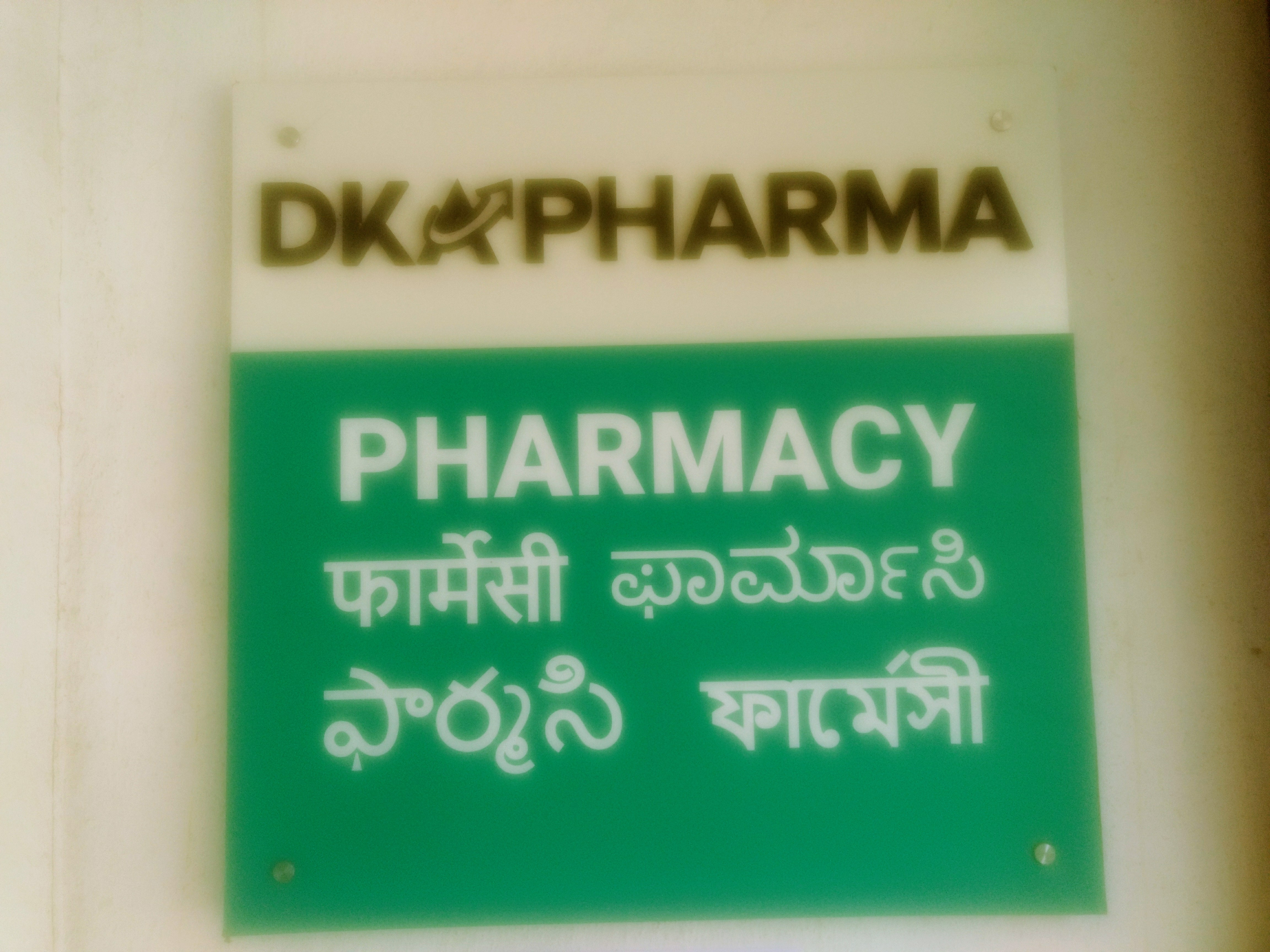
Multilingual sign in India

== Translanguaging Pedagogy ==
Translanguaging pedagogy demands that multilingual speakers engaging in translanguaging do not vacillate between language systems arbitrarily, but rather, that they do it with intention and a metacognitive understanding of the way their language practices work.

According to advocates, translanguaging promotes a deeper understanding of subject matter, by discussing in one language and writing in another. Students will always reference what they already know from their first language when working with a second language. This helps students process the information and improve communication in their second language. When introduced in a Welsh bilingual classroom, translanguaging meant that the input and output languages were often switched. In this type of setting, students are typically asked to read a text in one language and discuss it either orally or in written form in their second language. In the case of the Welsh classroom, the languages used were Welsh and English. This led to an increase of Welsh speakers in primary schools in 2007, with 36.5% of the students being able to speak Welsh, compared to 1987 when only 24.6% of students spoke Welsh.

The goal of including translanguaging as an aspect of second-language acquisition pedagogy is to move beyond sentence-level and grammatical concerns in second-language teaching strategies and to focus more heavily on discourse issues and on the rhetoric of communication. Students should be focused on the real applications of language that suit their purposes of communication based on the context in which they are communicating, rather than a one-variety-fits-all mode of learning language. Canagarajah determined that teachers should encourage students to use different languages in their writing and show them how to do it effectively by studying a Saudi Arabian student's essay writing and finding that she used different strategies like changing the context, expressing her own voice, interacting with others, and organizing her writing.

Some scholars writing within translanguaging pedagogy argue for a diversified conception of the English language, where the multiple varieties of English exist with their own norms and systems and all have equal status. Such a system is thought to enable a variety of communities to communicate effectively in English. In this conception of English language, it is treated as a heterogeneous global language wherein standard varieties of English such as Indian English, Nigerian English, and Trinidadian English have the same status as the orthodox varieties of British and American English. Reinforcing only one variety of English in academic situations may be disadvantageous for students, since students will ultimately encounter many varied communicative contexts, and as society becomes more digitally advanced, many of those communicative contexts will be transnational.

Since translanguaging is not yet a widely sanctioned language practice in educational systems, it is often practiced by students in secret and kept hidden from instructors. The practice of natural translanguaging without the presence of direct pedagogical effort can lead to issues of competence and transfer in academic contexts for students. This issue is why academics call for the inclusion of translanguaging in language acquisition programs, since students need to practice their translanguaging in a semi-structured environment in order to acquire competence and proficiency in communicating across academic contexts. If they are given the appropriate context in which to practice, students can integrate dominant writing conventions into their language practices and negotiate critically between language systems as they engage in translanguaging. For students to be successful at translanguaging in academic and other varied contexts, they must exercise critical metacognitive awareness about their language practices.

=== Teachers ===
Making use of translanguaging in the classroom does not require the teacher to be bilingual; however, it does require the teacher to be a co-learner. Monolingual teachers working with bilingual or multilingual students can successfully use this teaching practice; however, they must rely on the students, their parents, the community, texts, and technology more than the bilingual teacher, in order to support the learning and leverage the students' existing resources. As translanguaging allows the legitimization of all varieties, teachers can participate by being open to learning the varieties of their students and by incorporating words from unfamiliar languages into their own use, serving as a model for their students to begin working with their non-native languages.

The traditional prohibition of translanguaging in high-stakes writing assignments can prevent multilingual students from practicing their translanguaging abilities, and so it is the responsibility of the instructor to provide safe spaces for students to practice and develop their translanguaging skills. Teachers must plan out the translanguaging practices to be used with their students just as each lesson must be planned out, as translanguaging is not random. By reading bilingual authors and texts, teachers give the students the chance to experience two or more languages together and help compare and contrast the languages for the children.

Importantly, the use of translanguaging in the classroom enables language acquisition for the students without the direct insertion or influence of the teacher. While teachers do not need to become a compendium of the languages or language varieties practiced in their classrooms, they do need to be open to working with these new languages and language varieties to encourage student participation in translanguaging.

Language immersion programs can implement translanguaging as a technique to transform language learning. Educators can incorporate students' previous knowledge to encourage students to collaborate and make connections. Simultaneously, translanguaging can be implemented at home to allow students from multilingual families to connect words from another language to communicate better.

=== Higher Education ===
Many students will use translanguaging in higher education where they are attending a university that does not have their first language as the medium of instruction. The students use their multiple languages as resources in their learning and understanding of subjects and ideas. An environment of multiple languages spoken with various repertoires allows a greater multilingual competence of subjects taught and reviewed in each language available. Bilingual or multilingual students in higher education who study in their native tongue and the medium of instruction used at their institutions are studied to determine how to reform primary and secondary education. This creates room for discussion of primary and secondary school systems and their language(s) of instruction. Translanguaging in higher education has been seen mostly within North America and in the United Kingdom. There are certain countries that are accepting of multilingual policies, such as India. However, places such as the United Arab Emirates are not accepting of adopting languages into their school systems.

=== Language Comparisons ===
Grammatical structure, pronunciation, and word roots can be very similar across languages, making it easier to understand them by comparing languages to one another. Learners can compare and contrast the grammatical structure and sounds of new languages to known languages to build understanding. Translanguaging can also enhance lexical skills such as word naming and application as some cognates support comprehension and morphological understanding in different languages. For example, "water" in English is similar to "water" in Dutch, and "green" in English is like "groen" in Dutch. These similar words are not just found in languages with the same roots, like English and Dutch, but also in languages that have come into contact, like Spanish and Basque. For instance, "calle" in Spanish and "kalea" in Basque both mean "street." By recognizing these connections, teachers can help students learn languages more easily.

More examples:

English / Spanish

solid-sólido

liquid-líquido

gas-gaseoso

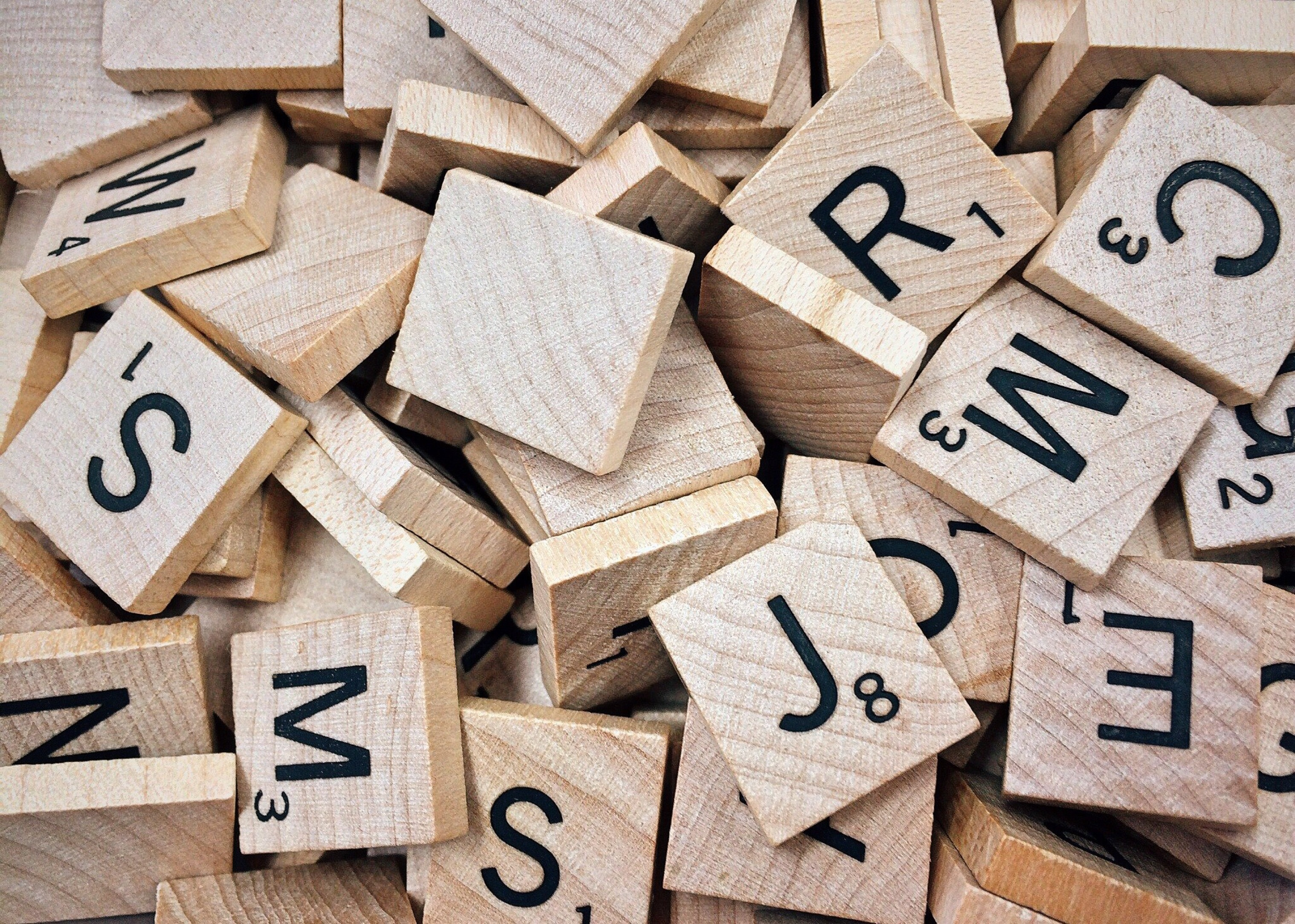
Using similarities in the alphabet from English and Spanish

=== Translanguaging and Collaborative Translation ===
Cognates

Using the first language to support the second language can benefit in numerous ways. Learners can connect their previous knowledge to their new learning. Additionally, technology can support the development and comprehension of multiple languages based on learning theories and strategies. This can also facilitate the visualization and interaction with grammar, pronunciation, and much of various languages simultaneously. According to Ofelia Garcia, translanguaging can contribute to education by:

Supporting students as they engage with and comprehend complex content and texts, providing opportunities for students to develop linguistic practices for academic contexts, making space for students’ bilingualism and ways of knowing, Supporting students’ bilingual identities and socioemotional development.

Collaborative translation can also contribute to translanguaging because many participants can translate simultaneously in the same document. This technique is fundamental because learners can utilize all the language knowledge, they have from their first, second or third language to input and expand knowledge in several areas.

=== Culture and Identity ===
The implementation of translanguaging can help preserve cultural heritage. Learners can recognize ways in which two languages are similar to support understandings of both languages, which can help them better understand and preserve their first languages.

García and Li affirm that using translanguaging helps students from diverse backgrounds to understand and express their identities. Bilingual people have complex language skills that can change, and translanguaging helps them show multiple identities, not just those from one language. Translanguaging reveals new ways of using language that show the complexity of communication between people with different backgrounds. This breaks away from fixed language identities tied to specific countries.

== Literature ==
There is a burgeoning body of Latino literature that features translanguaging acts as cultural markers and as aesthetic devices, including literary fiction and children's books. Immigrant and second-generation American authors feature translanguaging in their storyworlds, including Giannina Braschi, Susana Chavez-Silverman, and Junot Díaz. Braschi's translingual novel Yo-Yo Boing! (1998) offers many examples of translanguaging, code-switching, and liquidity, as well as Puerto Rican and Nuyorican dialectalisms (dar pon, vejigantes, chinas; ¡Ay, bendito!), all of which express a literary language and cultural markers. Yo-Yo Boing! demonstrates a metalinguistic awareness of translanguaging and the space between languages. The narrator states that “somos bilingües” (when she speaks of “barreras lingüísticas") and resorts to pseudo-phonetic writing to represent colloquialisms, in Spanish or English.

== See also ==
- Linguistic imperialism
- Raciolinguistics
- Translingualism
- Multilingualism
- Spanglish
