= Translingualism =

Aspects relevant across several languages

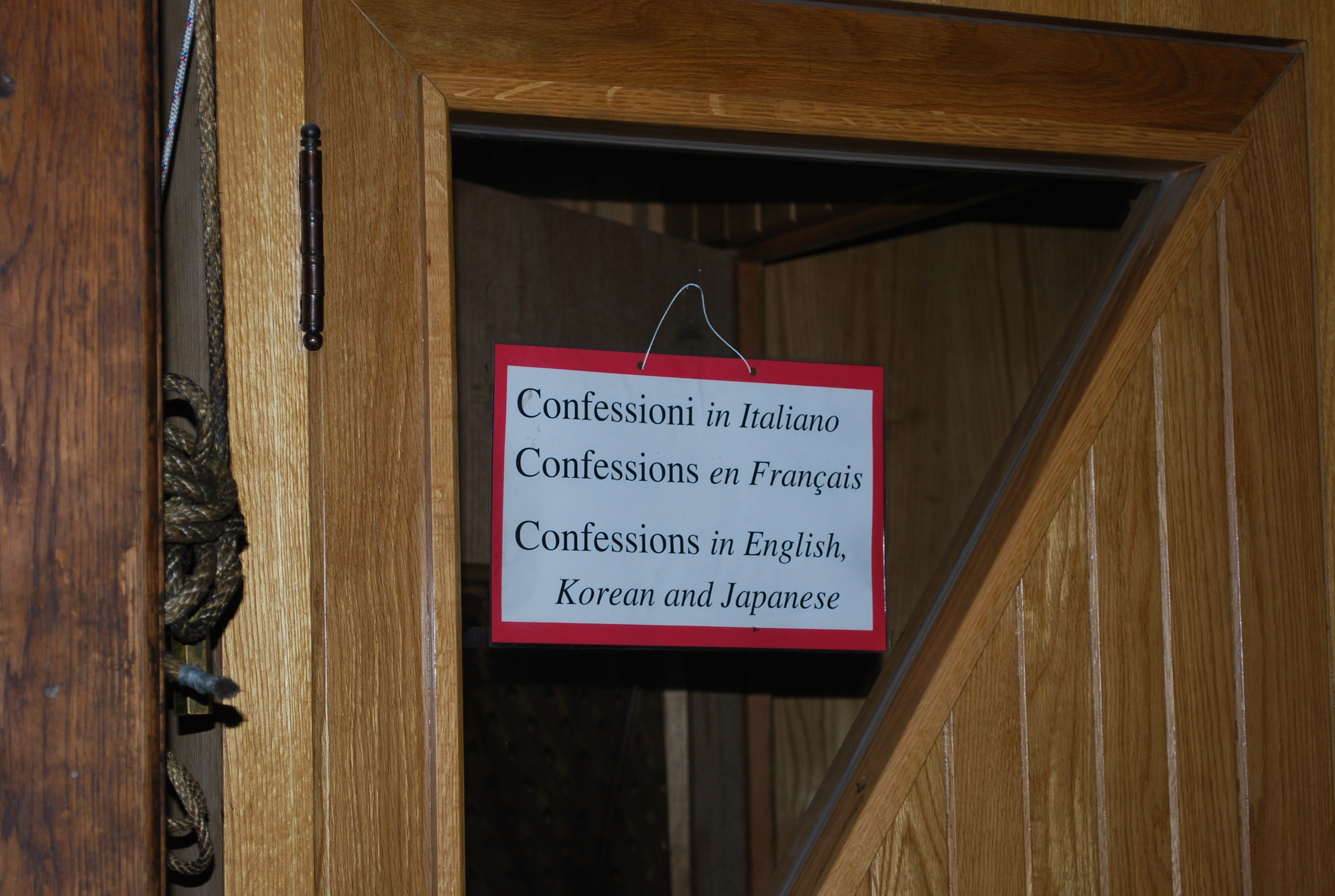
Example of translingualism

Translingual phenomena are words and other aspects of language that are relevant in more than one language. Thus "translingual" may mean "existing in multiple languages" or "having the same meaning in many languages"; and sometimes "containing words of multiple languages" or "operating between different languages". Translingualism is the phenomenon of translingually relevant aspects of language; a translingualism is an instance thereof. The word comes from trans-, meaning "across", and lingual, meaning "having to do with languages (tongues)"; thus, it means "across tongues", that is, "across languages". Internationalisms offer many examples of translingual vocabulary. For example, international scientific vocabulary comprises thousands of translingual words and combining forms.

The term also refers to a pedagogical movement and line of research inquiry in composition studies and second-language learning that seek to normalize the simultaneous presence of multiple languages and communicative codes as well as characterize all language use as a matter of mixing and changing these languages and codes. For these teachers and language researchers, the prefix trans in translanguaging "indexes a way of looking at communicative practices as transcending autonomous languages". This prefix provides a different lens of looking at languages and the relationships among them. Rather than considering each language as fixed and closed, a translanguaging perspective considers languages as flexible resources that speakers and writers use to communicate across cultural, linguistic, or contextual boundaries.

== History ==
Steven G. Kellman was among the first scholars to use the term translingualism in his 2000 book "The Translingual Imagination."[1996 collection Switching Languages: Translingual Writers Reflect on Their Craft.that book was 2003] This work presented that translingual writers are authors who write in more than one language or in a language other than their primary one in a way that emphasized freedom from cultural and monolingual restraint. The translingual writer is an author who has the ability to cross over into a new linguistic identity. While Kellman is simply among the first to use the term, the phenomena of translingualism may have emerged as a response to the Sapir-Whorf thesis of linguistic relativity.

In the early 21st century, TESL (Teaching English as a Second Language) began to use translingualism as a method of teaching a second language that focuses on unifying language use in defiance of monolingual approaches that treat languages as separate avenues of thought. Supporters of this use of translingualism focus on the liminality of language systems over concepts like "Standard Written English" and unaccented speech. The past decade, in fact, has seen a gradual increase in the number of second language scholars theorizing about translingualism. This suggests that a paradigm shift may be occurring in the way we think about language study, language teaching, and language use.

With respect to second-language teaching and research, translingual scholar Suresh Canagarajah has advocated approaches that merge the mother language with the target language. His argument is that the intimation behind speech and words is often more important that the words themselves and that tranlingualism's exploration of the liminal space between languages enables better comprehension and communication between parties.

Throughout history, there has often been a European and monolingual bias in regards to language. According to Wei, the attention given to linguistic innovation has primarily been given to languages such as English, Spanish, and French. Linguistic innovation in English can be accomplished by non native and native speakers alike. Over the years the English language has borrowed and mixed with other languages and these deviations created from non native speakers are often seen as "mistakes". The monolinguistic perspective views English as the "host" language and the other language as the "guest language" rather than treating them equally.

== Critical debates ==
The term translingualism presents the notion of fluidity between languages, rather than adhering to the static categorizations of bilingualism, multilingualism, ambilingualism, and plurilingualism. According to Tung-Chiou Huang, "Translingualism is a term from Steven G. Kellman (2000) and David Schwarzer et al. (2006), who see teaching an L2 as bridge building between languages that allow one to retain a unified mind and not be cloven into two for the sake of being multilingual." Supporters of this use of translingualism focus on the fluidity of language systems, thoroughly eschewing concepts such as "Standard Written English" and unaccented speech. The past decade, in fact, has seen a gradual increase in the number of second language scholars theorizing about translingualism toward a rhetoric of translingual writing. The paradigm of translingualism utilized in a classroom setting has not had much focus placed upon it, primarily due to its recent immergence into the SLA and ESL community. However, scholars such as Nathanael John Rudolph, are making the effort to research the adaptation of translingualism into pedagogical practices through the lens of ELT, particularly how translingual experiences can aid in the debates regarding native and non-native speaking roles and identities.

=== Dichotomy between native and non-native speakers ===
It is common for translinguals scholars to criticize a monolingual orientation to communication since it assumes that speakers should use a common language with shared norms in order to communicate effectively and successfully. Translanguaging and code meshing/switching contradict the discrete way of languages, but it also achieves less difficulties with communication.These standards originate from the native speaker's utilization of the language. Proponents of monolingual orientation believe that interlocutors should avoid mixing their own languages with other languages. However, Canagarajah states, "talk doesn't have to be in a single language; the interlocutors can use the respective languages they are proficient in." As of recently, there has been discussions among researchers of the idea of translingualism as a communicative competence. It states that learning the language used in a multilingual situation is not as important as creating clear communication. In today's global context, most scenarios involve speakers of various languages communicating primarily in English. These speakers will all have different cultural values which will affect their production and interpretation of speech and therefore the speakers will not adjust to any one language or culture but rather to the "common communicative arena". Canagarajah (2013), for instance, identifies translinguals as speakers who demonstrate the ability to use their language(s) successfully across diverse norms and codes in response to specific contexts purposes.

The "translingual fluency" of a writer is determined by their literary works' ability to engage and stimulate a geographically and demographically varied audience. Readers, on the other hand, demonstrate their translingual fluency by being attuned and perceptive to a work's linguistic heterogeneity.

=== Translingual education ===
Translingual education encompasses classes as a whole learning a new language together and speaking multiple languages, or a monolingual student adjusting and learning their second language in a new classroom. This can mean the instruction of English in European schools to prepare students to adjust to the globalization of the world or accommodating a Spanish speaking student in an American classroom. According to Wlosowicz it is the "planned and systematic use of two languages inside the same lesson", but can also apply to more than two languages which are spoken dynamically.

Multilingual education can be beneficial for students in bringing language awareness and valuing diverse languages. According to Cenoz and Gorter, there has been a worry for people in Europe learning English that their national language would not be used in a scientific and technical standpoint. Although, many classes are taught translingual in Europe for students’ future to increase international mobility/communication and learn to respect others’ cultures/identities. Education is growing in schools that have originally been monolingual and more often students are speaking multiple languages at home.

According to several scholars, language teaching and testing practices can strive for improvement so that multilingualism is better represented over the usual dominance of the native speaker model (of English). There is room for innovation and creativity among translingual students that can be acted on. As stated by Campbell, strategies that help students with their proficiency in both languages include reading instructions in one language and producing work in the other, or summarizing texts from one language into the other. Indicators of proficiency in language include accuracy as well as dexterity and resourcefulness. In the realm of translingual creativity Campbell also advocates for spaces of linguistic negotiation and a multimodal process (using several ways to communicate a message such as text, images, audio, etc.).

Teaching translingual can be difficult in that it needs to be very personalized and requires an instructor with multilingual proficiency. Although, a multilingual learner's language awareness can be helpful in learning the new language by understanding the key differences between L1 (student's first language) and L2 (student's second language). Translingualism is important in that it views language differences as resources rather than deficits, otherwise known as code meshing which blends codes into the same environments.

== See also ==
- Interlingual homograph
- Interlinguistics
- Translanguaging
