= Ofelia García (educator) =

Educator and academic known for translanguaging education

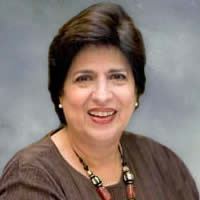
- Citizenship: Cuban/American
- Occupation: Professor Emerita
- Spouse: Ricardo Otheguy
- Awards: Honorary Doctorate of Humane Letters, Bank Street Graduate School of Education (2016); Charles Ferguson Award in Applied Linguistics (2017)

Academic background
- Education: Hunter College; CUNY Graduate Center

Academic work
- Institutions: CUNY Graduate Center
- Website: https://ofeliagarciadotorg.wordpress.com/

Ofelia García (Otheguy) is Professor Emerita in the Ph.D. programs of Latin American, Iberian, and Latino Cultures (LAILAC) and Urban Education at Graduate Center of the City University of New York. She is best known for her work on bilingualism, translanguaging, language policy, sociolinguistics, and sociology of language. Her work emphasizes dynamic multilingualism, which is developed through "an interplay between the individual’s linguistic resources and competences as well as the social and linguistic contexts she/he is a part of." Rather than viewing a bilingual's languages as autonomous, García views language practices as complex and interrelated, as reflecting a single linguistic system.

== Biography ==
García, originally from Havana, Cuba, migrated to the United States, specifically New York, at the age of 11. It is through this experience that she developed her interest in bilingual education and its impact on society.

García received her undergraduate, graduate, and Ph.D. degrees from colleges of the City University of New York. She also obtained two Post-Doctoral Fellowships, one from the Yeshiva University, New York City Sociology of Language and Bilingualism, and another one from the University of Michigan, Ann Arbor Institute of Political and Social Science Research.

Prior to joining the faculty of the Graduate Center, García held a number of different positions in education at a variety of prestigious institutions, including Dean of the School of Education at the Brooklyn Campus of Long Island University, Professor of Bilingual Education at the Teachers College, Columbia University, and Professor of Education and Co-Director of the Center for Multiple Languages and Literacies at City College of New York.

García is married to linguist Ricardo Otheguy.

In March 2022 she was amongst 151 international feminists signing Feminist Resistance Against War: A Manifesto, in solidarity with the Russian Feminist Anti-War Resistance. (Note: This manifesto was criticized by both Ukrainian feminists and members of the Feminist Anti-War Resistance themselves.)

== Research ==
García has dedicated her career to the field of bilingualism and bilingual education. García is known for popularizing usage of the term translanguaging which she defines as "the deployment of a speaker's full linguistic repertoire without regard for watchful adherence to the socially and politically defined boundaries of named (and usually national and state) languages." García met Cen Williams, who coined the term, in North Wales in 2012. Both driven by social and language conscience and passionate about language and bilingual education, they agreed on extending the concept of translanguaging from classroom usage to encompass the everyday language of bilinguals.

== Awards ==
García has been recipient of multiple awards including:

- 2008 Gladys Correa Award from the New York State Association of Bilingual Education.
- British Association of Applied Linguistics Book Award (2014) for the volume Translanguaging: Language, Bilingualism and Education.
- Honorary Doctorate of Humane Letters, Bank Street Graduate School of Education (2016). García was recognized as a "distinguished research scholar, outstanding practitioner, outspoken advocate, influence on public policy and opinion, champion for equity and democracy, special impact on children through the arts and the media."
- Charles Ferguson Award in Applied Linguistics (2017). This award honors people who have outstanding scholarship, superior leadership skills, and the ability to foster collaborations among a wide range of people to enrich the world around them.
- Lifetime Career Award from the Bilingual Education Special Interest Group (BER SIG) of the American Education Research Association (AERA) (2017).
- Appointed Member of the National Academy of Education (2018).
- Excellence in Mentoring Award, CUNY Graduate Center (2018). The purpose of this award is to publicly recognize the values of the Graduate Center and the people that represent them.
- Leadership through Research Award (Lifetime Achievement) from the Second Language Research Special Interest Group (SLR SIG) of the American Educational Research Association (AERA) (2020)
- Elected member of the American Academy of Arts and Sciences (2023)

== Books ==
- Fishman, J. A., & García, O. (2010). Handbook of language & ethnic identity. Oxford University Press.
- García, O. (2009). Bilingual education in the 21st century: A global perspective. John Wiley & Sons.
- García, O., & Baker, C. (2007). Bilingual education: An introductory reader. Multilingual Matters.
- García, O., Flores, N., & Spotti, M. (2021). The Oxford handbook of language and society. Oxford University Press.
- García, O., Johnson, S. I., Seltzer, K., & Valdés, G. (2017). The translanguaging classroom: Leveraging student bilingualism for learning. Caslon.
- García, O., & Kleyn, T. (2016). Translanguaging with multilingual students: Learning from classroom moments. Routledge.
- García, O., Lin, A., & May, S. (2017). Bilingual and multilingual education. Springer International Publishing.
- García, O., & Menken, K. (2010). Negotiating language policies in schools: Educators as policymakers. Taylor & Francis.
- García, O., Peltz, R., & Schiffman, H. F. (2006). Language loyalty, continuity and change: Joshua A. Fishman's contributions to international sociolinguistics. Multilingual Matters.
- García, O., Torres-Guzmán, M. E., & Skutnabb-Kangas, T. (2006). Imagining multilingual schools language in education and glocalization. Multilingual Matters.
- García, O., & Wei, L. (2014). Translanguaging: Language, bilingualism and education. Palgrave Pivot.
