= Plurilingualism =

Ability to switch between languages

Plurilingualism is a term imported from French. In French academic culture, it is defined as the ability of a person who can competently use more than one language and switch between multiple languages depending on the situation for ease of communication. It is not a common term in everyday native English. Plurilingualism is different from code-switching in that plurilingualism refers to the ability of an individual to use multiple languages, while code-switching is the act of using multiple languages together. Plurilinguals practice multiple languages and are able to switch between them when necessary without much difficulty. Although plurilingualism is derived from multilingualism (also referred to as bilingualism), there is a difference between the two. Multilingualism is connected to situations wherein multiple languages exist side-by-side in a society but are utilized separately. In essence, multilingualism is the coexisting knowledge of separate languages while plurilingualism is the interconnected knowledge of multiple languages. In general, plurilinguals have had contact with languages not native to them through educational institutions, however the education system plays only a small role in the linguistic competence of these individuals. Learning a second language is thought to stimulate someone's plurilingualism.

== Definition and use ==
Plurilingualism was first equivalent to multilingualism when referencing plurilingual communities, where multiple languages were spoken in a community. However, a distinction of plurilingualism was necessary to differentiate individual and society. Plurilingualism was used to focus on the individual as the agent in the interaction of languages since multilingualism was societal contact of languages.

Plurilingualism does not necessarily mean a person is fluent in multiple languages, it means that a person can interchange more than one language with each other when a situation calls for it. A person is considered competent in plurilingualism when they can speak in one language while understanding another; and can switch between languages when appropriate and/or necessary. According to the Council of Europe, plurilingualism can also be used to mediate conflict between those with no common language. Researchers have even gone so far as to say that being able to understand different dialects and/or regional versions of one language opens the door for someone to be plurilingual. People who are plurilingual tend to have better communicative sensitivity, creativity, and metalinguistic awareness. The knowledge of multiple languages as well as the understanding of different cultures allows for the improved communicative skills. The advantages of plurilingualism seem to become greater the more languages someone learns.

== Second language learners ==
Historically during the formal learning of a second language, it has been common practice to maintain a clear division between the first and second language. The division involves not speaking the first language while learning the second, as well as avoiding any reference to the elements of the first language. By not referencing the first language, instructors hope to develop in their students the same control of the language that native speakers have. This separation, referred to as a hard boundary, contrasts the soft boundary that comes with a plurilinguistic approach. An integrated curriculum, which utilizes the soft boundary, contrasts the different languages that are being taught and highlights the similarities and differences between the two.

== Plurilingual education ==
Plurilingual education has been an increasing form of education in Europe. It was first introduced to the education system in 1996, along with the idea of pluriculturalism. According to the Council of Europe, it is imperative that students learn to be plurilinguists from a young age so that they can be not only be more competitive in an increasingly globalized world, but also be able to integrate within societies when necessary. The founding principles of plurilingual education are the acceptance of cultural diversity, the right to use one's mother tongue as a form of communication, the right to gain experience and knowledge of another language, the acceptance that language is the core of human dialogue. One of the few things plurilingual education promotes is "an awareness of why and how one learns the language one has chosen, a respect for the plurilingualism of others and the value of languages and varieties irrespective of their perceived status in society, and a global integrated approach to langue education in the curriculum."

Plurilingual education developed in the European Union due to the multilingual and multicultural communities throughout the European Union. Other multilingual countries are beginning to use plurilingual education as well. Canada implements plurilingual education due to the increasingly multilingual society. The Canadian education system is utilizing the Common European Framework of Reference for Languages as a basis for their plurilingual education. Asian countries that are highly multilingual are also considering plurilingual education. South Asian countries have many mother-tongues, however economies and societies may be based on another language. Plurilingual education benefits the individuals of such countries by gaining functional competency in multiple languages for specific social situations and pluricultural competence.

== Pluricultural competence ==
Pluricultural competence is a consequence of plurilingualism. Pluricultural competence, on a basic level, is the understanding of several cultures. Rather than learning an additional language or culture, it is transforming the current knowledge as a whole. Language and culture are interconnected, by learning a language an understanding of the culture is also gained. However, plurilingualism and pluricultural competence are not separately distinguished understandings of language and culture. As plurilingualism is the complex, hybrid understanding of multiple languages that build to form a larger understanding, pluricultural competence is the same. The ability to comprehend and utilize culture in different situations is a valuable skill for individuals in multilingual societies. Depending on the social factors impacting a plurilingual at a time, their pluricultural competence is able to be altered to best adapt. Being plurilingual and having pluricultural competence allows the speaker to choose words and phrases that best describe the situation, which would not be possible without having a blended context of both languages and cultures.

== See also ==
- Interlanguage
- Polyglotism
- Multilingualism
- Code-switching
- Translanguaging
- Translingualism
