= Cremaster =

Cremaster is a term derived from the Greek verb κρεμάννυμι = "I hang (transitive)", not from Latin cremare = "to burn". It may refer to:

- The cremaster muscle, part of genital anatomy in human males
  - Cremaster reflex, a reflex in the muscle
- A hook-shaped protuberance from the rear of certain chrysalis casings
- The Cremaster Cycle, a 1994–2002 art project by Matthew Barney
