= Place-based education =

Educational philosophy

Place-based education, sometimes called pedagogy of place, place-based learning, experiential education, community-based education, environmental education or more rarely, service learning, is an educational philosophy. The term was coined in the early 1990s by Laurie Lane-Zucker of The Orion Society and Dr. John Elder of Middlebury College. Orion's early work in the area of place-based education was funded by the Geraldine R. Dodge Foundation. Although educators have used its principles for some time, the approach was developed initially by The Orion Society, a Massachusetts-based nonprofit organization, as well as Professor David Sobel, Project Director at Antioch University New England.

Place-based education seeks to help communities through employing students and school staff in solving community problems. Place-based education differs from conventional text and classroom-based education in that it understands students' local community as one of the primary resources for learning. Thus, place-based education promotes learning that is rooted in what is local—the unique history, environment, culture, economy, literature, and art of a particular place—that is, in students' own "place" or immediate schoolyard, neighborhood, town or community. According to this pedagogy, grade school students often lose what place-based educators call their "sense of place" through focusing too quickly or exclusively on national or global issues. This is not to say that international and domestic issues are peripheral to place-based education, but that students should first have a grounding in the history, culture and ecology of their surrounding environment before moving on to broader subjects.

Place-based education is a multidisciplinary approach to education which draws from a variety of purposes and practices, including experiential learning, contextual learning, problem-based learning, constructivism, outdoor education, democratic education, multicultural education, service learning, personalized learning, and more. It aligns with several popular pedagogies, including thematic, hands-on, and project-based learning. Place-based curriculum begins with topics or issues from the local community.

== History ==
In his introduction to the first book specifically focused on the pedagogy, Place-Based Education: Connecting Classrooms and Communities, Laurie Lane-Zucker describes the context within which place-based education was developed:

In an increasingly globalized world, there are often pressures for communities and regions to subordinate themselves to the dominant economic models and to devalue their local cultural identity, traditions and history in preference to a flashily marketed homogeneity. Furthermore, at a time when industrial pollution, biodiversity/habitat loss, and aquifer depletion are becoming widespread and acute, such pressures often exacerbate the problems by encouraging unsustainable patterns of consumption and land use, and by weakening familial and community relationships that are deeply tied to the local environment. A process of disintegration occurs as basic connections to the land fray and communities become less resilient and less able to deal with the dislocations that globalization and ecological deterioration bring about. A community's health—human and more-than-human—suffers.

The path to a sustainable existence must start with a fundamental reimagining of the ethical, economic, political and spiritual foundations upon which society is based, and this process needs to occur within the context of a deep local knowledge of place. The solutions to many of our ecological problems lie in an approach that celebrates, empowers, and nurtures the cultural, artistic, historical and spiritual resources of each local community and region, and champions their ability to bring those resources to bear on the healing of nature and community.

Schools and other educational institutions can and should play a central role in this process, but for the most part they do not. Indeed, they have often contributed to the problem by educating young people to be, in David Orr's words, 'mobile, rootless and autistic toward their places.' A significant transformation of education might begin with the effort to learn how events and processes close to home relate to regional, national, and global forces and events, leading to a new understanding of ecological stewardship and community. This, I believe, supports the propagation of an enlightened localism—a local/global dialectic that is sensitive to broader ecological and social relationships at the same time as it strengthens and deepens peoples sense of community and land.

Place-based education might be characterized as the pedagogy of community, the reintegration of the individual into her homeground and the restoration of the essential links between a person and her place. Place-based education challenges the meaning of education by asking seemingly simple questions: Where am I? What is the nature of this place? What sustains this community? It often employs a process of re-storying, whereby students are asked to respond creatively to stories of their homeground so that, in time, they are able to position themselves, imaginatively and actually, within the continuum of nature and culture in that place. They become a part of the community, rather than a passive observer of it.

== Examples of Place-Based Learning ==
- A thematic approach can be combined with place-based learning using tourism as a theme. Students research current and historical tourism sites in their community. They analyze how sites are advertised and examine how the impressions of visitors are influenced or how stereotypes of a place are created. The impact of tourism on the environment can be examined. With this approach, learning becomes interdisciplinary, combining social studies, media literacy, language arts, and the sciences. A final project could be creating new promotional materials or volunteering to preserve historical or environmental sites.
- Examining local food using an interdisciplinary, place-based approach can create a new awareness of the unique historical and current tradition in one's community. Students can explore their own unique food traditions, local agriculture and its impact on employment or the environment, or local food deserts. Projects might include the creation of community cookbooks, events showcasing the local food traditions, school gardens, or service projects for local food banks.
- Think Global School combines place-based learning with project-based learning as part of its Changemaker Curriculum. Students live and learn in four countries per year, engaging in projects that incorporate social, cultural, economic, and environmental factors relevant to the places they visit. The projects include conversations with locals, expert guest speakers, and other members of the community.
- The Cottonwood School of Civics and Science in Portland, Oregon is a place-based school that through service, integrated curriculum and experiential learning, provides opportunities for students to actively build relationships locally. Examples include on-going restoration efforts in near-by natural areas, creating exhibits for local cultural museums, and researching and proposing policy-based solutions to community problems.
- Students embarking upon a unit about the Vietnam War might interview veterans of that war, collecting their stories for a radio-spot, newspaper article or educational brochure. In this case, the use of local people to support students' learning would not only lead to greater comprehension of the Vietnam War, but also to understanding more about the history of their community and the people in it.
- Juniper Hill School for Place-Based Education in Alna, Maine uses place-based education to connect children to themselves, to each other, and to their communities through studying both natural and human environments. All activities Juniper Hill's students engage in at the school are integrated into the local landscape and community.
- Bowen Island Community School on Bowen Island, British Columbia, lends itself to in-depth environmental learning experiences by joining students and members of the community together to foster real-life learning experiences, on and off the school grounds. For example, while studying government, a grade 4/5 class visited the local municipality and got to ask questions. While studying earth materials, a geologist from the community came to the school, and lead students on a beach walk to look at different rock types.
- Cal Poly Humboldt in Arcata, California offers several "Place-Based Learning Communities" (PBLCs) for first-year students. These communities group students by their similar majors and interests, introducing them to the local environment and ecosystems, Indigenous history, and university life through themed activities and academic mentoring. Activities include field trips, meeting faculty and guest speakers, and learning about professional life in one's chosen major or interest.
- Fairview Elementary School in Columbia, Missouri is the first placed based school in Missouri. One focus of the program is teaming up with The University of Missouri College of Agriculture, Food and Natural Resources, the school will engage with Fairview students through service learning activities. They will continue to grow the already impressive impact students in the district have made in helping remove invasive species, such as honeysuckle, in nearby parks. In the partnership, the community impact made by students can be built on. The place-based approach connects what students are learning in the curriculum with their community as well as their environments across all subjects. Lessons are not complete without real-world images. One reason teachers who incorporate place-based learning like it, is because students are able to engage with the subject matter differently and it becomes part of their schema.

Saseenos Elementary and Sangster School, both in Sooke, British Columbia, have introduced "Nature Kindergarten" programs. The pedagogies in these schools are rooted around a deep connection to place, specifically the old-growth forest and beach that surround the school. Each morning, rain or shine, the kindergarten students are led out into the forest by two instructors. Their task is to explore, to observe, and to connect, with the environment around them. It is hoped that the students will develop a lifelong connection to nature, which will lead them in turn to become responsible and passionate stewards of the land. A strong focus on the history of Indigenous people on the land is also incorporated into the program. These nature kindergartens are modelled on the Scandinavian nature schools. This would be considered land-based education with a heavy focus on Indigenous content and perspective aligned with environmentally sustainable practices. Land-based education is different from place-based education because the latter does not focus on Indigenous content or perspectives.

== See also ==
- Critical pedagogy of place
- Learning environment
- Learning space
