= Pluriculturalism =

Aspect of identity politics

Pluriculturalism is an approach to the self and others as complex rich beings which act and react from the perspective of multiple identifications and experiences which combine to make up their pluricultural repertoire. Identity or identities are the by-products of experiences in different cultures and with people with different cultural repertoires. As an effect, multiple identifications create a unique personality instead of or more than a static identity. An individual's pluriculturalism includes their own cultural diversity and their awareness and experience with the cultural diversity of others. It can be influenced by their job or occupational trajectory, geographic location, family history and mobility, leisure or occupational travel, personal interests or experience with media. The term pluricultural competence is a consequence of the idea of plurilingualism. There is a distinction between pluriculturalism and multiculturalism.

Spain has been referred to as a pluricultural country, due to its nationalisms and regionalisms.

== See also ==
- Multiculturalism
- Cultural diversity
- Interculturalism
- Intercultural communication
- Polyethnicity
