= Critical pedagogy of place =

Critical pedagogy of place is a curricular approach to education that combines critical pedagogy and place-based education. It started as an attitude and approach to place-based and land-based education (both largely considered under the umbrella of environmental education) that criticized place-based education's invisible endorsement of colonial narratives and domineering relationships with the land. The scholars critiquing place-based education mainly focused on re-centering Indigenous (and other marginalized) voices in the curriculum. In the early 1990s, C.A. Bowers advocated for a critical pedagogy of place that acknowledged our enmeshment in cultural and ecological systems, and the resulting need for this to figure in the school curriculum. In 2003, David A. Greenwood (formerly Gruenewald) introduced and defined the term "Critical Pedagogy of Place." In the years since, the general ideas of critical pedagogy of place have been incorporated into many scholars' critiques of place-based, land-based, and environmental education.

== Precedents ==
=== Indigenous and land-based approaches ===
At the center of critical pedagogy of place is the critique that land-based education and place-based education have largely ignored the narratives of Indigenous peoples and conceived of humans as mainly separate from nature. For example, stories of eco-heroes such as the Grizzly Man and Into the Wild's main character, Chris, center on humans attempting to overcome, or conquer, nature. Scholars focusing particularly on Indigenous perspectives argue that land-based education and place-based education should instead more fully consider Indigenous ideologies that incorporate humans as part of nature. In order to do this, the colonial constructs inherent within place- and land-based education must be dismantled. In particular, land- and place-education focused on areas settled by non-Indigenous peoples need to better incorporate the decolonization of the land and work to better center Indigenous narratives. This process can be best facilitated by focusing on disrupting the settler colonial narrative in modern contexts, considering land and Indigenous cosmologies in curriculum, and recognizing the significance of naming places and the land rights of Indigenous peoples.

Calderon argues that, incorporating a sense of place informed by Indigenous narratives renders the settler colonialism visible. Resulting academic research has illustrated these theoretical underpinnings in a variety of ways. First, scholars have worked to map the path of colonialism in history and its resulting impacts on marginalized groups, thus rendering it visible. McCoy worked to create a map of the rise of the Manifest Destiny ideology in Virginia. Both Paperson and Sato analyzed settler colonialism by mapping the stories of marginalized groups, thus re-centering the narrative history.

Second, scholars have worked to illustrate how dismantling the colonialism inherent in land- and place-based education can improve environmental education's effectiveness. In 2014, Whitehouse et al. examined Australian environmental education and demonstrated how the program both holds up colonialist ideals and incorporates Aboriginal knowledge bases. Meyer, also in 2014, did a similar study with a Hawaiian environmental education program that incorporated local Indigenous perspectives. Bang et al., in their work with Native Americans in the U.S., described how a critical land-based perspective can center environmental education for marginalized people. Working from the perspective of African communities, Mauro et al. describes how a local-centered approach can create a more impactful educational experience.

=== C.A. Bowers ===
Working in the same tradition of critique, C.A. Bowers focuses on critical pedagogy of place's emphasis on the inclusion of humans within the ecological system. Bowers argues that we cannot base environmental education efforts on the individual because we are nested within culture, which is in turn nested within ecosystems. We are, therefore, inevitably influenced by the culture through which we view the world—we view the world through our subconscious cultural habits. With respect to land- and place-based education, this means that they are, therefore, born out of a Western tradition that has ideals in contrast to many local, Indigenous cultures. This sets up an educational approach that is in opposition to nature and instead focuses on monetary profit over community. This results in our ignoring both the ecological crisis and the intergenerational local knowledge that might help us solve it.

He was to later respond to David A. Greenwood's theory of a critical pedagogy of place (see below) by arguing that a critical pedagogy of place, in an attempt to decolonize spaces, actually encodes many of the same (universalist) assumptions that also undergird our consumer-dependent world. It ignores the long history of culturally specific inhabitation. He says that the idea of decolonization is a universalizing idea that is in direct opposition to the tenets of local and place-specific knowledge inherent in place-based education:

To reiterate, the key reason that a critical pedagogy of place is an oxymoron is that the linguistic tradition of relying upon abstractions, including abstract theories that encode many of the same taken-for-granted assumptions that underlie both the idea of universal decolonization and the market liberals' efforts to universalize the West's consumer dependent lifestyle, fail to take account of the intergenerational traditions of habitation that still exist in communities. Places have a long and culturally varied history, while the language of a critical pedagogy of place has a specific history that carries forward the tradition of ignoring the diverse ways in which more ecologically centered cultures and community practices have contributed to long-term habitation of place.

=== David A. Greenwood ===
David A. Greenwood is the first scholar to capitalize Critical Pedagogy of Place. He writes that Critical Pedagogy of Place seeks to combine critical pedagogy's emphasis on challenging "assumptions, practices, and outcomes taken for granted in dominant culture and in conventional education" with place-based education's focus on helping students become citizens that understand their actions "might have some direct bearing on the well-being of the social and ecological places people actually inhabit."

Greenwood argues that, in the process of raising students' sense of awareness and consciousness of power structures, critical pedagogy often neglects the idea that "human culture has been, is and, always will be nested in ecological systems. Because of its focus on oppressed groups, critical pedagogy focuses mainly on social and urban contexts. While this emphasis on raising consciousness is important as a pathway to change, Greenwood argues that it needs to be balanced with place-based education, which emphasizes the direct social and ecological places in which the students actually live out their lives. Thus, he emphasizes the sense of urban as a place, a concept previously missing from critical pedagogy. In order to actualize critical pedagogy, he argues, we cannot forget that the urban space is also a crucial part of critical pedagogy.

However, place-based education is often criticized for not having a strong theoretical underpinning. Scholars question the purpose of teaching about local place—what does it actually achieve for the students? Therefore, in turn, critical pedagogy offers place-based education a rich theoretical grounding with its significant history rooted in critical theory. Greenwood suggests that, as a curriculum with goals of social change, this moral grounding is necessary.

As a result of combining these two pedagogies, Greenwood suggests two goals for a critical pedagogy of place: decolonization and reinhabitation. In order to decolonize a place, Greenwood suggests that we must "identify and change ways of thinking that injure and exploit other people and places" (6). Educators can begin this process by helping students unlearn dominant narratives and instead learn about more socially just and sustainable ways of living in the world. This also means reinvigorating non-dominant cultural patterns and traditions. By reinhabitation, Greenwood means that a critical pedagogy of place must seek to teach students how to live in a place that has endured historical exploitation, both socially and ecologically. In order to do this, students must begin to understand how "living well" differs geographically and culturally while simultaneously beginning to understand how many diverse cultures live in a global society. Then, students will begin to understand "what cultural patterns should be conserved or transformed to promote more ecologically sustainable communities."

These two goals challenge both place-based and critical pedagogy educators to "expand the scope of their theory, inquire, and practice to include the social and ecological contexts of our own and others ‘ inhabitance." This emphasize creates a pedagogy that is a place of praxis for both ecological and social transformation.

== Current approaches ==
=== Post-modern directions ===
Recent scholarship in this field has taken a post-modern perspective on a critical pedagogy of place, calling for the changing of social imaginaries that not only better complicate the relationship between humans and nature, but also focus on a pluralistic view of the world. This includes an increased need to be reflexive and create locally defensible pedagogy, rather than a universalistic pedagogy that is not flexible enough to be re-situated for local communities. This begins, McKenzie argues, with the focus on the intersubjective, or the personal and community-based, experiences of education as much as the sensory or thought-based experiences.

=== Incorporation of Greenwood ===
Greenwood's ideas have been both incorporated into research on environmental education, as well as being applied to other critical education approaches. Kayira, in 2015, used Greenwood's guiding questions of "'What happened here?' 'What is happening here now and in what direction is this place headed?' and 'What should happen here?'" to examine an African-centered approach to environmental education. Madden used the curricular approaches Greenwood outlines to suggest pedagogical pathways to Indigenous education. Barnhardt does a similar exploration with Indigenous knowledges in Alaska. Working to build theory, Ardoin et al. and McInerney et al. examined the scale of place and how place and identity interact in critical pedagogy of place. Writing to practitioners, Martusewicz wrote a book, EcoJustice Education: Toward Diverse, Democratic, and Sustainable Communities that gives practical examples of how to implement Greenwood's theories into practice. Chinn uses Greenwood's ideas to design a teacher training aimed at decolonizing pedagogy

Greenwood's theories have also been applied to other education approaches (early childhood curriculum, art education, social studies, and globalizing).

=== Classroom science education ===
The problematization of land- and place-based education has recently transferred to a critical examination of science education in schools. Starting from the premise that epistemological orientations impact memory organization, ecological reasoning, and the perceptions of humans in nature, Bang and her colleagues examined how students navigate multiple beliefs in community-based science education. First, they examined the differences between Menominee Native American children and European American children and found that Menominee children were more likely to mention ecological connections and closeness to nature, and were more likely to mimic animals. Using this information, they re-centered the curriculum to include multiple ways of knowing and designed a science curriculum that relied on multiple senses of community, rejected deficit thinking, celebrated heterogeneous sense-making and expanded definitions of nature. Examination of the program led the researchers to suggest that having a diversity of perspectives in science results in more effective science education.
