= Supplemental instruction =

Supplemental instruction (SI) is an academic support model that uses peer learning to improve university student retention and student success in high-attrition courses. Supplemental Instruction is used worldwide by institutions of higher learning. SI is also called "Peer-Assisted Study Sessions," "PASS" or "SI-PASS" in parts of Africa, Europe, North America, and Oceania. According to an article in the peer-reviewed journal, Research and Teaching in Developmental Education, "Since its introduction in 1974 at the University of Missouri-Kansas City by Deanna C. Martin, Supplemental Instruction (SI) has been implemented, studied, and evaluated for its effectiveness across a variety of disciplines and institutional levels." The article further noted that for some students,

"SI is a program that works. Since SI is an enrichment program designed to target high risk courses, it takes the emphasis off the individual student's projected performance. A high risk course, as defined repeatedly in the literature, is any course (usually entry-level) in which unsuccessful enrollment (percentages of D's and F's as final grades and rates of withdrawal from the course and/or institution) exceeds 30%."

== Peer Learning Using the SI Model ==
Supplemental Instruction differs from other types of student support, such as tutoring:

"Typical learning center programs operate on a drop-in basis, offering services primarily designed to address the needs of high-risk students. Staff devote a high percentage of time to one-on-one tutorial instruction, with basic skills courses and workshops complementing individual services."

Unlike tutoring, SI is attached to the course and not the student: "This approach focused not on 'at risk students,' but rather on 'at risk classes,' entry-level classes in health sciences, and later in general arts and sciences classes." According to Martin and Arendale, Supplemental Instruction "provides regularly scheduled, out-of-class, peer-facilitated sessions that offer students an opportunity to discuss and process course information." An SI program organizes peer support through an "SI leader," who is typically a student who succeeded in the particular academic course (e.g., Organic Chemistry, Economics 101, Algebra II). SI leaders

"attend the course lectures where they take notes and complete assigned readings. The specialists also schedule and conduct three or four, fifty-minute SI sessions each week at times convenient to the majority of students in the course. Student attendance is voluntary. Individual attendance by participants ranges widely from one to twenty-five hours, and averages 6.5 hours per semester. The leader is presented as a 'student of the subject.'"

The use of trained SI leaders rather than professors, lecturers, PhDs, MDs or other credentialed experts allows the service to scale up quickly to large numbers of students and for a large variety of courses at the undergraduate, graduate, and professional-school levels. The SI model evolved during the 1970s and 1980s from its beginnings at a single "Student Learning Center" at the University of Missouri-Kansas City. Supplemental Instruction expanded globally in the 1990s: Higher-education institutions around the world have adopted some variant of the UMKC Supplementary Instruction model. Some attribute this widespread diffusion to the SI model and to its founders.

"Early on, SI’s founders decided that the SI model should be modified by its users rather than its creators. Martin and Blanc ... argue that SI should be 'fluid rather than rigid, dynamic rather than static.'"

Hundreds of institutions around the world implement some variant of SI, PASS or SI-PASS. Hundreds of scholarly articles have studied and extended the Supplemental Instruction model since the 1970s. Supplemental Instruction programs are frequently in the news.

== Video Supplemental Instruction ==
With the widespread use of consumer video products in 1980s, Deanna Martin, Robert Blanc, and their colleagues applied video to Supplemental Instruction sessions for students who hadn't previously benefited from SI, such as student athletes. Video Supplemental Instruction (VSI) allows the SI leader to play back a lecture at a rate tailored to the particular group of students.

"In VSI courses, instructors record their lectures on video tape and enroll students in a video section of the same course that they teach live on campus. For students in the VSI section, a trained facilitator [VSI leader] uses the taped lectures to regulate the flow of information to the learner. The lectures are stopped and started as needed, allowing the facilitator to verify that students have comprehended one idea before moving on to the next."

In contrast to non-video Supplemental Instruction in which one lecture is always matched with one class, VSI starts with a video-recorded lecture that SI leaders then use to lead discussions in one or more SI classes, as was done for teaching basic sciences for medical board certification exams: Martin and Arendale subsequently reported that the "VSI method has been used with salutary effect by two dozen different medical schools and health-care institutions, preparing people to perform well on medical boards." For many learner, however, VSI offers advantages that SI lacks:

"The foregoing should not be interpreted to suggest that SI is a one-size-fits-all solution to academic problems. Data suggest that the SI experience can move a student’s performance from below average to average, from average to above average, from above average to excellent. In the lower ranges of performance, it appears that participation in SI can elevate a student’s grade from sub-marginal to below average. At UMKC as at other Universities, however, practitioners have found that there are students for whom SI offers insufficient support. Typically, these students fall at or near the bottom of the fourth quartile in terms of entry level scores and/or high school rank. SI is not scheduled often enough, nor does it have sufficient structure, breadth, or depth to meet the needs of this population. On other campuses, these students would typically be tracked into developmental courses which, for UMKC, has never been an option."

Thus, the population of students taking SI is stratified with some being unsuccessful in SI; "a more intense and sustained experience was needed for the least academically prepared students," namely, VSI.

== Philosophy ==
From its inception, the goal of SI has been equity in higher education:

“Supplemental Instruction (SI) was created at the University of Missouri-Kansas City (UMKC) in 1973 as a response to a need at the institution created by a dramatic change in the demographics of the student body and a sudden rise in student attrition ... Gary Widmar, Chief Student Affairs Officer, hired Deanna Martin, a then-doctoral student in reading education, in 1972 to work on a $7,000 grant from the Greater Kansas City Association of Trusts and Foundation to solve the attrition problem among minority professional school students in medicine, pharmacy, and dentistry.”

Also from the start, Martin's SI programs were driven by practical results: A successful SI program will show statistically significant drops in attrition in the classes that have SI services. Supplemental Instruction was also supposed to be cheap: What Martin and her collaborators sought was "an academic support service that would be both cost-effective and successful in reducing the high rates of student attrition." To be cost effective: Typically, "student SI leaders can be assigned to the program from the work study program.

Thus, SI was founded to be a cheap and effective means to reduce attrition and thereby improve equity in higher-education graduation rates. Smith and MacGregor see Supplemental Instruction (PASS or SI-PASS) as a cooperative learning approach. Although the founders of Supplemental Instruction were influenced by Piaget and Karplus, as SI spread across the world, the founders encouraged adaptation to local circumstances and change when needed.

== Effectiveness ==
In the early 1990s, the U.S. Department of Education validated three specific claims about the effectiveness of SI:

1. Students participating in SI within the targeted high-risk courses earn higher mean final course grades than students who do not participate in SI. This finding is still true when analyses control for ethnicity and prior academic achievement.
2. Despite ethnicity and prior academic achievement, students participating in SI within targeted high-risk courses succeed at a higher rate (withdraw at a lower rate and receive a lower percentage of [fail] final course grades) than those who do not participate in SI.
3. Students participating in SI persist at the institution (reenroll and graduate) at higher rates than students who do not participate in SI

A more recent review of all published SI research between 2001 and 2010 found studies in support of all three of these claims, and no studies contradicting them.

== Dissemination ==
The International Center for SI is located at the University of Missouri-Kansas City in Kansas City, Missouri within Academic Support and Mentoring, formerly the Center for Academic Development. The International Center for SI hosts and conducts regular trainings on the SI model and has trained individuals representing more than 1,500 institutions in 30 different countries.

There are national centers for SI at the University of Wollongong, Australia, the University of Guelph, Canada, Nelson Mandela University, South Africa, Lund University, Sweden. There is also a Regional Center for SI in northern South Africa at North West University. SI may also be called PASS (peer assisted study sessions) and PAL (peer assisted learning). Each national center is responsible for supervision and training interested institutions in their region in the SI model.

== Conferences ==
Every two years, the International Center for SI hosts a conference where administrators, educators, SI leaders, and students gather to share new research and ideas that pertain to SI.

== Adaptations ==
The name "Supplemental Instruction" has been changed to better fit into other variations of the English Language. For example, "the University of Manchester engages students as partners in two established Peer Support programs: Peer Mentoring and Peer Assisted Study Sessions (PASS)," which is "Based on the Supplemental Instruction model."

== Criticisms ==
There has been criticism and debate concerning self-selection bias when measuring SI outcomes in non-experimental settings: A. R. Paloyo of the University of Wollongong noted that "we expect the selection-bias term to be nonzero, implying that the observed difference in, say, final marks is not equal to the effect of SI because it is contaminated by self-selection. Good final marks can be expected from motivated students, but motivation is also positively correlated with participation in SI."

Based on their study of students enrolled in a Mathematics course at the Ethembeni Community College in Port Elizabeth, South Africa, Koch and Snyders concluded that a lecture that is adapted to the student may have at least as good outcomes as Video Supplementary Instruction; in the study, one adaptation was longer lecture times in the professor's class that matched the time spent in VSI; the authors conceded that VSI has at least one advantage: "Although experienced lecturers might be still preferable to VSI, these results may have positive implications for distance learning in the absence of enough experienced lecturing or teaching staff_{'} especially in rural areas."

== See also ==
- Academic coaching
- Academic tutoring
- Peer-mediated instruction
- Peer Leadership Program
- Study skills
- The First Year Experience Program
