= Eli Review =

- Developer(s): Drawbridge, Inc
- Platform: Internet
- Type: Educational
- Website: elireview.com

Eli Review is a web-based service that provides instructors with tools to facilitate peer learning through the three primary activities in the writing process: writing, review, and revision. Its main theoretical basis is a concept associated with Lev Vygotsky known as the zone of proximal development, or instructional scaffolding, where learners build confidence and skill through working with a more capable peer and with the guidance of an experienced teacher or mentor. It was originally developed at Michigan State University, and functioned for several years in the MSU community before commercialisation in 2011.
