= Peer-led team learning =

Peer-led team learning (PLTL) is a model of teaching undergraduate science, math, and engineering courses that introduces peer-led workshops as an integral part of a course. Students who have done well in a course (for instance, General Chemistry) are recruited to become peer-leaders. The peer-leaders meet with small groups of six to ten students each week, for one to two hours, to discuss, debate, and engage in problem solving related to the course material.

== History ==
PLTL originated at the City College of New York in the early 1990s as part of an effort to address the low success rate of students in General Chemistry. Peer-led Workshops were incorporated into the teaching of General Chemistry by reducing the amount of lecture to three hours from four hours. Preliminary results at City College of New York and other collaborating institutions indicated improved student attitudes and performance in General Chemistry and other courses.

These early results led to further study and development of PLTL by a national team, which produced a Guidebook for PLTL. A nationwide dissemination effort promoted broader adoption of key PLTL components across science, mathematics, and engineering courses. A review of research on PLTL and related peer-led learning formats found that studies from over twenty institutions showed an average 15% increase in ABC grades among initially enrolled students compared to traditional lectures, with key studies in Chemistry, Biology, Computer science, Engineering, and other disciplines. PLTL leadership received the James Flack Norris Award for Outstanding Achievement in Teaching Chemistry in 2008.

== Theory ==
PLTL can be understood in the context of cognitive science. It is consistent with social constructivism and ideas of Vygotsky in that students are asked to construct their own understanding with guidance from a more capable peer. They can be said to be learning within the zone of proximal development.

Evaluation of successful implementations of suggest that PLTL has six critical components:

1. PLTL is integral to the course.
2. Peer-leaders are trained in leadership skills.
3. Faculty are involved.
4. Materials for workshops are challenging and promote collaborative effort.
5. Space and noise level acceptable for group discussion and work.
6. PLTL is integrated into the institutional structure.

== See also ==
- Peer education
- Peer feedback
- Peer learning
- Peer mentoring
- Peer tutor
- Peer-mediated instruction
