= LDL (disambiguation) =

An LDL is a low-density lipoprotein, a biochemical.

LDL or LdL may also refer to:

- Learning by teaching (German: Lernen durch Lehren, LdL), in pedagogy
- Loudness discomfort level in hyperacusis
- LDL decomposition, in linear algebra
