= Studyhall =

Former US-based online education startup

- Industry: Peer learning
- Founded: September 2012
- Headquarters: Washington, D.C.
- Website: studyhall.com

Studyhall was an online education startup based in Washington, DC, United States.

== History ==
The company founded by Washington University School of Law graduate Ross Blankenship in 2012. Studyhall.com officially launched in September 2012 at the TechCrunch Disrupt conference in San Francisco, where the company was a Startup Battlefield Finalist.

The company launched as a peer-to-peer learning platform that allowed students in higher education to collaborate through virtual spaces. Students could create Studyhall.com accounts by providing the platform with their .edu email addresses. Studyhall members would add their classes to their profile each semester, and were connected to other students in the same courses. Other student groups were also able to communicate with Studyhall.com’s group forum pages. Students were notified of other members’ activity on the website through updates on their account homepage.

Studyhall.com accounts had a word processing feature for members to record, share, and organize class notes. Each account had video-chat capability for interactive study sessions, in which notes could be shared between two members on a collaborative “whiteboard.”
