= Keith Topping (disambiguation) =

Keith Topping (born 1963) is a British screenwriter.

Keith Topping may also refer to:

- Keith James Topping (born 1947), British researcher
- Keith Topping (American football) (1912–1974), American football player
