= Eurolinguistics =

Study of the languages of Europe

Map of major European languages

Eurolinguistics is a neologistic term for the study of the languages of Europe. The term Eurolinguistics was first used by Norbert Reiter in 1991 (German equivalent: Eurolinguistik). Apart from a series of works dealing with only a part of the European languages, the work of Harald Haarmann pursues a "pan- or trans-European perspective". This goal is also pursued by Mario Wandruszka.

Typological questions have mainly been dealt with by the Eurolinguistischer Arbeitskreis Mannheim (ELAMA; led by Per Sture Ureland) and the EUROTYP projects. Important sources of linguistic data for Eurolinguistic studies are the Atlas Linguarum Europae (for vocabulary studies) and the World Atlas of Linguistic Structures (Haspelmath et al. 2005, for grammar studies).

The internet platform EuroLinguistiX (ELiX) (edited by Joachim Grzega) offers a bibliography of Eurolinguistic publications as well as a wiki, a discussion forum, an academic internet journal in order to address also aspects of "linguistic and cultural history", "sociology of languages", "language politics" and "intercultural communication". In 2006, Joachim Grzega published a basic reader on common features of European languages.

Also joint with the ELAMA, the EuroLSJ project by Erhard Steller tries to collect essential results of Eurolinguistics and make them usable for everyday life in Europe by transforming them into a representative standard language (LSJ European / Europé LSJ) which wants to serve as an optimized "acquisition and memory helper" (Giuseppe G. Castorina) for a quicker and easier access to all languages of Europe.

== Common features of European languages ==
=== Writing systems ===
(Sources and further information for this section: Haarmann 1991, Grzega 2006)

Writing was introduced to Europe by the Greeks, and from there also brought to the Romans (6th century BC). There are four alphabets in regular use in the areas generally considered Europe. The Latin alphabet was developed into several scripts. In the early years of Europe, the Carolingian minuscules were the most important variety of the Latin script. From this two branches developed, the Gothic/Fracture/German tradition, which Germans used well into the 20th century, and the Italian/Italic/Antiqua/Latin tradition, still used. For some nations the integration into Europe meant giving up older scripts, e.g. the Germanic gave up the runes (Futhark) (3rd to 17th centuries), the Irish the Ogham script (4th to 7th centuries). The Cyrillic script is the second most widespread alphabet in Europe, and was developed in the 9th century under the influence of the Greek, Latin and Glagolitic alphabets. Both the Latin and Cyrillic alphabets are used for multiple languages in multiple states, both inside and outside Europe. As well as these two, there are two alphabets used primarily for a single language, although they are occasionally applied to minority languages in the states from which they originate. The oldest of these alphabets is the Greek alphabet, which could be considered the progenitor of all the surviving alphabets of Europe, with the earliest recorded inscriptions appearing in the 9th century BC. The other is found in the Caucasus, originating in the 5th century. The Georgian alphabet is used primarily to write Georgian, though it is also used to write the other Kartvelian languages, Svan, Mingrelian and Laz, all of which are found largely within the borders of Georgia.

=== Sound features ===
(Sources and further information for this section: Haarmann 1973, Asher 1994, Price 1998, Grzega 2006)

The sound systems of languages may differ considerably between languages. European languages can thus rather be characterized negatively, e.g. by the absence of click sounds. One could also think of specific prosodic features, such as tonal accents. But there are also tonal languages in Europe: Serbo-Croatian (e.g. lètī ‘he flies, is flying’ with long rising accent vs. lêta ‘years’ with long falling accent) and Slovene (e.g. sûda ‘of the vessel’ with long falling accent vs. súda ‘of the court’ with long rising accent). In Slovene, the use of the musical accent is declining (cf. Rehder 1998: 234) but there are hardly any contexts where intelligibility is endangered. In Sweden Swedish (but not in Finland Swedish) there also is a pitch accent in some words, which can be meaningful, e.g. ´anden ‘the duck’ vs. ˇanden ‘the ghost, spirit’.

=== Grammatical features ===
(Sources and further information for this section: Asher 1994, Price 1998, Haspelmath 2001, Heine/Kuteva 2006)

As a general introductory remark, a distinction can be made between three structural types of languages:

- isolating (i.e. grammatical/sentence functions are expressed through analytic means and relatively strict word-order rules, e.g. the strict S-V order rule in English),
- agglutinating (i.e. grammatical/sentence functions are expressed through affixes, with one affix expressing exactly one function) and
- inflecting (i.e. grammatical/sentence functions are expressed through affixes, with one affix expressing several functions).

European languages are seldom pure representatives of one type. For (a) Modern English is a good example (and in many ways the code oral of French verbs); for (c) Old English and Modern High German are good examples (and in many ways the code écrit of French verb forms); classical representatives of type (b) are Finnish and Hungarian. If a language is not isolating, this does not necessarily mean that it has no word-order rules. Latin, Basque, Finnish and the Slavic languages have a relatively free word order, whereas many languages show more restricted rules. German and Dutch, e.g., show verb-second word-order in main clauses and verb-final order in subordinate clauses. English has subject-verb word-order, which is also preferred by the Romanic languages. Irish and Scottish Gaelic have a basic verb-initial word order.

A distinction can also be made between analytic constructions (with free grammatical morphemes, i.e. grammatical elements as separate words) and synthetic constructions (with bound grammatical morphemes, i.e. grammatical elements attached to or included in a word), e.g. the house of the man vs. the man's house.

Apart from the points already mentioned, the categories of aspect (not always easy to separate from the tense system) and gender are noteworthy. Under the category of aspect linguists basically understand the distinction between perfective actions (activity finished, has led to a result; single event) and imperfective actions (activity not yet finished, w/out information on termination; long duration, repetitive). The Slavic languages have a fine and rigid aspect system; in English there's the distinction between progressive and non-progressive (simple) and a distinction between present perfect and past; in the Romanic languages the imperfect serves to denote background actions.

The most current gender systems in Europe are twofold (masculine vs. feminine, e.g. in the Romanic languages, or uter vs. neuter, e.g. in Swedish and Danish); but there are also languages that are threefold (e.g. Slavic, German) or lack grammatical gender at all (e.g. English, Hungarian, Finnish). The problem of gender also concerns the system of personal pronouns. Typically, a distinction is made between three persons singular and three persons plural, but there are also some languages that have specific words for the dual (e.g. Slovene). In the 3rd person singular there is often a distinction according to grammatical gender; in English, though, the choice is determined by natural gender; in Hungarian and Finnish there is no differentiation at all, while in Scandinavian languages there is a differentiation that incorporate both grammatical and natural gender. In some languages the grammatical gender is also relevant in the 3rd pl. (e.g. the Romance languages).

Whereas languages are traditionally grouped according to linguistic genealogy, a more modern way is to look at grammatical features from a synchronic point of view. A certain number of common structural features would then characterize a sprachbund. For Europe, one of the most prominent proposed sprachbunds is referred to as Standard Average European (SAE) or the Charlemagne sprachbund. Haspelmath (2001) illustrates that German, Dutch, French, Occitan and Northern Italian are the most central members of this sprachbund. Important features are (cf., e.g., Haspelmath 2001, Heine/Kuteva 2006):

1. the distinction between an indefinite and a definite article
2. the formation of relative clauses, which are positioned after the (pro)noun concerned and are introduced by a variable relative pronoun
3. a past tense construction with "to have"
4. a passive voice construction that shows the object of the action in the syntactic position of the subject and that uses the past participle in connection with an auxiliary
5. a specific suffix for the comparative

=== Vocabulary ===
(Sources and further information for this section: Haarmann 1975, Haarmann 1993, Paczolay 1997, Panzer 2000, Görlach 2002)

Latin, French and English not only served or still serve as linguae francae (cf. below), but also influenced the vernacular/national languages due to their high prestige. Due to this prestige, there are not only "necessity loans", but also "luxury loans" and pseudo-loans. Many loans from these three languages (esp. Neo-Latin with its Greek elements) can be considered internationalisms, although occasionally the meanings vary from one language to another, which might even lead to misunderstandings. Examples:

- Lat. forma: e.g. Fr. forme, It. Sp. Cat. Cz. Slovak. Serbo-Croat. Slovene Maltese Hung. Pol. Latv. Lith. forma, Dan. Swed. E. Du. vorm (shape) and form (aerobic endurance), Romansh furma, G. Form, Ir. foirm
- Fr. restaurant, e.g. E. Du. Norw. Cat. Romansh restaurant, G. Restaurant, Swed. restaurang, Pg. restaurante, Sp. restaurante, It. ristorante, Cz. restaurace, Slovak reštaurácia, Slovene restavracija, Latv. restorâns, Lith. restoranas, Estn. restoran, Pol. restauracja, Serbian restoran, Maltese ristorant/restorant
- E. manager, e.g. Du. Norw. Swed. Icel. Fr. Sp. Cat. It. Romansh manager, G. Manager, Finn. manageri, Pol. menadżer, Serbo-Croat. menadžer, Lith. menedžeris, Hung. menedzser, Maltese maniġer

Three minor source languages for European borrowings are Arabic (esp. in mathematics and science, foreign plants and fruits), Italian (esp. in arts, esp. from the 15th to the 17th centuries), and German (esp. in arts, education, mining, trading from the 12th to the 20th centuries with varying importance).

As far as the structuring or "wording" of the world is concerned changes occur relatively fast due to progress in knowledge, sociopolitical changes etc. Lexical items that seem more conservative are proverbs and metaphorical idioms. Many European proverbs and idioms go back to antiquity and the Bible; some originate in national stories and were spread over other languages via Latin. A typical European proverb to express that there is no profit without working can be paraphrased as "Roasted pigeons/larks/sparrows/geese/chickens/birds don't fly into one's mouth", e.g.:

- Bavarian: Gibroutna Taubn fliagn oan et ins Maul (pigeon)
- Czech: Pečení holubi nelétají do huby (pigeons)
- Danish: Stegte duer flyve ingen i munden (pigeon)
- Dutch: De gebraden duiven vliegen je niet in de mond (pigeons)
- English: He thinks that larks will fall into his mouth roasted
- Finnish: Ei paistetut varpuset suuhun lennä (sparrows)
- French: Les alouettes ne vous tombent pas toutes rôties dans le bec (larks)
- Standard German: Gebratene Tauben fliegen einem nicht ins Maul (pigeon)
- Hungarian: Senkinek nem repül a szájába a sült galamb (pigeon)
- Latvian: Cepts zvirbulis no jumta mutē nekrīt (sparrow)
- Lithuanian: Keptas karvelis neatlėks pats i burną (pigeon)
- Norwegian (Nynorsk): Det kjem ikkje steikte fuglar fljugande i munnen (birds)
- Polish: Pieczone gołąbki nie przyjdą same do gąbki (pigeons)
- Serbo-Croatian: Pečeni golubovi ne lete u usta (pigeons)
- Slovak: Nech nik nečaká, že mu pečené holuby budú padať do úst (pigeons)
- Slovene: Pečeni golobje ne lete nobenemu v usta (pigeons)
- Swedish: Stekta sparvar flyger inte in i munnen (sparrows)

=== Communicative strategies ===
(Sources and further information for this section: Axtell 1993, Collett 1993, Morrison et al. 1994, Hickey/Stewart 2005, Grzega 2006)

In Geert Hofstede's terms Europe can, to a large extent, be considered an individualistic civilization (i.e. a rather direct and analytic style is preferred, important points are mentioned before an explanation or illustration in an argument, decisions are based on compromise or majority vote); in contrast, the Sinic (Chinese), Japanese, Arabic and Hindu (Indian) civilizations are collectivistic (i.e. a rather indirect and synthetic style is used, explanations and illustrations are mentioned before the essential point of an argument, decisions are reached through consent). Edward Hall's distinction further distinguishes between "low context" communication (i.e. direct style, person-oriented, self-projection, loquacity) and "high context" communication (i.e. indirect style, status-oriented, reservation, silence). Most European nations use "low context" communication.

==== Some specific features of European communication strategies ====
- The mostly reciprocal use of address terms (this is different in Slavic and Asian civilizations, for totally different reasons). Status seems to play a less important role than in the Sinic, Korean, and Japanese civilizations. Communication between the sexes is absolutely normal in Europe, whereas it is traditionally very rare in the Arabic civilization. A dual system of pronouns is used in the vast majority of European languages: Romance, such as French, or Spanish (which also exists in Argentina, Uruguay, Guatemala [vos vs. usted], German, Slavic languages [e.g. Russ. ty vs. vy]; it has also been said that the American dialect form y'all is/was occasionally used as a formal address pronoun: see y'all). There are also tendencies in the nominal series of address terms, which distinguish Europe from other civilizations. In private, Europeans nowadays quickly agree to address each other by the first name; but in business communication, one should first use the correct title, even if a change toward less formal addressing may occur quite rapidly. Titles are definitely more important in the Hindu, Arabic, Sinic and Japanese civilizations; in the Slavic civilization nicknames are frequently used in all kinds of private and informal conversation — especially in Slavic Orthodox countries, such as Russia. Nicknames are sometimes also used in informal and social situations among close friends and associates in the Americas (North and South/Latin), but to a somewhat lesser extent.
- Many salutation terms in Europe (cf. especially Spillner 2001) include wishes for a good time of the day, for health (or a question whether somebody is in good health), for success or for luck. The common Arabic and Asiatic wish for peace, though, is rare in European civilization; an exception is the formal ecclesiastical Latin Pax tecum/vobiscum. Note that many European salutation phrases are frequently (at least in informal situations) very much reduced on a phonetic level, which is not so much the case in Arabic, Hindu (Indian), Sinic (Chinese) and Japanese civilizations.
- Frequent small talk topics are traveling, soccer (and other international sports disciplines), hobbies, the entertainment industry and the weather. In contrast, sexuality, death, religion, politics, money or class, personal issues and swearing are generally tabooed. Any racial, ethnic, sexist and cultural biased comments are shunned and morally opposed in Europe (and all developed countries) more than anywhere else. In Hindu, Arabic, Sinic and Japanese civilization people are frequently asked about their family (in Arabic civilization, however, this excludes the wife; even the word "wife" is compared to the "F" word in English-speaking countries). Due to their status-oriented nature, people from the Far East civilizations often ask for "administrative form" information, especially in Japan.
- Among Europeans (includes the Americas and Australia) and sometimes east Asians (esp. in Japan), a "thank you" is expected and welcomed in quite a number of situations (perhaps the most in Great Britain and North America), whereas South Asian and Middle Eastern people use the phrase in a more economical way and often content themselves with simple looks of thanks; on the other hand, other non-western civilizations (e.g. Polynesians of the South Pacific and Native American tribes) have rather extended formulae of thanks.
- With requests (cf. especially Trosborg 1995 and Cenoz/Valencia 1996), the bare imperative is normally avoided in favor of devices such as questions, modal auxiliaries, subjunctive, conditional, special adverbs. The exchange of verbal stems, which is found in Japanese and Sinic languages, is not a part of (Indo-)European languages.
- When somebody has to say no, this is normally accompanied by some form of apology or explanation. In the civilizations of the Far East and many Native American tribes in North America, the formal equivalents for "no" are unacceptable and/or tabooed in general.
- Apologies are necessary with face-threatening acts or after somebody has intruded into somebody else's private sphere—which is bigger and thus more easily violated in North America and Asia than in Europe and bigger in Europe (esp. the British Isles) than in Latin America and the Arab nations, and the concept of privacy and apology is universal, but varies from northern/western, eastern/Slavic and southern/Mediterranean countries (cf. especially Trosborg 1995).
- By comparing the national descriptions by Axtell (1998) and Morris et al. (1979), one can conclude that in Europe one can safely make compliments about somebody's clothes and appearance, meals and restaurants, voluntary offerings, a room's equipment.

== Linguae Francae ==
(Sources and further information for this section: Haarmann 1975, Haarmann 1993, Grzega 2006)

Three linguae francae are prominent in European history:

- (Medieval and Neo-) Latin: Gradually declined as a lingua franca since the late Middle Ages, when the vernacular languages gained more and more importance (first language academy in Italy in 1582/83), in the 17th century even at universities. This effect was weaker in the Vatican.
- French: From the times of Cardinal Richelieu and Louis XIV, c. 1648 (i.e. after the Thirty Years' War, which had hardly affected France, thus free to prosper), till the end of World War I, c. 1918.
- English

Linguae francae that were less widespread, but still played a comparatively important role in European history are:

- Mediterranean Lingua Franca (11th to 19th centuries), which gave its name to the phenomenon; it was a commercial pidgin based on Italian with contributions from other languages around the Mediterranean Basin.
- Provençal (Occitan) (12th to 14th centuries, due to the troubadour poetry)
- Middle Low German (14th to 16th centuries, during the heyday of the Hanseatic League, particularly in Northern and Northeastern Europe.)
- Russian (19th and 20th centuries, in eastern and central Europe as a result of domination by the Russian Empire and Soviet Union)

The first type of dictionary was the glossary, a more or less structured list of lexical pairs (in alphabetical order or according to conceptual fields). The Latin-German (Latin-Bavarian) Abrogans was among the first of these. A new wave of lexicography can be seen from the late 15th century onwards (after the introduction of the printing press, with the growing interest in standardizing languages).

== Language and identity, standardization processes ==
(Sources and further information for this section: Haarmann 1975, Haarmann 1993, Grzega 2006)

In the Middle Ages the two most important definitory elements of Europe were Christianitas and Latinitas. Thus language—at least the supranational language—played an elementary role. This changed with the spread of the national languages in official contexts and the rise of a national feeling. Among other things, this led to projects of standardizing national language and gave birth to a number of language academies (e.g. 1582 Accademia della Crusca in Florence, 1617 Fruchtbringende Gesellschaft, 1635 Académie française, 1713 Real Academia de la Lengua in Madrid). "Language" was then (and still is today) more connected with "nation" than with "civilization" (particularly in France). "Language" was also used to create a feeling of "religious/ethnic identity" (e.g. different Bible translations by Catholics and Protestants of the same language).

Among the first standardization discussions and processes are the ones for Italian ("questione della lingua": Modern Tuscan/Florentine vs. Old Tuscan/Florentine vs. Venetian > Modern Florentine + archaic Tuscan + Upper Italian), French (standard is based on Parisian), English (standard is based on the London dialect) and (High) German (based on: chancellery of Meißen/Saxony + Middle German + chancellery of Prague/Bohemia ["Common German"]). But also a number of other nations began to look for and develop a standard variety in the 16th century.

== Linguistic minorities ==
(Sources and further information for this section: Stephens 1976, Price 1998, Ahrens 2003, Grzega 2006)

Despite the importance of English as an international lingua franca in Europe, Europe is also linguistically diverse, and minority languages are protected, e.g. by the European Charter for Regional or Minority Languages founded in the 1990s. This underlines that the popular view of "one nation = one language" (cf. Wirrer 2003) is mostly false.

A minority language can be defined as a language used by a group that defines itself as an ethnic minority group, whereby the language of this group is typologically different and not a dialect of the standard language. For several years now, Jan Wirrer has been working on the status of minority languages in Europe (cf., e.g., Wirrer 2000 and 2003). In Europe—e.g. thanks to the European Charter of Regional and Minority Language—some languages are in quite a strong position, in the sense that they are given special status, such as Basque, Irish, Welsh, Catalan, Rhaeto-Romance/Romansh and Romani, native language of the Roma/Gypsies in southern Europe), whereas others are in a rather weak position (e.g. Frisian, Scottish Gaelic, Turkish, Sámi, Sorbian/Wendish and Yiddish, the once common language of Ashkenazi Jews in Eastern Europe). Especially non-indigenous minority languages are not given official status in the EU.

Some minor languages don't even have a standard yet, i.e. they have not even reached the level of an ausbausprache yet, which could be changed, e.g., if these languages were given official status. (cf. also next section).

== Issues in language politics ==
(Sources and further information for this section: Siguan 2002, Ahrens 2003, Grzega 2006)

France is the origin of two laws, or decrees, concerning language: the Ordonnance de Villers-Cotterêts (1239), which says that every document in France should be written in French (i.e. not in Latin nor Occitan) and the French Loi Toubon, which aims at eliminating Anglicisms from official documents. But a characteristic feature of Europe is linguistic diversity and tolerance, which is not only shown by the European Charta of Regional and Minority Languages. An illustrative proof of the promotion of linguistic diversity in the Middle Ages is the translation school in Toledo, Spain, founded in the 12th century (in medieval Toledo the Christian, Jewish and Arab civilizations lived together remarkably peacefully).

This tolerant linguistic attitude is also the reason why the EU's general rule is that every official national language is also an official EU language. However, Letzebuergish/Luxemburgish is not an official EU language, because there are also other (stronger) official languages with "EU status" in that country. Several concepts for an EU language policy are being debated:

- one official language (e.g. English, Interlingua, or Esperanto).
- several official languages (e.g. English, French, German, Spanish + another topic-dependent language).
- all national languages as official languages, but with a number of relais languages for translations (e.g. English or Esperanto as relais languages).
- New immigrants in European countries are expected to learn the host nation's language, but are still speaking and reading their native languages (i.e. Arabic, Hindi, Mandarin Chinese, Swahili and Tahitian) in Europe's increasingly multi-ethnic/multicultural profile.

== Select bibliography ==
- Wolfgang Abbe et al.: Bibliographie Europäische Sprachwissenschaft, 50 vols. Hamburg: Loges 2011.
- Rüdiger Ahrens (ed.): Europäische Sprachenpolitik / European Language Policy, Heidelberg: Winter 2003.
- R. E. Asher et al. (eds.): The Encyclopedia of Language and Linguistics, Oxford: Pergamon 1994.
- Roger Axtell: Do's and Taboos Around the World, White Plains: Benjamin 1993.
- Andrea Brendler / Silvio Brendler: Europäische Personennamensysteme: Ein Handbuch von Abasisch bis Zentralladinisch, Hamburg: Baar 2007.
- Jasone Cenoz / Jose F. Valencia: 'Cross-Cultural Communication and Interlanguage Pragmatics: American vs. European Requests', in: Journal of Pragmatics vol. 20 (1996): p. 41-54.
- Peter Collett: Foreign Bodies: A Guide to European Mannerisms, London: Simon & Schuster 1991.
- Gyula Décsy: Die linguistische Struktur Europas: Vergangenheit – Gegenwart – Zukunft, Wiesbaden: Harrassowitz 1973.
- Manfred Görlach (ed.), English in Europe, Oxford: Oxford University Press 2002.
- Joachim Grzega: EuroLinguistischer Parcours: Kernwissen zur europäischen Sprachkultur, Frankfurt: IKO 2006, ISBN 3-88939-796-4 (most of the information presented here is a summary of this book—the book was positively reviewed by Norbert Reiter here and by Uwe Hinrichs here)
- Joachim Grzega: Europas Sprachen und Kulturen im Wandel der Zeit, Tübingen: Narr 2012.
- Joachim Grzega (ed.): The Routledge Handbook of Eurolinguistics, London: Routledge 2025.
- Harald Haarmann: Soziologie und Politik der Sprachen Europas, München: dtv 1975.
- Harald Haarmann: Universalgeschichte der Schrift, 2nd ed., Frankfurt (Main)/New York: Campus 1991.
- Harald Haarmann: Die Sprachenwelt Europas: Geschichte und Zukunft der Sprachnationen zwischen Atlantik und Ural, Frankfurt (Main): Campus 1993.
- Martin Haspelmath: "The European Linguistic Area: Standard Average European", in: Martin Haspelmath et al. (eds.), Language Typology and Language Universals, vol. 2, p. 1492–1510, Berlin: de Gruyter 2001.
- Martin Haspelmath et al. (eds.): The World Atlas of Language Structures, Oxford: Oxford University Press 2005.
- Bernd Heine / Tania Kuteva: The Changing Languages of Europe, New York/Oxford: Oxford University Press 2006.
- Leo Hickey / Miranda Stewart (eds.): Politeness in Europe, Clevedon etc.: Multilingual Matters 2005.
- Samuel Huntington: The Clash of Civilizations and the Remaking of World Order, New York: Simon & Schuster 1996.
- Peter A. Kraus: Europäische Öffentlichkeit und Sprachpolitik: Integration durch Anerkennung, Frankfurt (Main)/New York: Campus.
- Ernst Lewy: Der Bau der europäischen Sprachen, Tübingen: Niemeyer 1964.
- Desmond Morris et al. (1979): Gestures: Their Origins and Distributions, New York: Stein & Day.
- Terri Morrison et al.: Kiss, Bow, or Shake Hands: How to Do Business in Sixty Countries, Holbrook: Adams Media 1994.
- Gyula Paczolay: European Proverbs in 55 Languages with Equivalents in Arabic, Persian, Sanskrit, Chinese and Japanese, Veszprém: Veszprém Press 1997.
- Baldur Panzer: "Gemeinsamkeiten und Unterschiede im Wortschatz europäischer Sprachen", in: Werner Besch et al. (eds.), Sprachgeschichte, vol. 2, p. 1123–1136, Frankfurt (Main): Lang 2000.
- Siegfried Piotrowski / Helmar Frank (eds.): Europas Sprachlosigkeit: Vom blinden Fleck der European Studies und seiner eurologischen Behebung, München: KoPäd 2002.
- Glanville Price: Encyclopedia of the Languages of Europe, Oxford: Blackwell 1998.
- Peter Rehder: 'Das Slovenische', in: Rehder, Peter (ed.), Einführung in die slavischen Sprachen, Darmstadt: Wissenschaftliche Buchgesellschaft 1998.
- Helmut Schmidt: Die Selbstbehauptung Europas: Perspektiven für das 21. Jahrhundert, Stuttgart/München: Deutsche Verlangs-Anstalt 2000.
- Miquel Siguan: Europe and the Languages, 2002, English internet version of the book L'Europa de les llengües, Barcelona: edicions 62.
- Bernd Spillner: Die perfekte Anrede: Schriftlich und mündlich, formell und informell, national und international, Landsberg (Lech): Moderne Industrie.
- M. Stephens: Linguistic Minorities in Western Europe, Llandysul 1976.
- Anna Trosborg: Interlanguage Pragmatics: Requests, Complaints and Apologies, Berlin/New York: Mouton de Gruyter 1995.
- Jan Wirrer (ed.): Minderheitensprachen in Europa, Wiesbaden: Westdeutscher Verlag 2000.
- Jan Wirrer: 'Staat—Nation—Sprache, eine Gleichung, die—fast—aufgeht: Minderheiten- und Regionalsprachen in Europa", in: Metzing, Dieter (ed.), Sprachen in Europa: Sprachpolitik, Sprachkontakt, Sprachkultur, Sprachentwicklung, Sprachtypologie, p. 21-52, Bielefeld: Aisthesis 2003.
