= Jean-Pol Martin =

German educational theorist

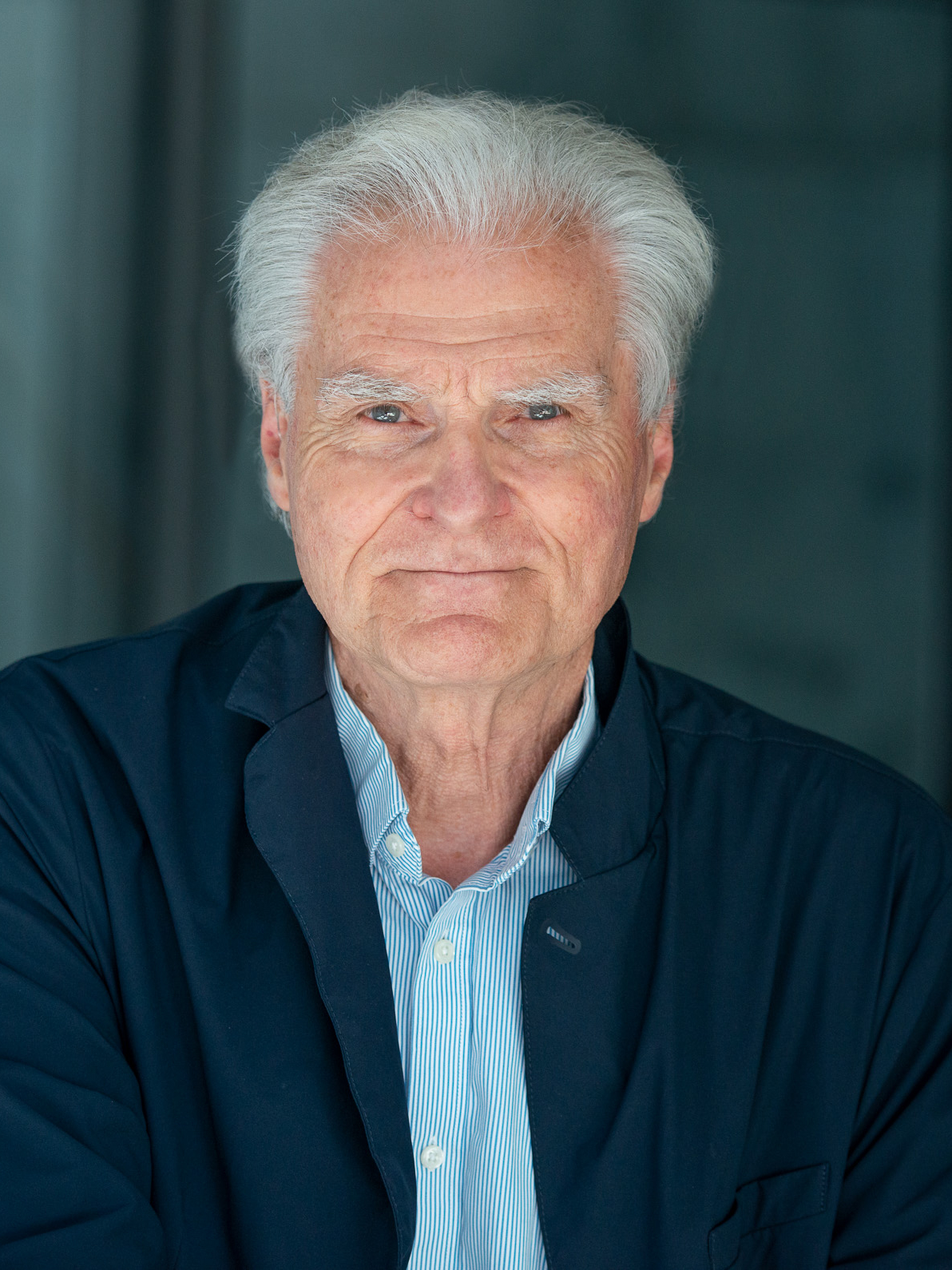
- Jean-Pol Martin in 2020
- Born: 1943 (age 82–83)
- Occupation: Professor
- Employer: Catholic University of Eichstätt-Ingolstadt (retired)
- Known for: Learning by teaching

Jean-Pol Martin (born 1943, Paris, France) studied teacher education for foreign language teachers in Germany, and developed a teaching method called learning by teaching. He spent most of his career at the Catholic University of Eichstätt-Ingolstadt and was a professor there until his retirement in 2008.

== Biography ==
Martin was born in 1943 in Paris and went to Germany in 1968. He studied German and French to become a teacher at a German grammar school, and also became an instructor in teacher education at the Catholic University of Eichstätt-Ingolstadt (Bavaria) in 1980.

He earned his undergraduate degree at Paris Nanterre University in 1969, then studied German and Romance languages at the University of Erlangen–Nuremberg from 1969 to 1975, then worked as a trainee teacher in French language from 1975 to 1977 at Albrecht Dürer Gymnasium in Nürnberg. He then taught French and German at the Gymnasium Höchstadt/Aisch from 1977 to 1980.

In 1980, he started working at the Catholic University of Eichstätt-Ingolstadt, training French teachers. Simultaneously he studied language acquisition and pedagogy at Justus Liebig University Giessen, and earned his Ph.D. there in 1985. His thesis on "Didactics of the French Language and Literature" was accepted in 1985. In 1994, after his Habilitation, he was appointed Privatdozent at Catholic University of Eichstätt and in 2000 he was appointed Professor.

== Work ==
Semantic field:Central to Martin’s entire theory, both for LdL and for the New Human Rights, are the following interacting concepts: thinking (information processing and conceptualization) – control – antinomies – dialectical thinking – exploratory behavior – cognitive map – flow effect – top-down/bottom-up – centripetal/centrifugal forces – neuronal behavior – linearity/nonlinearity – homeostasis – integration/differentiation – centralization/decentralization – self-referentiality – coherence.

=== Learning by teaching (LdL) ===
Martin established the learning by teaching method (German: Lernen durch Lehren) for students to learn by teaching their peers. The method became widely used in Germany in secondary education, and in the 1990s it was further formalized and began to be used in universities as well, and has spread to other disciplines and other countries worldwide.

By 2008, Martin had retired, and although he remained active, Joachim Grzega, Isabelle Schuhladen and Simon Wilhelm Kolbe took the lead in developing and promulgating LdL.

=== New human rights (NMR) ===
Since 2016, Martin has endeavoured to establish human rights without metaphysical reference and to orient them towards needs. The "New Human Rights" contain an anthropological, an ethical and a political part, based on the following needs: 1. thinking, 2. health, 3. security, 4. social inclusion, 5. self-fulfilment and participation, 6. meaning. In this way, greater operationalisability is achieved. An empirical basis is being developed by Nicole Kern, founder of the NMR agency. Furthermore, Martin is endeavouring to empirically test the effectiveness of NMR in the context of local politics. Finally, Simon Wilhelm Kolbe has founded a series "New Human Rights" in the Gabriele Schäfer Verlag, which already comprises several volumes.

=== Human–AI Symbiosis ===
Since 2023, Jean-Pol Martin has increasingly focused on the study of interactions between humans and artificial intelligence. He regards structured collaboration with AI systems such as ChatGPT as a new epistemological paradigm. Building on his theory of the “New Human Rights” (NMR), which emphasizes six universal basic needs such as thinking, participation, and meaning (see below), he has developed a model of co-evolutionary human–AI symbiosis. He understands this as a form of cooperation based on resonance, feedback, and structural compatibility, in which human goal-orientation and AI-supported systematization mutually reinforce each other.

== Books ==
- Martin, Jean-Pol (1985). Zum Aufbau didaktischer Teilkompetenzen beim Schüler : Fremdsprachenunterricht auf der lerntheoretischen Basis des Informationsverarbeitungsansatzes. Tübingen: Narr. ISBN 9783878084358. OCLC 46082031.
- Martin, Jean-Pol (1994). Vorschlag eines anthropologisch begründeten Curriculums für den Fremdsprachenunterricht. Tübingen: Narr. ISBN 9783823343738. OCLC 34693068.
- Haberzettl, Heinz; Hönle-Grosjean, Françoise; Martin, Jean-Pol; Rauch, Rainer (1982). A bientôt 1: Französisch fur Anfänger (in German). Ernst Klett. OCLC 35751985.
- Martin, Jean-Pol (2005). Lernen durch Lehren im schüleraktivierenden Französisch-Unterricht (in German). Universitätsbibliothek. OCLC 635212288.
- Martin, Jean-Pol (2005). Zum Aufbau von Basiswissen in der 11. Klasse neue Wege im Französisch-Unterricht (in German). Universitätsbibliothek. OCLC 635212367.
- Simon Kolbe, Jean-Pol Martin (Hrsg.): Praxishandbuch Lernen durch Lehren: Kompendium eines didaktischen Prinzips. Beltz-Juventa: Weinheim, 2024, ISBN 978-3-7799-7596-0
- Simon Kolbe, Jean-Pol Martin (Hrsg.): Lernen durch Lehren - Interdisziplinäre Perspektiven aus Forschung und Praxis. Beltz-Juventa: Weinheim, 2026, ISBN 978-3-7799-9277-6
