= Learning by teaching =

Method of teaching in which students teach the subject to each other

In the field of pedagogy, learning by teaching is a method of teaching in which students are made to learn material and prepare lessons to teach it to the other students. There is a strong emphasis on acquisition of life skills along with the subject matter.

== Background ==
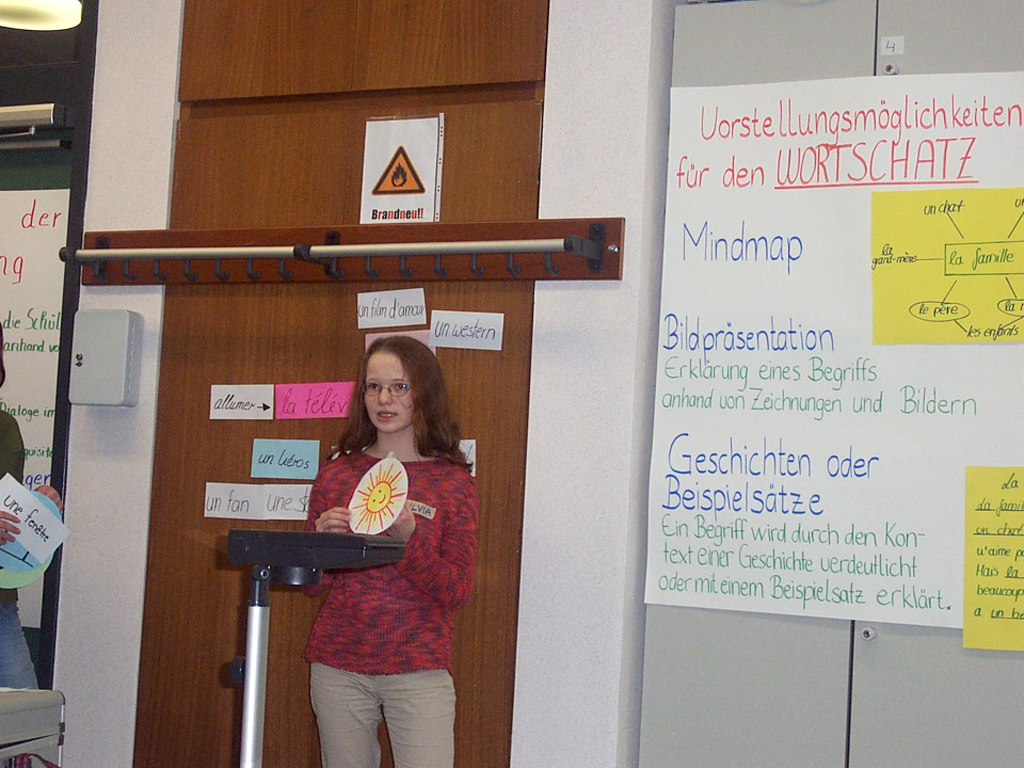
Student teaching vocabulary

The method of having students teach other students has been present since antiquity. Most often this was due to lack of resources. For example, the Monitorial System was an education method that became popular on a global scale during the early 19th century. It was developed in parallel by Scottish educationalist Andrew Bell working in Madras and English education innovator Joseph Lancaster working in London. Each attempted to educate masses of poor children with scant resources by having older children teach younger children what they had already learned.

Systematic research into intentionally improving education, by having students learn by teaching began in the middle of the 20th century.

In the early 1980s, Jean-Pol Martin systematically developed the concept of having students teach other in the context of learning French as a foreign language. He gave it a theoretical background in numerous publications, which was thus referred to in German as Lernen durch Lehren, shortened to LdL. The method was originally resisted, as the German educational system generally emphasized discipline and rote learning. However the method became widely used in Germany in secondary education, and in the 1990s it was further formalized and began to be used in universities as well. By 2008, Martin had retired and although he remained active, Joachim Grzega took the lead in developing and promulgating LdL.

== LdL method ==
Semantic field:Central to Martin’s entire theory, both for LdL and for the New Human Rights, are the following interacting concepts: thinking (information processing and conceptualization) – control – antinomies – dialectical thinking – exploratory behavior – cognitive map – flow effect – top-down/bottom-up – centripetal/centrifugal forces – neuronal behavior – linearity/nonlinearity – homeostasis – integration/differentiation – centralization/decentralization – self-referentiality – coherence.

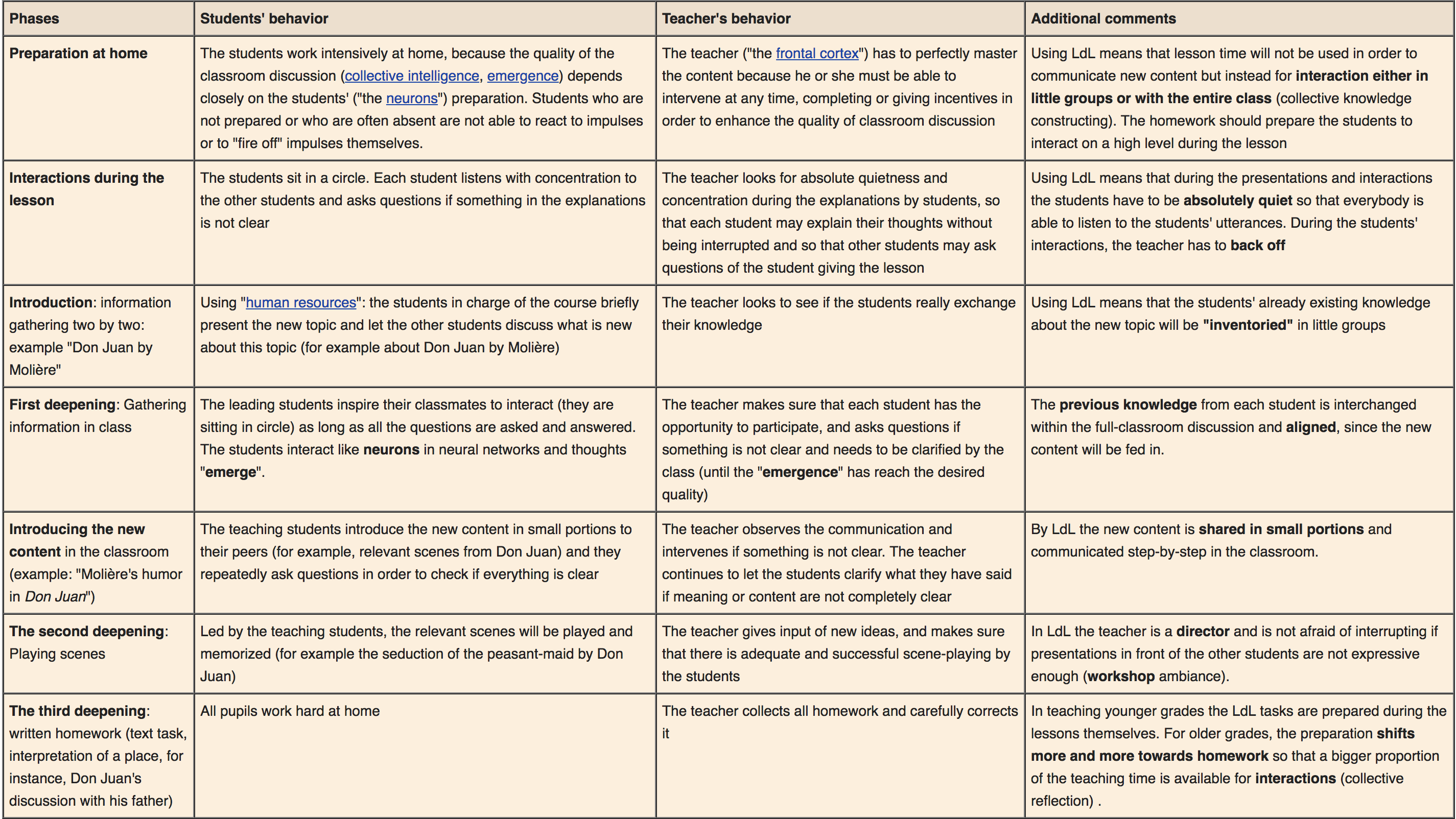
LdL, modeled on the structure of the brain by Martin

After preparation by the teacher, students become responsible for their own learning and teaching. The new material is divided into small units and student groups of not more than three people are formed.

Students are then encouraged to experiment to find ways to teach the material to the others. Along with ensuring that students learn the material, another goal of the method, is to teach students life skills like respect for other people, planning, problem solving, taking chances in public, and communication skills. The teacher remains actively involved, stepping in to further explain or provide support if the teaching-students falter or the learning-students do not seem to understand the material.

The method is distinct from tutoring in that LdL is done in class, supported by the teacher, and distinct from student teaching, which is a part of teacher education.

=== Plastic platypus learning ===
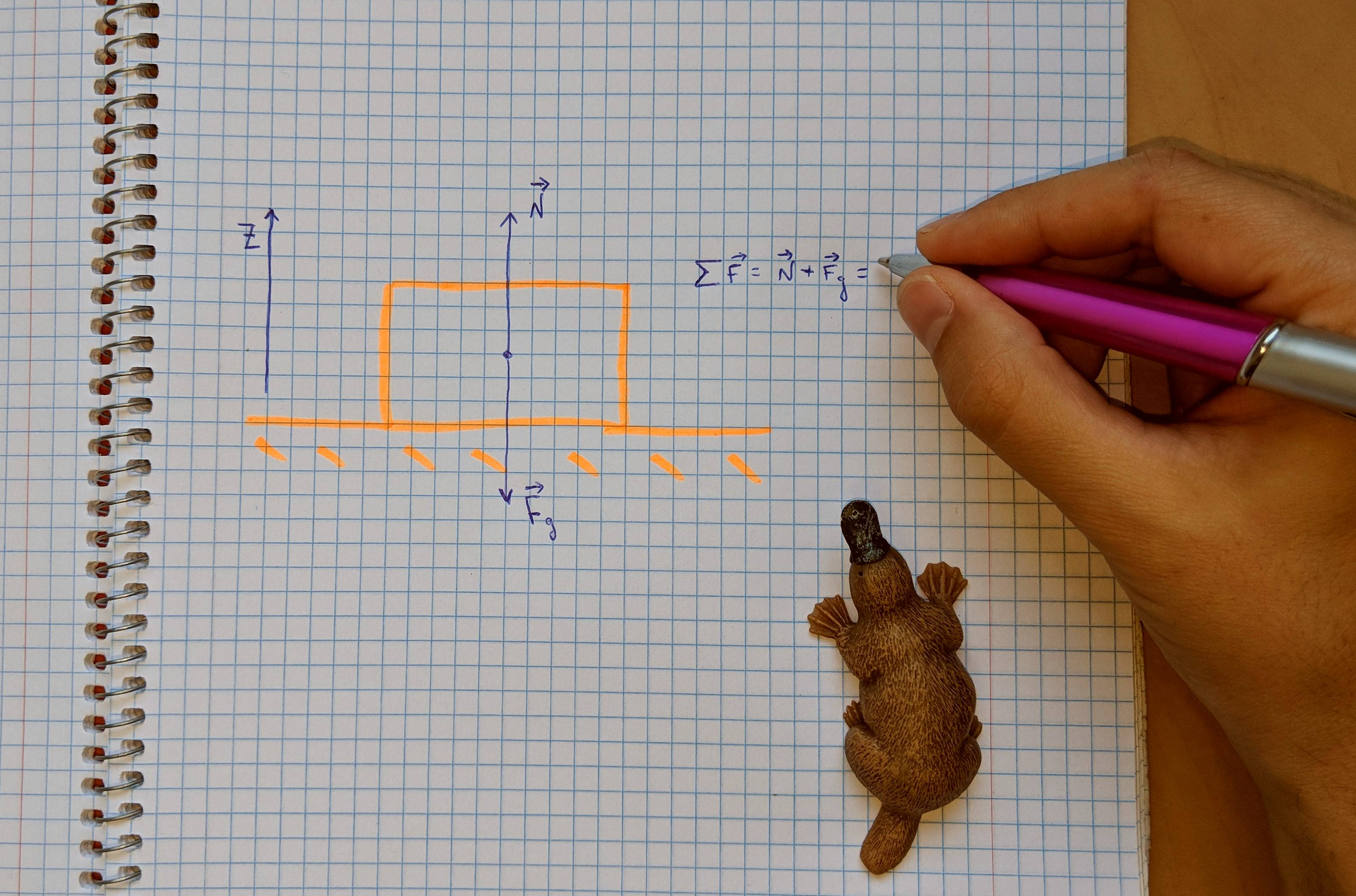
Plastic platypus learning in action

A related method is the plastic platypus learning or platypus learning technique. This technique is based on evidence that show that teaching an inanimate object improves understanding and knowledge retention of a subject. The advantage of this technique is that the learner does not need the presence of another person in order to teach the subject. The concept is similar to the software engineering technique of rubber duck debugging, in which a programmer can find bugs in their code without the help of others, simply by explaining what the code does, line by line, to an inanimate object such as a rubber duck.

Feynman technique flowchart

A similar process is the Feynman technique, named after physicist Richard Feynman, in which a person attempts to write an explanation of some information in a way that a child could understand, developing original analogies where necessary. When the writer reaches an area which they are unable to comfortably explain, they go back and re-read or research the topic until they are able to do so.

=== Flipped learning + teaching ===
Traditional instructor teaching style classes can be mixed with or transformed to flipped teaching. Before and after each (traditional/flipped) lecture, anonymized evaluation items on the Likert scale can be recorded from the students for continuous monitoring/dashboarding. In planned flipped teaching lessons, the teacher hands out lesson teaching material one week before the lesson is scheduled for the students to prepare talks. Small student groups work on the lecture chapters instead of homework, and then give the lecture in front of their peers. The professional lecturer then discusses, complements, and provides feedback at the end of the group talks. Here, the professional lecturer acts as a coach to help students with preparation and live performance.

=== Application of Learning by Teaching (LdL) to Human-Robot Interaction ===
The educational principle Lernen durch Lehren (LdL), or Learning by Teaching, has long been recognized for its ability to deepen the understanding of students through the act of teaching others. These same principles can be extended to human-robot interaction to enhance the learning process in artificial systems. In the context of human-robot interaction, the LdL approach provides a compelling model for designing robots that can learn, collaborate, and teach. One such relevant work done is developing a system where robots not only learn a skill from human experts but also teach that skill to novices. The robot begins as a learner, observing and practicing a task under expert supervision. Through the teaching process, the robot is required to explain, demonstrate, and evaluate the skill, much like students in the LdL method. By teaching a novice, the robot gains feedback about its own understanding. This mirrors the LdL model, where teaching strengthens the learner's grasp of the material. The robot’s ability to switch between the roles of student, collaborator, and teacher enhances its capability to adapt, refine its task model, and assess its knowledge through teaching interactions. This dynamic role adaptation provides greater flexibility and leads to better long-term knowledge retention, which is also a core advantage of the LdL approach in human education. Some of the benefits of applying LdL approach to human-robot interaction include:

- Enhanced Knowledge Evaluation: Teaching provides a new evaluation layer for the robot’s understanding. If the robot can teach effectively, it signifies a higher degree of task mastery, just as LdL assesses human understanding through peer teaching.
- Improved Human-Robot Collaboration: By integrating LdL principles, robots can enhance collaboration with humans. When a robot teaches or learns from a human, the shared knowledge model becomes more aligned, leading to more efficient teamwork.
- Promoting Lifelong Learning for Robots: Just as LdL fosters lifelong learning in humans by constantly engaging them in teaching roles, applying these principles to robots promotes continuous improvement in their learning models. The robot evolves not only by learning new skills but also by refining them through the act of teaching others.
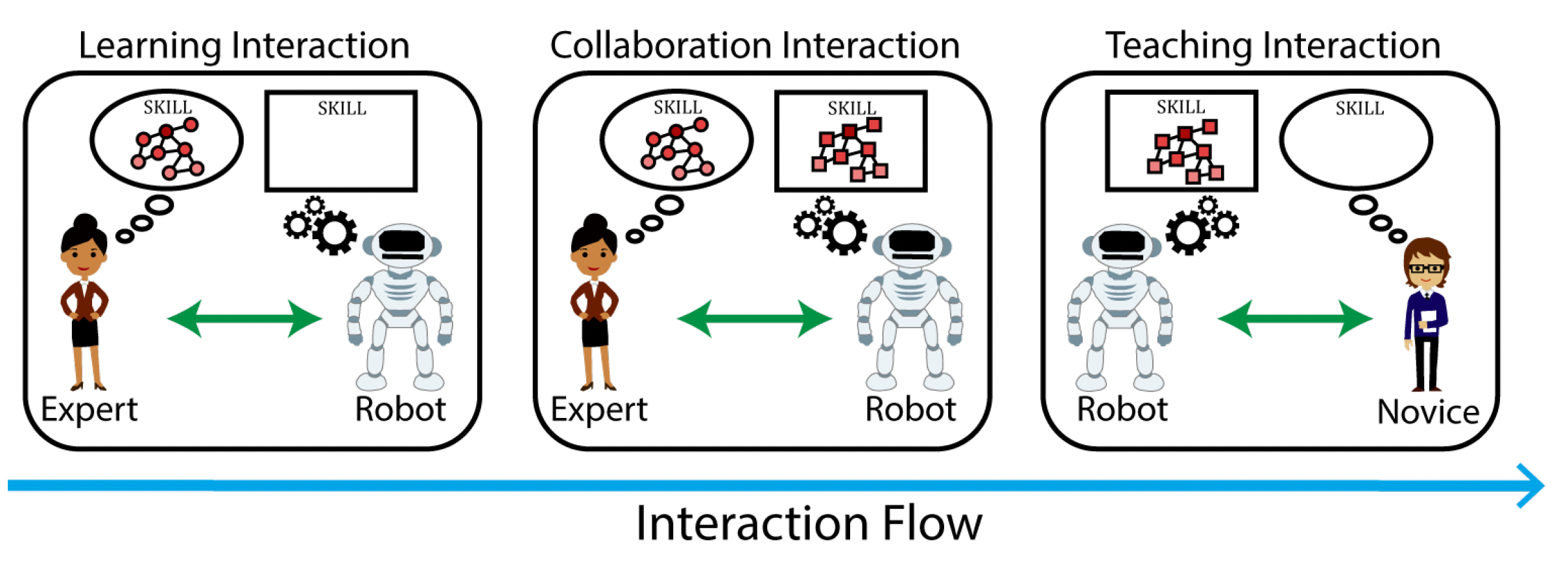
  Learning by Teaching(LdL) for Human-Robot Interaction

== See also ==
- Active learning – Educational technique
- Jigsaw (teaching technique)
- Learning theory (education) – Theory that describes how students receive, process, and retain knowledge during learning
- The Aha! effect – Suddenly understanding a problem or concept
- Think aloud protocol – Method to gather data in usability testing
- Peer mentoring
- Peer-led team learning
- Rubber duck debugging – A code debugging technique which involves explaining code to a rubber duck
