= Peer education =

Health information sharing

Peer education is an approach to health promotion, in which community members are supported to promote health-enhancing change among their peers. Peer education is the teaching or sharing of health information, values and behavior in educating others who may share similar social backgrounds or life experiences.

Rather than health professionals educating members of the public, the idea behind peer education is that ordinary lay people are in the best position to encourage healthy behaviour to each other.

== Areas of application ==
Peer education has become very popular in the broad field of HIV prevention. It is a mainstay of HIV prevention in many developing countries, among groups including young people, sex workers, people whom practice unprotected sex, or people who use intravenous drugs.

Peer education is also associated with efforts to prevent tobacco, alcohol and other drug use among young people. Peer educators can be effective role models for young adolescents by promoting healthy behavior, helping to create and reinforce social norms that support safer behaviors, and also serve as an accessible and approachable health education resource both inside and outside the classroom.

Peer education is useful in promoting healthy eating, food safety and physical activity amongst marginalized populations. Peer education is also favorably used in medical education.

Some public school districts have implemented peer-education programs. For example, New York City schools implemented a peer-led sex education program in 1974.

== The process ==
A peer education programme is usually initiated by health or community professionals, who recruit members of the target community to serve as peer educators. The recruited peer educators are trained in relevant health information and communication skills. Armed with these skills, the peer educators then engage their peers in conversations about the issue of concern, seeking to promote health-enhancing knowledge and skills. The intention is that familiar people, giving locally-relevant and meaningful suggestions, in appropriate local language and taking account of the local context, will be most likely to be able to promote health-enhancing behaviour change.

There is a great variety in the support provided to peer educators. Sometimes they are unpaid volunteers, sometimes they are given a small honorarium, sometimes they receive a reasonable salary. The peer educators may be supported by regular meetings and training, or expected to continue their work without formal supports.

== Theories ==
A variety of theories are offered regarding the question of how peer education is supposed to achieve positive results.

=== Kelly's popular opinion leader theory ===
The popular opinion leader theory suggests a parallel between peer education and the marketing of commercial products. Peer educators are seen as opinion leaders—respected and admired by other members of the community. These opinion leaders espouse a certain lifestyle (such as safer sex, or not smoking, etc.)—and their peers wish to emulate them.

=== Critical consciousness ===
Campbell argues that what peer education ought to do is to promote the kind of critical consciousness theorised by Paulo Freire. This means that peers use the peer education process to critically discuss their circumstances, especially the social factors impacting upon their health. Becoming critically aware of these forces is the first step to tackling them. So, for instance, if local norms regarding sexuality and gender put people's health at risk, this approach argues that peers should critically discuss those norms, so that they can then collectively seek to establish new more health-enhancing norms.

=== Social learning theory ===
Based on the work of Bandura and colleagues, social learning theory claims that modelling is an important component of the learning process. In the most basic sense, people observe behaviour taking place and then go on to adopt similar behaviour. Participants require the opportunity to practice modelled behavior and positive reinforcement if it is to be adopted successfully.

=== Differential association theory ===
Based on the work of Sutherland and Cressy, differential association theory has been applied to the study of crime. Rather than the result of biological or psychological disorders, crime is a learned behaviour. This learning happens in social situations by associating with those who can teach the necessary skills and techniques needed. Through this theory it can be understood that peers can be very influential for both positive and negative behaviours. Young people can learn both good and bad habits from each other. In differential association theory the mere association with others provides a learning opportunity. If social learning theory is essentially psychological, differential association theory is essentially sociological.

=== Role theory ===
Sarbin argues that peer educators will adapt to the role expectations of a tutor and behave appropriately. Furthermore, through adopting a role, individuals develop a deeper understanding and commitment to it. The potential is that Peer educators can develop a stronger commitment and a greater appreciation of the relevance of the health topic. Role theory is also based on the premise that communication can be blocked by differences in culture between the teacher and learner. Peer educators who have a similar set of experiences and culture are therefore likely to be more effective in promoting learning.

=== Communication of innovations theory ===
Developed by Rogers and Shoemaker, the communication of innovations theory explains how innovations come to be adopted by communities and what factors influence the rate of adoption. These factors include the characteristics of those who adopt the innovation, the nature of the social system, the characteristics of the innovation and the characteristics of change agents. Rogers and Shoemaker argue that all innovations follow a similar pattern of adoption, with one group of people—the innovators—taking it up immediately. Then there are early adopters, the early majority, the late majority and finally the laggards, including some who never adopt the innovation. In this theory key people influence the opinion leaders within a community. Change agents can be viewed as health professionals while opinion leaders correlate with peer educators. Rogers and Shoemaker argue that effective communication occurs when the source and receiver are homophilous, that is, are similar in certain attributes. These include beliefs, values, education and social status. This would suggest that peers communicate better than those who are unequal or different.

== Support ==
Peer educators are seen as credible sources of information. This has been shown to be particularly effective amongst the youth population. Peers and peer education are an important influence and approach in changing health behaviours.

One of the beliefs of peer education is that it is cost effective. Peer education has been identified as a more economical way to deliver health training.

A team of peer educators can extend health promotion outreach and be more accessible than paid health professionals. Peer educators help to bridge many of the gaps in service that occur through fear and suspicion of official health care providers, and to facilitate effective communication with community members and professional provider. Engaging youth peer educators helps professionals to extend their outreach of programs and services to ensure their efforts are impactful.

Peer education is empowering from both the standpoint of the peer educator and the individual receiving service. Peer education has been operative in encouraging knowledge, attitudes and intention to change behavior in AIDS prevention. Furthermore, nondirective peer support has been identified as the best way to motivate individuals in the preparation, action, or maintenance stages of readiness to change. Researchers have acknowledged that trained peer tutors were more effective than the untrained peers in influencing positive health outcomes. Peer education offers the educators the opportunity to benefit from taking on meaningful roles. Peer educators can act as enthusiastic advocates for the program and have a sense of purpose in their community outreach efforts.

Peer education is sustainable. This has been found to be an important issue for community-based health promotion interventions to make a difference over time. A grassroots initiative involving volunteers means that the health issue is reaching the target audience continuously with less of a threat of financial cutbacks impacting on their work. Research findings support the use of volunteer peer educators as a feasible and effective healthcare delivery strategy and as having promising indicators of sustainability over time. Sustainability through the engagement of peer educators can strengthen the social environment so that it is supportive of healthy behaviors.

== Debates ==
Despite its popularity, the evidence about peer education is mixed, and there is no consensus on whether it works or how it works. Researchers have questioned the validity of the assumption that peer education influences behavior.

One important line of inquiry suggests that peer education may work in some contexts but not in others. A study comparing peer education among sex workers in India and South Africa found that the more successful Indian group benefited from a supportive social and political context, and a more effective community development ethos, rather than the biomedical focus of the South African intervention.

A key issue concerns what a peer is and who defines this. In some instances age is a central factor but in other contexts, commonalities such as status may be more relevant. Caution has been noted regarding selection of peer educators. Some argue that there can be a stigma held against peer educators who have faced adversities in their own lives, particularly by mainstream health service organizations and professionals. Alternatively, peers educators would need to have high status within their social group to be effective. Researchers have argued that peer educators sometimes receive inadequate training, which limits their ability to educate their peers effectively and further state that peer selection and training is very important.

An important analysis on the development of many peer education projects is that it is led by adult constructions of adolescence and adolescent health behaviour. A central question should therefore be whose agenda is being served by using peer education projects which manipulate and exploit the social worlds of young people?

== See also ==
- Community health worker
- Health education
- Partners in Health
- Peer feedback
- Peer mentoring
- Peer support
- Peer tutor
- Peer-led team learning
- Peer-mediated instruction
