= Joachim Grzega =

German linguist

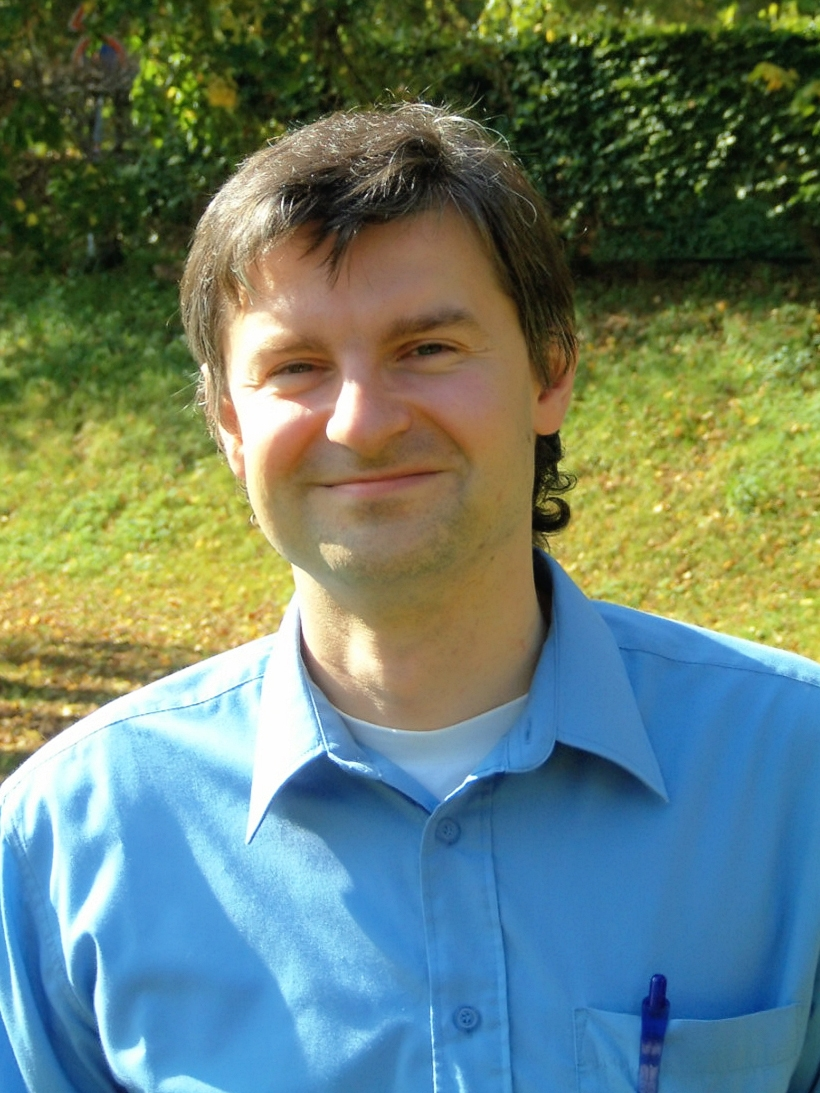
Joachim Grzega

Joachim Grzega (born 9 September 1971 in Treuchtlingen) is a German linguist. He studied English and French at the Catholic University of Eichstätt-Ingolstadt, University of Utah in Salt Lake City, Paris-Sorbonne University and the University of Graz. He has taught since 1998 at the Catholic University of Eichstätt-Ingolstadt. Grzega obtained his doctorate in 2000 in Romance, English and German linguistics. He obtained his habilitation (i.e. post-doctoral degree) in 2004. Professor Grzega has held interim or guest professorships in Münster, Bayreuth, Erfurt, Freiburg, and Budapest.

His focus is on onomasiology, eurolinguistics, intercultural communication, teaching of English as a lingua franca, language teaching in general and the role of language and communication in the transfer of knowledge. He also developed the Basic Global English (BGE) system for English teaching. With Onomasiology Online (Onon), he created one of the first peer-reviewed free access German linguistics journals. His second journal is specially dedicated to the relatively young branch of eurolinguistics: Journal for EuroLinguistiX (Jelix). He is also involved in the field of university-level language teaching, particularly in the development and dissemination of the Learning by teaching model founded in the 1980s by Jean-Pol Martin.

== Works ==
- (ed.) The Routledge Handbook of Eurolinguistics. London: Routledge 2025, ISBN 978-1-032-64765-4.
- Grzega, Joachim (2011). Hello World! Teacher Handbook Basic Global English. Books on Demand. ISBN 9783842379725.
- Grzega, Joachim (2011). Introduction to Linguistics from a Global Perspective: An Alternative Approach to Language and Languages. LINCOM Europa. ISBN 9783862880669.
- Grzega, Joachim (2001). Romania Gallica Cisalpina: Etymologisch-geolinguistische Studien zu den oberitalienisch-rätoromanischen Keltizismen. Walter de Gruyter. ISBN 9783110944402.
- Grzega, Joachim; Schoner, Marion (2008). "The didactic model LdL (Lernen durch Lehren) as a way of preparing students for communication in a knowledge society". Journal of Education for Teaching. 34 (3): 167. doi:10.1080/02607470802212157. S2CID 59268569.
- Grzega, Joachim (2002). "Some aspects of modern diachronic onomasiology". Linguistics. 40 (5). doi:10.1515/ling.2002.035.
- "Developing More than Just Linguistic Competence — The Model LdL for Teaching Foreign Languages" (PDF).
- Grzega, Joachim (2003). "On using (and misusing) prototypes for explanations of lexical changes". Word. 54 (3): 335–357. doi:10.1080/00437956.2003.11432537. S2CID 141822988.
- Grzega, Joachim (2005) The Role of English in Learning and Teaching European Intercomprehension Skills J. EurolinguistiX 1-18
