= Classwide Peer Tutoring =

Education practice

Classwide Peer Tutoring (CWPT) is a variation of peer-mediated instruction that has been used in elementary, middle school, and high school classrooms. In CWPT students form pairs and take turns in the roles of tutor and student. Students earn points for their teams by participating in the tutoring and the winning team is recognized. Researchers have investigated CWPT's effectiveness in several different academic areas.

== Description ==
Classwide Peer Tutoring (CWPT) is a form of peer-mediated instruction where the teacher creates pairs of students that alternately fill the roles of tutor and student. The tutor asks questions, records points, and provides feedback on whether the student's response matches the correct response designated by the teacher. The student responds orally and/or in writing to the questions and practices the correct answer three times when errors are made. The teacher supervises the tutoring and awards points for good tutoring. A classroom's student pairs are divided into two teams, and they earn points for their respective teams by answering questions correctly, correcting their incorrect answers, and tutoring appropriately. At the end of a week, the team that has earned the most points is recognized as the winning team. CWPT has been used to help students learn spelling, math facts, basic word reading, reading fluency, vocabulary, and facts related to an area of study. There appear to be more published studies of CWPT with positive outcomes in the area of spelling than in other areas. The CWPT technique has been used with several different age levels: pre-school, elementary, middle school, and high school. CWPT was initially developed and researched in the early 1980s at the Juniper Gardens Children's Project at the University of Kansas.

== Rationale ==
The developers of CWPT suggest that this technique provides students more opportunities to practice content or skills, encourages them to engage in active learning, and lets them receive immediate feedback. CWPT is also thought to provide students with practice using social skills.

== Evaluation of effectiveness ==
=== Research findings ===
CWPT has been effective for teaching spelling to both students in general education and students with attention deficit hyperactivity disorder (ADHD), mild intellectual disabilities, and learning disabilities. CWPT has helped improve the sight word retention and reading fluency of students with average school achievement, low school achievement, and learning disabilities. CWPT has also been shown to improve math fact fluency among students with and without disabilities, and it has increased the math achievement scores of middle school students with ADHD. There is also evidence that CWPT helps students of different ages learn facts, such as health and safety information, history material, and social studies concepts. CWPT has also been documented as having positive effects on the social skills and number of social interactions of students with mild disabilities and high functioning autism. There is also research demonstrating CWPT's effectiveness for teaching students of different ages and ability levels physical skills such as catching, striking a ball with a paddle, and cardio-pulmonary resuscitation skills.

=== Evaluation as an evidence-based practice ===
==== What Works Clearinghouse rating ====
The United States Department of Education's What Works Clearinghouse has evaluated CWPT for effectiveness in the areas of General Reading Achievement and English Language Learning (ELL). These evaluations resulted in a "potentially positive" effectiveness rating in the area of General Reading Achievement for elementary school students, and no rating for ELL due to the fact that no existing studies met What Works Clearinghouse criteria for evaluation. What Works Clearinghouse does not currently provide reports for CWPT's effectiveness in any other areas.

==== Promising Practices Network rating ====
Promising Practices Network considers CWPT a "Proven Program". The website states that CWPT meets full criteria for a "Proven Program" by having research outcomes that fall in the category of the website's target areas, having at least one outcome that is changed by at least 20% or .25 standard deviations, having at least one outcome with a statistically significant and meaningful effect size, having studies that use comparison groups, having studies with sample sizes of 30 or more, and by having research findings publicly available.

== Criticisms ==
A few studies have shown CWPT to have few advantages over more traditional methods of classroom instruction with middle or high school students, such as teacher-centered instruction or independent practice. Researchers have also found that while CWPT may increase the positive social interactions of students with ADHD during the tutoring, it does not necessarily affect their social behavior in other settings.
