= Keith James Topping =

British pedagogue

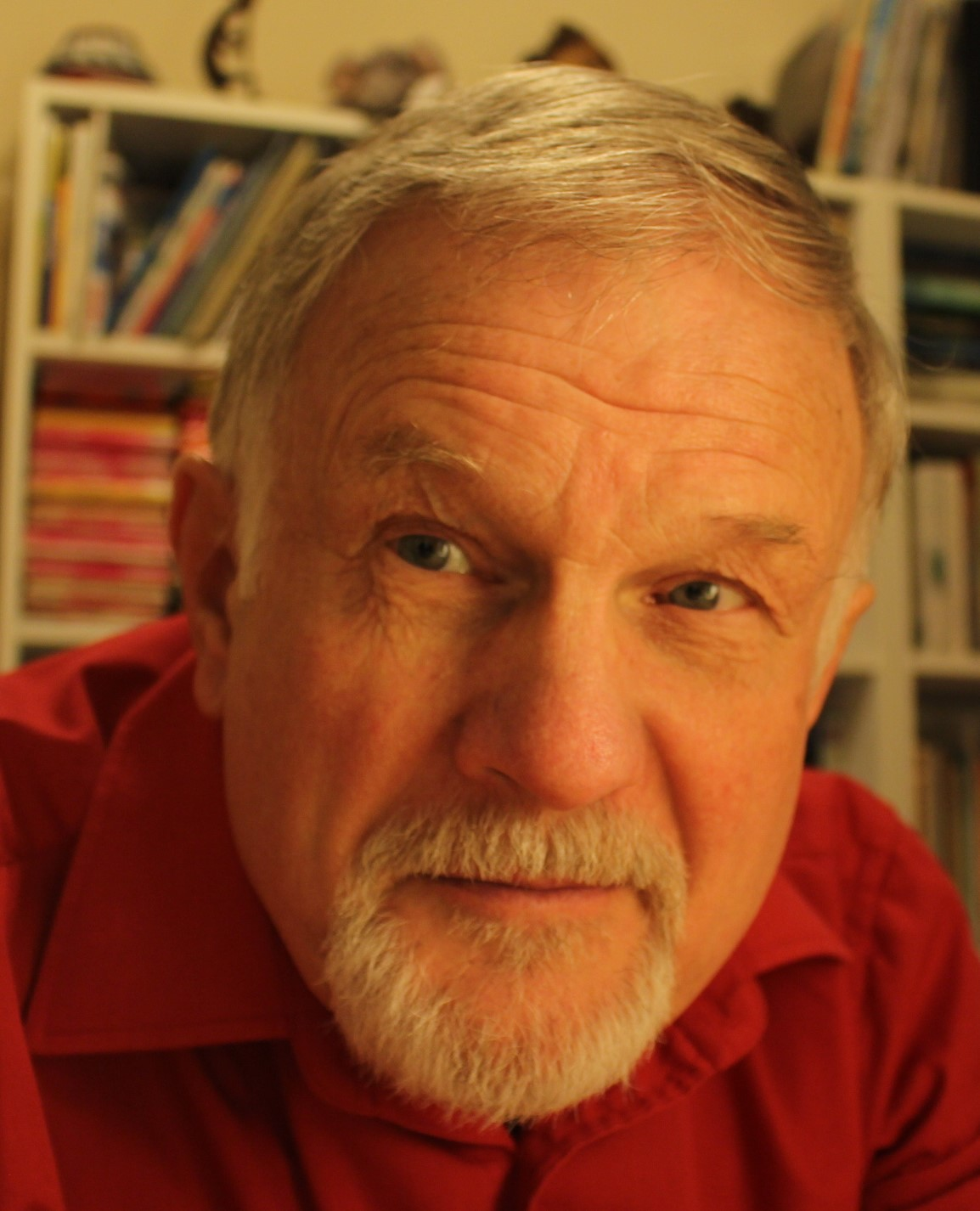
- Keith James Topping
- Born: 1 October 1947 (age 78); Stockport, Cheshire
- Occupations: Professor, researcher, author

Keith James Topping (born 1 October 1947) is a researcher in education. He designs intervention programs for teachers, parents and others to help children, then researches whether and how they work.

The public impact of his research work has been reported over the last 35 years in national, international newspapers and on radio, television as well as in news media online.

He is a professor of educational and social research at the University of Dundee, and an author of 26 books and over 400 academic peer reviewed journal papers, distance learning resources and other publications.

He is also a speaker and presenter (e.g. at the University of Exeter).

His main research interests are language and literacy, peer tutoring and other forms of peer learning, parents as educators, problematic behavior and social competence, computer assisted learning and assessment, and inclusion.

== Early life and background ==
He is married to Chen (b 1963). He has three children, all boys.

He went to the University of Sussex (social psychology BA), then to the University of Nottingham (child psychology MA), then to the University of Sheffield where he researched educational psychology (obtaining his PhD). He is a Fellow of the British Psychological Society.

== Work ==
He has a background in social work, teaching, and educational psychology. In 1992 he established an educational psychology training course at the University of Dundee, and later became a professor.

He developed a suite of literacy interventions: Paired Reading, Cued Spelling, and Paired Writing, which are disseminated by the English government as part of its evidence-based Wave 3 literacy intervention initiative.

He has worked as a member of the International Reading Association Task Force on the transfer into policy and practice of the Programme for International Student Assessment (PISA) and the Progress in International Reading Literacy Study (PIRLS).

A distance learning resource on tutoring created for UNESCO has been translated into Mandarin, Spanish and Catalan and distributed to Education Ministers in 190 countries, 5,000 copies by the University of Illinois to academic staff in 17 US universities, and 10,000 by Cabrini to voluntary organizations in the Chicago area.

A large scale (125 schools) randomised controlled trial has been undertaken, funded by ESRC in collaboration with Fife Council and the University of Durham.

He was cited as an "outstanding researcher" by President Bill Clinton during his time in office for his input to the "America Reads" initiative, which was later replicated under his supervision in Scotland.

In 2011 he was awarded the "Outstanding Contribution to Cooperative Learning Award" by the American Educational Research Association, for significant contributions to the theory and research underlying cooperative learning.

In 2020, he was reported to be the most cited educational researcher in Scotland, the eighth most cited educational researcher in the UK, and the 85th most cited educational researcher in the world.

== Bibliography ==
- Topping, K. J. (1983). Educational systems for disruptive adolescents. London: Croom Helm, New York: St Martin's Press. ISBN 0-312-23809-6 pbk.
- Topping, K. J. & Wolfendale, S. W. (Eds.) (1985). Parental involvement in children's reading. London: Croom Helm, New York: Nichols. ISBN 0-89397-230-4.
- Topping, K. J. (1986). Parents as educators: Training parents to teach their children. London: Croom Helm; Cambridge MA: Brookline Books. ISBN 0-914797-30-1 pbk.
- Topping, K. J. (1988). The peer tutoring handbook: Promoting co-operative learning. London: Croom Helm; Cambridge, MA: Brookline Books. ISBN 0-914797-43-3 pbk. (also in translation as: Insegnamento reciproco tra compagni (1997), Trento: Erickson. ISBN 88-7946-220-2).
- Paul, T., Topping, K. J., & Schnick, T. (1995). Fundamentals of reading renaissance. Madison WI: The Institute for Academic Excellence. No ISBN
- Topping, K. J. (1995). Paired reading, spelling & writing: The handbook for teachers and parents. London & New York: Cassell. ISBN 0-304-32942-8 pbk.
- Wolfendale, S. W. & Topping, K. J. (Eds.) (1996). Family involvement in literacy: Effective partnerships in education. London & New York: Cassell. ISBN 0-304-33423-5.
- Topping, K. J. (1996). Effective peer tutoring in further and higher education (SEDA Paper 95). Birmingham: Staff and Educational Development Association. ISBN 0-946815-29-1.
- Donaldson, A. J. M., Topping, K. J., Aitchison, R., Campbell, J., McKenzie, J. & Wallis, D. (1996). Promoting peer assisted learning among students in further and higher education (SEDA Paper 96). Birmingham: Staff and Educational Development Association. ISBN 0-946815-34-8.
- Topping, K. J. & Bamford, J. (1998). Parental involvement and peer tutoring in mathematics and science: Developing paired maths into paired science. London: Fulton; Bristol PA: Taylor & Francis. ISBN 1-85346-541-0.
- Topping, K. J. & Bamford, J. (1998). The paired maths handbook: Parental involvement and peer tutoring in mathematics. London: Fulton; Bristol PA: Taylor & Francis. ISBN 1-85346-497-X.
- Topping, K. J. (1998). The paired science handbook: Parental involvement and peer tutoring in science. London: Fulton; Bristol PA: Taylor & Francis. ISBN 1-85346-500-3.
- Topping, K. J. & Ehly, S. (Eds.) (1998). Peer-assisted learning. Mahwah NJ & London UK: Lawrence Erlbaum. ISBN 0-8058-2502-9 pbk.
- Topping, K. J. (2001). Peer assisted learning: A practical guide for teachers. Cambridge MA: Brookline Books. ISBN 1-57129-085-0 pbk.
- Topping, K. J. (2001). Thinking reading writing: A practical guide to paired learning with peers, parents & volunteers. New York & London: Continuum International. ISBN 0-8264-4945-X pbk.
- Topping, K. J., Pitkethly, V. & Bedon, N. (2001). Los adventures de Natividad y Toledo. (in translation in Spanish, German, Chinese and English). [Online] Available: http://www.dundee.ac.uk/esw/research/resources/natividadandtoledo [November 1].
- Topping, K. & Maloney, S. (Eds.) (2005). Inclusive Education. London & New York: RoutledegeFalmer. ISBN 0-415-33665-1 pbk.
- Zhou, Y., Topping, K. J., Todman, J., & Jindal-Snape, D. (2009). Cultural and educational adaptation of Chinese students in the UK. Saarbrücken, Germany: VDM Publishing. ISBN 978-3-639-16016-1
- Flynn, B., Hershfield, S., & Topping, K. J. (2010). Why psychologists need to base treatment recommendations on scientific evidence: Methodologies for intervening with disruptive adolescents. Lewiston, NY: Edwin Mellen Press. ISBN 0-7734-3775-4 pbk.
- Dekhinet, R., & Topping, K. J. (2010). TPALL: Technology for peer assisted language learning. Saarbrücken: Lambert Academic Publishing. ISBN 978-3-8383-4411-9.
- Boyle, C. & Topping, K. J. (Eds.) (2012). What works in inclusion? Maidenhead & New York: Open University Press. ISBN 0-33-524468-8 pbk.
- Topping, K., Duran, D., & Van Keer, H. (2016). Using peer tutoring to improve reading skills: A practical guide for teachers. London & New York: Routledge. ISBN 978-1-138-84329-5 (pbk). Also in Spanish and Dutch. Resources website: www.routledge.com/9781138843295.
- Topping, K., Buchs, C., Duran, D., & Van Keer, H. (2017). Effective peer learning: From principles to practical implementation. London & New York: Routledge. ISBN 978-1-138-90649-5 (pbk). Also in French, Spanish and Dutch.
- Duran, D., & Topping, K. J. (2017). Learning by teaching: Evidence-based strategies to enhance learning in the classroom. London & New York: Routledge. ISBN 978-1-138-12299-4 (pbk). Also in Spanish.
- Topping, K. J. (2018). Using peer assessment to inspire reflection and learning. Student assessment for educators series (Ed. J. H. MacMillan). New York & London: Routledge. ISBN 978-0-8153-6764-2
- Topping, K. J., Trickey, S., & Cleghorn, P. A teacher's guide to Philosophy for Children. New York and London: Routledge. ISBN 978-1-138-39326-4 (pbk).
