= Peer feedback =

Practice where feedback is given by one student to another student

Peer feedback is a practice where feedback is given by one student to another. Peer feedback provides students opportunities to learn from each other. After students finish a writing assignment but before the assignment is handed in to the instructor for a grade, the students have to work together to check each other's work and give comments to the peer partner. Comments from peers are called as peer feedback. Peer feedback can be in the form of corrections, opinions, suggestions, or ideas to each other. Ideally, peer feedback is a two-way process in which one cooperates with the other.

== Definition ==
Peer feedback involves providing opportunities for students to talk and listen, write, read meaningfully, and reflect on the content, ideas, issues, and concerns of an academic subject. Peer feedback can be defined as "a communication process through which learners enter into dialogues related to performance and standards." Peers should look for missing details, ask questions about parts that are confusing, and praise what they enjoyed. Peer feedback may be referred to by many terms such as peer evaluation, peer critiquing, peer editing, or peer response. Some researchers consider peer feedback as an effective technique for the development of the students' writing whilst others promote its use in oral presentation activities. Others prefer instructor feedback to peer feedback. As a collaborative process of providing feedback and constructive criticism of each other's work, peer feedback has long been regarded as a valuable tool to improve writing skills.

== Benefits ==
According to Atay and Kurt, there are positive effects to peer feedback in a classroom setting. First, it provides diversity with teaching compared with the traditional way of giving teacher feedback. In peer feedback sessions, students do not just listen to teacher instructions, but work with their peers and tend to get more practice. Students' anxiety may become lower which can increase learning motivation.

Second, sharing opinions with peers is helpful in building and increasing one's confidence. Clearly expressing what one is trying to say requires confidence and sufficient knowledge; people need to self dress what to say with their own knowledge or experiences. Thus, giving useful feedback definitely strengthens one's confidence. Moreover, peer feedback helps student to take more responsibilities in learning process. Besides doing assignments, students have to read others' work carefully as well so that one is not only responsible for his/her own work but also the others'.

When peer feedback is established it allows students to interact with their peers and creates high social skills while learning material more effectively. Interaction with other students allows students to have better social approaches when interacting. Learning by peer feedback gives students more of an opportunity to work as a unit instead of individuals working alone. Working in groups gives students more useful life skill that well help prepare them for the future. Peer feedback gives more control to the student, the student can decide if they want to use the criticism their peers are giving them or not. When given options more students are more likely to give and absorb more feedback. Peer feedback has confirmed an increase in affect; students that have increasing responsibilities have more drive towards their work and a spike in confidence. Furthermore, Kristanto (2018) found that peer feedback is an essential element of peer assessment. In peer assessment, feedback from peers can provide suggestions or correction for students' future works as companion of the received grade.

In addition, peer feedback reduces writing anxiety, especially in ESL students, and in effect improves the quality of their writing. Student’s awareness of their mistakes through their friend's opinions and the collaboration reduces anxiety. Peer feedback enlightens student's awareness of the similar difficulties and weaknesses in writing their peers encounter and eventually motivates and builds their self-confidence, reducing writing anxiety. Peer feedback effectively compliments teacher feedback for quality writing According to Jahin (2012) ESL students enjoy "social, cognitive, affective, and methodological benefits". Peer feedback thereby offers students a sense of audience, which increases their motivation and confidence in writing. The multiple reviews through peer feedback improve the quality of the ESL student’s writing. Hussein and Al Ashri (2013) explained that peer feedback can skill students into excellent writers as student’s apprehension to write the first time, eventually melts away.

Also, peer review is helpful because it develops students and makes them read and comment on each other to improve the process of writing with their peers. They can all feel the joy of sharing their comments and their writing within the group. Therefore, students become more confidence about their writing. However, Urzua reminds us of how crucial is the question of training learners to cope with the task of evaluating their peers. Students may not be able to ask constructive questions for redrafting.

According to Benjamin Keating, peer feedback can actually recreate the unfair effects it aims to mitigate, not only between teachers and students, but also among students, especially in terms of gender (Spear;Stygall), race (Fox;Villanueva), linguistic differences (Allaei and Connor;Silva and Matsuda), and ideological differences (Horner;Myers;Trimbur).

== Need for additional training ==
However, it is noted in several studies the difficulty in having students self-assess. One of the greatest difficulties is the accuracy of scores. Orsmond, Merry, and Reiling (1997) found that students often misjudged their assessments. Using a science class assessment project, they compared students' self-assessment scores with those of the teacher. They found that there was an overall disagreement between the markings of 86%, with 56% of students over-marking and 30% under-marking. They also noted a general trend of poor students tending to over-mark their work while the good students tended to under-mark their work.

Sadler (1989) counteracts these difficulties by emphasizing the need for teacher to pass the responsibility of assessment to the student through a process of students becoming a trainee in assessment. The teacher's role is to guide the student in critical evaluation of their learning. Providing guided but direct and authentic evaluative experience for students enables them to develop their evaluative knowledge, thereby bringing them within the guild of people who are able to determine quality using multiple criteria. It also enables transfer of some of the responsibility for making decisions from teacher to learner.

A study by McDonald and Boud (2003) investigated whether introducing self-assessment training would affect student learning, specifically on how they perform on external measures of achievement. Teachers were trained in self-assessment practices and then they introduced the practices to their students. In the end, both the student and the teachers responded well to the self-assessment practices. On average, students who were trained in self-assessment strategies outperformed their peers in all curriculum are assessments. The students also reported that the practices were not only helpful on the external assessments, but that they also impacted their perceptions of their classroom learning.

This was reaffirmed by Orsmond, Merry, and Reiling (2000) who implemented a method of student self and peer assessment involving student constructed marking criteria with a poster presentation in a biology class. In an evaluative questionnaire at the end of the project, 84% of students stated the exercise (self-assessment reflective practices) had been beneficial, made them think more and become more critical. Some 68% of the students felt they had learned more and had gained confidence.

According to Muamaroh Muamaroh, and Ulya Septiana Pratiwi, Based on the questionnaires, the students did not satisfy if their peer gave feedback for their essay. They believed that their peers were not doing best in giving feedback. They also perceived that feedback was given by their peers was a bit unclear explanation and sometimes it made the students felt doubt whether their work was really incorrect or not.

"I am not satisfied if my work is corrected by a friend, because I feel that the feedback given is not optimal and they are not doing at their best." (SF8)

"In my opinion, the drawback of peer feedback is that the feedback given by friends is sometimes unclear and a little confusing, so I do not understand what the feedback is." (SF9)

"When I get feedback from friends, sometimes, I doubt with their feedback whether it is correct or not, and it makes me not believe in it." (SF13)

== Impact of cultural differences ==
Based on Allaei and Connor's finding (1990), students' view of peer feedback can be very different due to cultural differences, so the effectiveness of using peer feedback will not be the same in different situations. For example, Chinese students learning English are more likely to welcome peer feedback than people from western countries because Chinese culture encourages working together and maintaining harmony in a group. In contrast, the Western culture encourages individual study. Therefore, it is assumed that peer feedback may be more useful in Chinese learning environment than in Western countries.

== Facilitating peer review in a classroom setting ==
Several studies have been conducted to assess how peer reviewing works in the classroom setting, many of which also make suggestions for how teachers can facilitate effective peer review sessions.

Wigglesworth and Storch discuss the significance of peer reviews to gain constructive engagement with writing by considering which aspects of peer review help people understand their writing better and which ones don’t. They found that discussing writing with others enables students to reflect on and consider how to improve their writing in that collaborative feedback gives the author ideas on what they do well and what they need to work on. Nevertheless, they acknowledge that collaborative writing and feedback can be negative, given issues such as students not giving equal amounts of effort when reading and having differences in writing styles, both of which can decrease the effectiveness of collaboration. In order to address these challenges, the authors suggest that teachers establish clear guidelines, promote open communication, and create a safe work atmosphere as a means of reducing conflicts and making sure that working together and giving feedback is helpful for everyone.

In "Peer review from the student's perspective: Invaluable or invalid?" Charlotte Brammer states that teachers should discourage students from viewing peer review as a correction mechanism to recognizing its value as a collaborative engagement. The study found that students who received extensive instruction and preparation in conducting peer reviews displayed a higher level of appreciation for the process. However, the findings also highlight concerns regarding unhelpful feedback and the reliability of peers' reviewing abilities, suggesting that teachers assist students in preparing for peer review and dedicating class time to facilitate it effectively, including having an understanding of the writer's audience, promoting meaningful group interaction, and encouraging thoughtful responses and revisions within the feedback. Establishing a sense of shared community among students is crucial for creating trust and confidence in their peers' ability to provide accurate and valuable revisions, as well as avoiding unhelpful feedback.

Kara Poe Alexander discusses the process of presenting and revising student work through peer review and notes that teachers play a pivotal role in guiding students through it effectively. Alexander argues that example projects, assessment criteria sheets, and of expectations are essential and that holding multiple sessions of peer review with teacher involvement is helpful in providing comprehensive feedback. She states that feedback sheet guides help keep readers focused during a review and give them a reference to look at when deciding what type of feedback to give. She also notes that taking in different types of feedback can give the writer an idea of how others see their work, and that it is useful for writers to engage readers with questions and readers to look at writing as if they are the intended audience for it. Both written and verbal feedback contribute to valuable insights for revision. In a six-week-long study of international students, Bee Chamcharatsri explored the benefits and limitations of peer review and sought to determine if verbal and written feedback was more beneficial. The results indicated that the preferred peer review method was verbal communication as participants reported that verbal communication was easier to convey their thoughts and concerns than using written feedback.

Wendy Bishop's article "Revising the technical writing class: Peer Critiques, self-evaluation, and portfolio grading" explores other methods to enhance writing education. Bishop states that integrating peer critiques, self-evaluation, and portfolio grading can promote collaboration, critical thinking, and student growth by showcasing progress and achievements, and that peer critiques encourage active feedback exchange, thus improving self-reflection. Bishop emphasizes how these approaches develop a deeper understanding of writing, boosting the confidence and proficiency of student writers.

According to Brieger, Katharine & Bromley, Pam. Studie aims to better understand how L2 writers conduct peer feedback activities, by looking at the types and traits of the feedback and how they influence revisions made in subsequent drafts using a web-based peer review system. A new methodology for studying web-based peer review comments is introduced. The results suggest that a specific type of feedback, alteration, and specific type of feedback, recurring, are important predictors for revision. Research on second language writing has found that when commenting on each other’s work, L2 students often focus on local issues, such as spelling, vocabulary and grammar, and much less on global issues, such as style, and content (Biber, Nekrasova, & Horn, 2011; Ferris, 2004, Leki, 1991).

== See also ==
- Peer education
- Peer-led team learning
- Peer-mediated instruction
- Peer mentoring
- Peer tutor
