= Peer-mediated instruction =

Education practice

Peer-mediated instruction (PMI) is an approach in special education where peers of the target students are trained to provide necessary tutoring in educational, behavioral, and/or social concerns.(Chan et al., 2009). In PMI, peers may mediate by modeling appropriate behavior themselves, using prompting procedures to elicit appropriate behavior from the target students, and reinforcing appropriate behavior when it occurs. The peer tutors are chosen from the target students' classrooms, trained to mediate and closely observed during mediation.

Among the advantages noted to the technique, it takes advantage of the positive potential of peer pressure and may integrate target students more fully in their peer group. Conversely, it is time-consuming to implement and presents challenges in making sure that the peers follow proper techniques. However, studies have suggested it may be an effective technique for a wide range of students, including those with autism spectrum disorders.

== Procedure ==
A student or students will be chosen from the target student's classroom to serve as a peer tutor. Teachers reviewed the top candidates, and selected the tutors based on social skills, language skills, school attendance and classroom behavior.

The student or students chosen as peers must be properly coached before the peer relationship begins, both to understand the importance of the intervention and the methods which should be used. Instructors may model behaviors to the peer tutors and may roleplay with the peer tutors, allowing the peer tutors to experience both parts in the PMI relationship. Once the PMI relationship begins, the teacher provides ongoing feedback, watching the peer at all times while the intervention is being used. (Chan et al., 2009).

Research has been done with many different types of learners, including students with learning disabilities, behavior disorders and attention deficit hyperactivity disorder, which show that PMI may be effective for a wide range of students (Fuchs & Fuchs, 2005; Flood, Wilder, Flood & Masuda, 2002). In 2009, Research in Autism Spectrum Disorders published a paper by Chan et al. that concluded that PMI is a potentially effective intervention approach for students with Autism disorders.

== See also ==
- Classwide Peer Tutoring
- Peer education
- Peer feedback
- Peer-led team learning
- Peer mentoring
- Peer tutor
- Peer support
