= Peer learning =

Educational practice of interaction among students

One of the most visible approaches to peer learning comes out of cognitive psychology, and is applied within a "mainstream" educational framework: "Peer learning is an educational practice in which students interact with other students to attain educational goals." Other authors including David Boud describe peer learning as a way of moving beyond independent to interdependent or mutual learning among peers. In this context, it can be compared to the practices that go by the name cooperative learning. However, other contemporary views on peer learning relax the constraints, and position "peer-to-peer learning" as a mode of "learning for everyone, by everyone, about almost anything." Whether it takes place in a formal or informal learning context, in small groups or online, peer learning manifests aspects of self-organization that are mostly absent from pedagogical models of teaching and learning.

== Connections with other learning theories ==
=== Constructivism ===
In his 1916 book, Democracy and Education, John Dewey wrote, "Education is not an affair of 'telling' and being told, but an active and constructive process." In a later essay, entitled "Experience and Education", Dewey went into greater detail about the science of child development and developed the basic Constructivist theory that knowledge is created through experience, rather than passed down from teacher to student through rote memorization. Soviet psychologist Lev Vygotsky, who developed the concept of the Zone of Proximal Development, was another proponent of constructivist learning: his book, Thought and Language, provides evidence that students learn better through collaborative, meaningful problem-solving activities than through solo exercises.

The three distinguishing features of constructivist theory are claims that:

- Learning occurs within a context that is itself part of what is learned
- Knowing and doing cannot be separated
- Learning is a process that is extended over time

These are clearly meaningful propositions in a social context with sustained relationships, where people work on projects or tasks that are collaborative or otherwise shared.

Educational Psychology Professor Alison King explains in "Promoting Thinking Through Peer Learning" that peer learning exercises as simple as having students explain concepts to one another are proof of social constructivism theory at work; the act of teaching another individual demands that students "clarify, elaborate on, and otherwise reconceptualize material." Joss Winn, Senior Lecturer in Educational Research at University of Lincoln, proposes that schools radically redefine the teacher-student relationship to fit this constructivist theory of knowledge in his December 2011 paper, "Student as Producer". Carl Rogers' "Personal Thoughts on Learning" focus on the individual's experience of effective learning, and eventually conclude that nearly the entire traditional educational structure is at odds with this experience. Self-discovered learning in a group that designates a facilitator is the "new approach" Rogers recommends for education.

In general, peer learning may adapt constructivist or discovery learning methods for the peer-to-peer context: however, peer learning typically manifests constructivist ideas in a more informal way, when learning and collaboration are simply applied to solve some real shared problem.

=== Critical pedagogy ===
Paulo Freire in Pedagogy of the Oppressed advocated a more equitable relationship between teachers and students, one in which information is questioned and situated in political context, and all participants in the classroom work together to create knowledge. Paulo Blikstein, Assistant Professor of Education at Stanford University wrote in Travels in Troy with Freire: Technology as an Agent of Emancipation that through exploratory building activities, "Not only did students become more autonomous and responsible, they learned to teach one another."

=== Connectivism ===
Yochai Benkler explains how the now-ubiquitous computer helps us produce and process knowledge together with others in his book, The Wealth of Networks. George Siemens argues in Connectivism: A Learning Theory for the Digital Age, that technology has changed the way we learn, explaining how it tends to complicate or expose the limitations of the learning theories of the past. In practice, the ideas of connectivism developed in and alongside the then-new social formation, "massive open online courses" or MOOCs.

Connectivism proposes that the knowledge we can access by virtue of our connections with others is just as valuable as the information carried inside our minds. The learning process, therefore, is not entirely under an individual's control—learning can happen outside ourselves, as if we are a member of a large organization where many people are continuously updating a shared database.

Rita Kop and Adrian Hill, in their critique of connectivism, state that:

it does not seem that connectivism's contributions to the new paradigm warrant it being treated as a separate learning theory in and of its own right. Connectivism, however, continues to play an important role in the development and emergence of new pedagogies, where control is shifting from the tutor to an increasingly more autonomous learner.

== Connections with other practices ==
=== Peer Learning in Global health ===
In global health, peer learning has emerged as a significant approach for spreading evidence-based practices at scale. Research from The Geneva Learning Foundation has demonstrated that structured peer learning networks can achieve higher efficacy scores (3.2 out of 4) compared to traditional cascade training (1.4) or expert coaching (2.2) when measured across variables including scalability, information fidelity, and cost effectiveness. For example, in Côte d'Ivoire, a peer learning initiative reached health workers across 85% of the country's districts within two weeks, leading to locally led innovations in community engagement. The approach has shown particular promise in complex health interventions where traditional randomized controlled trials may be impractical, with one study showing peer learning participants were seven times more likely to successfully implement COVID-19 recovery plans compared to a control group.

== Perspectives of other modern theorists ==
In a joint paper, Roy Williams, Regina Karousou, and Jenny Mackness argue that educational institutions should consider "emergent learning," in which learning arises from a self-organized group interaction, as a valuable component of education in the Digital Age. Web 2.0 puts distributed individuals into a group setting where emergent learning can occur. However, deciding how to manage emergence is important; "fail-safe" management drives activity towards pre-determined outcomes, while "safe/fail experiments" steer away from negative outcomes while leaving space open for mistakes and innovation. Williams et al. also distinguish between the term "environment" as controlled, and "ecology" as free/open.

Cathy Davidson and David Theo Goldberg write in The Future of Learning Institutions in a Digital Age about the potential of "participatory learning," and a new paradigm of education that is focused on mediated interactions between peers. They argue that if institutions of higher learning could begin to value this type of learning, instead of simply trying to implement "Instructional Technology" in classrooms, they could transform old models of university education. Davidson and Goldberg introduce "Ten Principles for the Future of Learning," which include self-learning, horizontal structures, and open source education. Peter Sloterdijk's recent book "You Must Change Your Life" proposes similar ideas in the context of a "General Disciplinics" that would "counteract the atrophy of the educational system" by focusing on forms of learning that takes place through direct participation in the disciplines. (p. 156)

Yochai Benkler and Helen Nissenbaum discuss implications for the realm of moral philosophy in their 2006 essay, "Commons-Based Peer Production and Virtue". They argue that the "socio-technical systems" of today's Internet make it easier for people to role-model and adopt positive, virtuous behaviors on a large scale.

Joseph Corneli and Charles Jeffrey Danoff proposed the label "paragogy" to describe a collection of "best practices of effective peer learning". They published a short book along with several papers in which they discuss five "paragogical principles" that form the core of their proposed learning theory. These were generated by rethinking Malcolm Knowles principles of andragogy for a learning context that is co-created by the learners.

== Experiments ==
The learning theories and approaches described above are currently being tested in peer-learning communities around the world, often adapting educational technology to support informal learning, though results in formal learning contexts exist too. For example, Eric Mazur and colleagues report on "Ten years of experience and results" with a teaching technique they call "Peer Instruction":

Peer Instruction engages students during class through activities that require each student to apply the core concepts being presented, and then to explain those concepts to their fellow students.

This approach made early use of a variant of the technique that is now known as the "flipped classroom":

To free up class time for ConcepTests, and to prepare students better to apply the material during class, students are required to complete the reading on the topics to be covered before class.

Peer 2 Peer University, or P2PU, which was founded in 2009 by Philipp Schmidt and others, is an example from the informal learning side. Speaking about the beginnings of P2PU, Schmidt echoes Siemens' connectivism ideas and explains that, "The expertise is in the group. That's the message, that everyone can bring something to the conversation." In numerous public talks, Schmidt argues that current educational models are "broken" (particularly on the basis of the high cost of university-level training). He suggests that social assessment mechanisms similar to those applied in open-source software development can be applied to education. In practice, this approach uses peer-based assessment including recommendations and badges to provide an alternative form of accreditation.

Jeff Young's article in the Chronicle of Higher Education, "When Professors Print Their Own Diplomas", sparked a conversation about the necessity of formal degrees in an age when class lectures can be uploaded for free. The MIT Open Teaching initiative, for example, has since 2001 put all of its course materials online. But David A. Wiley, then Psychology Professor at Utah State, went further, signing certificates for whoever takes his class. A similar practice has become even more visible in learning projects like Udacity, Coursera, and EdX. Although these projects attempt to "scale education" by distributing learning materials produced by experts (not classic examples of peer learning), they do frequently feature peer-to-peer discussions in forums or offline.

== Applications in development ==
In the forward to a book on the Power of peer learning by Jean-H. Guilmette, Maureen O'Neil, then president of Canada's International Development Research Centre, states that

Our experience has proven that [peer learning] is an efficient way to transmit knowledge across a wide range of groups or regions. Peer learning, based on jointly generated evidence, is also an effective means to build capacity and foster scientific excellence. The body of knowledge it generates is a powerful tool for the development of evidence-based policy.

Guilmette suggests that peer learning is useful in the development context because

It is my view that managing networks, especially those that are made up of sovereign nations, is fundamentally different from managing companies, organizations, or ministries that fall under a single authority. In essence, the dominant management approach for companies and institutions rests on cybernetics, with the view of keeping communications and accountability simple and clear. Managing methods that are successful in such a context [are] counterproductive when managing networks.

Guilmette cites Anne K. Bernard, who in a report based on extensive interviews, concludes:

Effective networks act not simply on the basis of optimizing within constraints by attempting to force-fit predicted, linear and regulated programmes of work onto dynamic policy and client communities. Rather, they hone capacities and create mechanisms for the regular feedback and reflected analyses which are needed to deal with the ambiguity of these environments, and to adapt interactively with them.

== Criticism ==
Scardamalia and Bereiter explain in "Computer Support for Knowledge-Building Communities" that computers in the classroom have the opportunity to restructure the learning environment, but too often they are simply used to provide a digital version of a normal lesson or exam. They propose that classrooms be exchanged for "knowledge-building communities" where students can use computers to connect to and create knowledge in the outside world. However, as illustrated in citations above, this way of thinking about learning is often at odds with traditional educational praxis.

In "The Role of the Learning Platform in Student-Centered E-Learning", Kurliha, Miettinen, Nokelainen, and Tirri found a "difference in learning outcomes based on the tools used." However, the variables at work are not well understood, and are the subject of ongoing research. Within a formal education setting, a 1994 study found that students were more responsive to feedback from a teacher than they were to peer feedback. However, another later study showed that training in assessment techniques had a positive impact on individual student performance.

A classic study on motivation in peer tutoring showed that "reward is no motivator." Although other more recent work has shown that non-monetary rewards or acknowledgement can make a difference in performance (for certain populations of peer producers), the exact motivations for going out of the way to teach or tutor someone else are not clearly understood. As mentioned above, learning is often just part of solving a problem, so "peer learning" and "peer teaching" would tend to happen informally when people solve problems in groups.

== In practice ==
=== Research ===
Research on peer learning may involve participant observation, and may itself be peer produced. Some of this research falls under the broader umbrella of Scholarship of Teaching and Learning. Computer-supported collaborative learning is one obvious context in which to study peer learning, since in such settings "learning is observably and accountably embedded in collaborative activity." Research has shown that peer collaboration in nursing simulations not only fosters a deeper understanding of clinical concepts but also improves students' ability to navigate complex decision-making scenarios, aligning with the principles of constructivist learning where knowledge is co-created through experiential peer interactions. However, peer learning can play a role in settings where traditional conceptions of both "teaching" and "learning" do not apply, for instance, in academic peer review, in organizational learning, in development work, and in public health programmes. Research in these areas may fall within the area of organization science, science, technology and society (STS) or other fields.

== See also ==
- Action learning
- Andragogy
- Autodidactism
- Cooperative learning
- Learning by teaching
- Networked learning
- Peer assessment
- Peer mentoring
- Peer production
- Peer support
- Reciprocal teaching
- Supplemental Instruction
