= Peer mentoring =

Form of mentorship based on experience

Peer mentoring is a form of mentorship that usually takes place between a person who has lived through a specific experience (peer mentor) and a person who is new to that experience (the peer mentee). An example would be an experienced student being a peer mentor to a new student, the peer mentee, in a particular subject, or in a new school. Peer mentors are also used for health and lifestyle changes. For example, clients, or patients, with support from peers, may have one-on-one sessions that meet regularly to help them recover or rehabilitate. Peer mentoring provides individuals who have had a specific life experience the chance to learn from those who have recovered, or rehabilitated, following such an experience. Peer mentors provide education, recreation and support opportunities to individuals. The peer mentor may challenge the mentee with new ideas, and encourage the mentee to move beyond the things that are most comfortable. Most peer mentors are picked for their sensibility, confidence, social skills and reliability.

Critics of peer mentoring insist that little is known of the nature of peer mentoring relationships and that there are few consistent studies indicating the outcomes of peer mentoring beyond good feelings among peers and the development of friendships. Peer mentoring led by senior students may discourage diversity and prevent Critical analysis of the higher education system.

== Program design characteristics ==
The frequency with which peer mentors and mentees meet varies according to the particular mentoring program. Some pairs may make contact once a month, while others may meet 3-4 times per month or more. It is usually advised that mentors and mentees meet more often in the beginning of the relationship in order to establish a good foundation. Mentors and mentees may maintain contact through email, telephone or in-person meetings. Peer mentoring organizations may also set up social events for those participating in the program. These events provide good opportunities for increased social interaction between mentors and mentees.

The compatibility of mentor and mentee is a factor that should be taken into consideration when choosing pairs. Mentors and mentees may benefit from having similar backgrounds, interests and life experiences. Age, gender, ethnicity, language preferences, and education may be taken into consideration when pairing mentors with mentees.

The quality of the peer mentoring relationship is important for mentees to experience positive results. A mentor relationship is more successful when the mentor cares for the whole person and not just the academic or career side of a person. Successful mentors tend to be available, knowledgeable, educated in diversity issues, empathic, personable, encouraging, supportive, and passionate. Although this is not an exhaustive list of qualities, they have been shown to be important for successful mentoring relationships. It is important to keep qualities like this in mind when recruiting and training mentors.

The objectives of a peer mentoring program should be well-defined and measurable. The effectiveness of the program should be monitored to ensure that the objectives are being met. One way to monitor the effectiveness of a program is to administer evaluations to the mentors and mentees.

== In education ==
Peer mentoring in education was promoted during the 1960s by educator and theorist Paulo Freire:

"The fundamental task of the mentor is a liberatory task. It is not to encourage the mentor's goals and aspirations and dreams to be reproduced in the mentees, the students, but to give rise to the possibility that the students become the owners of their own history. This is how I understand the need that teachers have to transcend their merely instructive task and to assume the ethical posture of a mentor who truly believes in the total autonomy, freedom, and development of those he or she mentors."

Peer mentors appear mainly in secondary schools where students moving up from primary schools may need assistance in settling into the new schedule and lifestyle of secondary school life. However peer mentoring can occur at the grade school level, the undergraduate level, and the graduate school level. The goals of the program may vary according to the level, the educational institution or the discipline.

Peer mentors in secondary schools aid in the transition of younger students from primary school to secondary school. They may assist mentees with their school work and study skills, peer pressure (such as pressure to use drugs or have sex), issues with attendance and behavior, and typical family problems. Youth mentors are persons for children or adolescents to spend time with, often to compensate for absent family members or an inadequate home environment. Mentoring programs for youth can be especially useful for students who lack social support, and who therefore may be susceptible to delinquency.

Peer mentors for undergraduates may assist newly admitted students with time management, study skills, organizational skills, curriculum planning, administrative issues, test preparation, term paper preparation, goal setting, and grade monitoring. Additionally, such mentors may provide other forms of social support for the student, such as friendship, networking, and aiding the student's adjustment to college life.

A peer mentor at the graduate school level may assist new students in selecting an advisor, negotiating the advisor/advisee relationship, preparation for major examinations, publishing articles, searching for jobs, and adjusting to the rigors of graduate school life.

=== In higher education ===
Peer mentoring in higher education has enjoyed a good name and is seen favorably by both educational administrators and students. During the last decade, peer mentoring has expanded and is found in most colleges and universities, frequently as a means to outreach, retain, and recruit minority students. Peer mentoring is used extensively in higher education for several reasons:

- Benefits attributed to classical mentoring (when an older adult mentors a younger person) can translate to peer mentoring relationships, mainly when the peer mentor and the mentee have similar backgrounds. Some colleges and university campuses have encouraged peer mentorship programs to aid retention of under-represented populations, such as women in economics.
- The lack of role models or volunteers forces administrators and student leaders to use students as peer mentors of other students—usually first year students, ethnic minorities, and women—in order to guide, support, and instruct junior students;
- Because peer mentoring programs require a low budget for administration and/or development, they become a cheap alternative to support students perceived as likely to fail.

There have been numerous examples in various universities. Some examples are as follows:

==== Peer Assisted Study Session at Monash University ====
Peer Assisted Study Sessions (PASS) is a peer-led structured academic mentoring program designed to provide academic assistance for new students in their transition from college to university studies and also for students struggling in certain units at Monash University. The school of medicine at Monash utilizes peer mentoring as part of its curricula and it is delivered by accomplished senior year medical students to junior medical students on a weekly basis after rigorous selection and training. Friendly peer leaders are empowered with guided support to impart their knowledge and experience, and motivate mentees to do better with coursework.

==== The Coca-Cola Valued Youth Program ====
One established cross-age mentoring program is the Coca-Cola Valued Youth Program (VYP), which originated in San Antonio, Texas through the Intercultural Development Research Association (IDRA). In an effort to decrease truancy, the need for disciplinary actions and drop-out rates of students, this program paired up "at-risk" middle school students to tutor "at-risk" elementary school students, both primarily of Hispanic origin with limited English proficiency. In this case, the tutors who participated were not only rewarded by getting paid and receiving course credit, but also by receiving recognition for their service and by improving their own academic and tutoring skills through special tutoring classes. These VYP program benefits, in turn, resulted in a positive impact on school success and lowered the dropout rates of these tutors.

==== The University of Massachusetts Peer Mentor Program ====
The Peer Mentor program at UMass Amherst offers undergraduate students the chance to be live-in, part-time staff members for freshman residents within residential life. This is a paid position. The Peer Mentor's "job" is to assist freshman students with their transition from high school to college. UMass Peer Mentors offers academic support within the first year and are responsible for connecting the residents to campus resources throughout the academic year. Peer mentors follow a curriculum that includes but are not limited to: assisting in New Student Orientation (NSO), academic mentoring (which includes references to tutoring centers, deans, and undergraduate advising), connecting faculty with the students, and hosting various academic success workshops.

==== California State University, Northridge EOP Mentoring program ====
The EOP program has a subset of programs that assist student success with the aid of peer mentors. The program started in the late 1960s with it goal to further higher education and students success for underrepresented students. It was student lead to provide equity for minority students. This population included ethnic minorities, women, and later branched off to better serve students with disabilities and foster youth. The history at California state University, Northridge established EOP programs at all 23 CSU campuses. The main goal of peer mentors at EOP is to help students connect and be made aware of campus resources, staff, university etiquette, and serve as a supportive role model to foster motivation and transition from Community College or Highschool into a four year Institution. EOP's subset of programs includes Transitional Programs that utilize peer mentors in the classroom with supervision of faculty. Peer mentors often share their experiences and build rapport with incoming students to encourage students to seek help by example.

=== Advantages in education ===
Peer mentoring may help new students adapt to a new academic environment faster. The relationship between the mentor and mentee gives the mentee a sense of being connected to the larger community where they may otherwise feel lost. Mentors are chosen because they are academically successful and because they possess good communication, social and leadership skills. As a consequence, mentors serve as positive role models for the students, guiding them towards academic and social success. Mentors provide support, advice, encouragement, and even friendship to students. Peer mentoring may improve student retention rates.

Mentors also stand to benefit from the mentor/mentee relationship. Mentors develop friendships through their participation in mentoring programs and usually derive satisfaction from helping a younger student, and possibly shaping his or her life in a positive way. Mentors may also be paid, and they may receive other benefits such as prioritized registration, course credit, and references.

In higher education tutorial settings, the benefits of peer mentoring programs also extend to class tutors. Using grounded theory techniques, Outhred and Chester found that five themes underlie their experiences: role exploration, sharing responsibility, regulation of the peer-tutored groups, harnessing the peer tutors' role, and community.

=== Criticisms ===
Peer mentoring programs usually target ethnic minorities, people with disabilities and women. This approach tends to be conceived out of the "deficiency model" where multi-ethnic students, women and students with disabilities are perceived as being in need of help and unlikely to succeed unless senior students or successful adults help them. One of the main criticisms of peer mentoring is the lack of research to show how peer mentoring relationships work, how they develop, and what their outcomes are. Also, the nature of being either a mentor or mentee and at the same time a peer can make the relationship a dual one where other identities also converge. Some peer mentoring programs promote assimilation among ethnic minority students because of the use of student role models who are perceived as successful in social and educational environments characterized by majority students. These role models then become the people that peer mentees strive to imitate or emulate. A more subtle criticism of peer mentoring refers to their lack of supervision and structure: most peer mentoring programs led by undergraduate students rarely have direct supervision of full-time university staff.

Given the fact that students are led by other students who serve as peer mentors, critics say that university staff may free themselves from their responsibility to listen and help first year students classified as peer mentees, the group with the largest attrition rate in higher education. Without extensive training and supervision, senior students who serve as mentors may offer unreliable guidance to peer mentees. There is little research on what happens within peer mentoring relationships. Maryann Jacobi, in an extensive meta-analysis of mentoring research, concludes by asking, "Does mentoring help students succeed in college? If so, how? Both theoretical and empirical answers to these questions are lacking." Stephanie Budge states:

"The concept of mentoring has become increasingly popular over the past few decades. Mentoring has been advertised as necessary in order for students and employees to flourish in their environment. However, the lack of research concerning peer mentoring programs in particular is surprising. While there is an abundance of articles on the topic of mentoring in the educational setting, authors must be held to more stringent research standards and more definitional consistency. In addition to higher quality research, the fundamental flaws within peer mentoring programs need to be corrected before these programs can reach their full potential on college campuses."

Peer mentoring in higher education usually focuses on social, academic, and cultural skills that can help students graduate from colleges and universities, and how the educational system works (e.g. how to apply for financial aid, how to register for classes, how to write papers, how to choose a major, etc.). The knowledge students receive usually comes from senior students who serve as peer mentors.

Although peer mentoring programs are appealing to most people and seem easy to implement and develop, there is little research to suggest that peer mentoring gives the same results as classical mentoring.

=== Versus classical mentoring ===
Morton-Cooper and Palmer distinguish between classical mentoring (also known as primary mentoring) and contract or facilitated mentoring. Classical mentoring is characterized as an informal, often spontaneous enabling relationship between an older mentor and a younger mentee, based on a shared wish to work together, usually for a long period, without financial compensation for the mentor.

Peer mentoring differs from classical mentoring in two aspects. First, in peer mentoring mentors and mentees are close in age, experience, educational level, and they may also overlap in their personal identities, which are usually the criteria for matching, but this may leave junior students vulnerable to peer pressure and unsupervised rivalry. Second, peer mentoring programs are semi-structured planned programs with specific guidelines and frequently with a set number of meetings and activities within a predetermined amount of time. Students who enroll in peer mentoring programs tend to be matched mostly according to major course of study, gender, language of preference, and ethnic background, and those students who share the largest number of similarities tend to become peers in the peer mentoring relationship. Little research is available to know what happens between peer mentors and peer mentees who have different characteristics.

=== Cross-age ===
The Handbook of Youth Mentoring provides the following definition of cross-age peer mentoring:

"Peer mentoring involves an interpersonal relationship between two youths of different ages that reflects a greater degree of hierarchical power imbalance than is typical of a friendship and in which the goal is for the older youth to promote one or more aspects of the younger youth's development. Peer mentoring refers to a sustained (long-term), usually formalized (i.e. program-based), developmental relationship. The relationship is "developmental" in that the older peer's goal is to help guide the younger mentee's development in domains such as interpersonal skills, self-esteem and conventional connectedness and attitudes (e.g. future motivation, hopefulness)."

Cross-age mentoring can be distinguished from peer mentoring by the fact that the mentor is in a higher grade level and/or is older than the mentee. Whereas in peer mentoring students of the same age are paired together based on varying levels of achievement. Karcher (2007) also notes:

"Cross-age peer mentoring programs utilize structure, meet for more than ten meetings, do not focus primarily on deficit or problem reduction, and require an age span of at least two years."

==== Advantages of Cross Age Mentoring ====
In general, cross-age mentoring programs can involve a tutoring or teaching component, personal mentorship and guidance, or both, and they incorporate many of the advantages of other forms of peer mentorship. Because student mentors are closer in age, knowledge, authority and cognitive development than adult mentors, mentees often feel freer to express ideas, ask questions, and take risks. These similarities also make it easier for mentors to understand personal and academic problems that the mentee may be experiencing, and present solutions in a more understandable and relevant way. Furthermore, unlike same-age peer mentoring, cross-age programs can prevent feelings of inferiority on the part of the mentee when they are mentored or tutored by a student of the same age or status. Thus, mentors who are slightly older than their mentees can take advantage of the higher status provided by their age difference while enjoying increased compatibility with their students. The specific benefits of cross-age mentoring/tutoring are numerous, and are briefly described here in three main categories: increased academic achievement, improved interpersonal skills, and personal development.

Cross-age mentorship, and tutoring programs in particular, support the academic achievement and learning process of both the mentor and the mentee. Mentees benefit from increased personalized attention in a one-on-one setting and can work at their own pace. Sessions are customized for the mentee's individual questions, needs, and learning styles, and mentees gain a greater mastery of the material and concepts, while developing creativity and critical thinking skills. The mentor may also gain a deeper understanding of the material or subject that they are teaching, as this relationship often encourages a deeper dedication to their own studies so that they may more effectively communicate what they've learned. The mentor gains a deeper sense of responsibility, dedication, and pride in being able to help a peer, while both students take pride in mutual accomplishments and successes. Ultimately, cross-age mentorship programs may increase retention and graduation rates, especially among minority students.

In addition to improved learning and transmission of information, the mentorship process allows both students to develop more effective interpersonal communication skills. Mentees learn how to effectively form and pose questions, seek advice, and practice active listening and concentration. Similarly, the mentors gain valuable practice in effective teaching strategies. This format fosters increased self-esteem, empathy and patience in both participants, potentially creating new friendships and breaking down social barriers for students struggling to adjust to a new academic setting. Often the mentor will serve as an important role-model, and can model academic skills and work habits as well as personal values (e.g. dedication to service, empathy, and internal motivation). This relationship can be pivotal for the success of new or underserved students in academia by providing an opportunity for peers to discuss academic issues, career choices, research ideas, and personal matters.

=== Peer tutoring ===
A peer tutor is anyone who is of a similar status as the person being tutored. In an undergraduate institution this would usually be other undergraduates, as distinct from the graduate students who may be teaching the writing classes; in a K-12 school this is usually a student from the same grade or higher.

Stated by Goodlad and Sinclair, "Peer tutoring is the system of instruction in which learners help each other and learn by teaching. Tutoring schemes have been used in a variety of context, with students teaching students, students teaching school pupils, non-professional adults teaching adults and children, and pupils teaching pupils."

Keith James Topping's work on peer tutoring identified a typology of peer tutoring that includes ten dimensions: 1) curriculum content, 2) constant constellation, 3) year of study, 4) ability, 5) role continuity, 6)place, 7)time, 8) tutee characteristics, 9) tutor characteristics and 10)objectives.

There are many benefits for both the peer tutor and tutee in this relationship; one aspect of this is that the tutor can establish a rapport with the tutee in a way that a teacher cannot. Tutors themselves benefit from working with students. The skills a tutor develops can be applied to other aspects in life including graduate school or a future job. The main skill being that ability to work with people. Peer tutors often succeed better in their respective courses due to the opportunity to help others. They are allowed to spend lots of time working through adversity which ultimately benefits them in the classroom. In the course of tutoring, there could be more benefits than challenges for the tutors themselves. Careers are often influenced from a person's experience in peer tutoring. Peer tutoring help people develop the skill to be a leader. These skills can serve an important role for success in one's career.

Because the peer tutor is seen by the tutee as being more at their own level, advice given by the tutor may be accepted more readily than advice from a teacher. Another key reason for this is that a peer tutor does not give any grade on the paper, whereas a teacher serving in a tutor role may still be perceived as someone who grades papers. Students in peer tutoring programs benefit from creating better attitudes and self concept regardless of academic performance.

Peer tutors skills are based on creating a healthy environment for the tutee. They often give positive feedback, keep the person being tutored on task, give praise, and give reassurance. The tutor also tends to switch up teaching strategies.

In higher education tutorial settings, the benefits of peer tutoring programs also extend to class tutors.

==== Monitoring and evaluation ====
Cross-age mentoring programs require careful consideration of the goals, objectives and the available human, physical and financial resources in order to ultimately assess the progress made by the participants and the overall usefulness of the program. Frequent assessment is important as it gives valuable insight into how well the cross-age mentoring curriculum is organized and implemented, and provides positive reinforcement for both the mentor and mentee. Mentors should be pre-screened according to their academic proficiency and attitudes to ensure that they will be able to meet the needs of a mentee. Moreover, mentors will also benefit from ongoing training, supervision and psychological support by teachers, administrators, parents and other members of the community.

== In the workplace ==
Peer mentoring can offer employees a valuable source of support and information in the workplace. Peer mentoring offers a low cost way to train new employees or to upgrade the skills of less experienced workers. Mentees may feel more comfortable learning from a peer than in a hierarchical setting. Mentors as well as mentees may also benefit from the bonds they form with colleagues. In 1978 Edgar Schein described multiple roles for successful mentors in the work setting. New employees who are paired with a mentor are twice as likely to remain in their job than those who do not receive mentorship.

== In health care ==
Peer mentoring has been shown to increase resistance to stress-related anxiety and depression in patients, or clients, affected by chronic illness or mental health issues. Mental health peer mentors and peer support groups help clients change their lifestyle and adhere to a more productive healthy lifestyle by adjusting habits and helping them realize helpful ways of coping and taking on personal responsibility. Peer mentors can also help patients prepare for medical and surgical procedures and adhere to treatment regimes. Peer mentoring has been implemented in programs to support survivors of traumatic brain injury, cancer patients, dialysis patients, diabetics persons with spinal cord injuries, and to reduce HIV transmission and increase adherence to treatment in HIV-positive IV drug users. Peer mentoring is also used in training health care workers.

== Other applications ==
Peer mentoring has also been used to; assist foster youth in receiving resources EOP CSUN, prevent gang violence in schoolchildren and teens, to support young people who have been sexually exploited, to improve the quality of child care among economically disadvantaged first-time mothers, and to improve performance in military recruits.

== See also ==
- Peer feedback
- Peer education
- Peer tutor
- Peer-mediated instruction
- Peer learning
- Peer support
- Mentorship
- Youth mentoring
