= Strictly standardized mean difference =

Statistical measure of effect size

In statistics, the strictly standardized mean difference (SSMD) is a measure of effect size. It is the mean divided by the standard deviation of a difference between two random values each from one of two groups. It was initially proposed for quality control and hit selection in high-throughput screening (HTS) and has become a statistical parameter measuring effect sizes for the comparison of any two groups with random values.

== Background ==
In high-throughput screening (HTS), quality control (QC) is critical. An important QC characteristic in a HTS assay is how much the positive controls, test compounds, and negative controls differ from one another. This QC characteristic can be evaluated using the comparison of two well types in HTS assays. Signal-to-noise ratio (S/N), signal-to-background ratio (S/B), and the Z-factor have been adopted to evaluate the quality of HTS assays through the comparison of two investigated types of wells. However, the S/B does not take into account any information on variability; and the S/N can capture the variability only in one group and hence cannot assess the quality of assay when the two groups have different variabilities. Zhang JH et al. proposed the Z-factor. The advantage of the Z-factor over the S/N and S/B is that it takes into account the variabilities in both compared groups. As a result, the Z-factor has been broadly used as a QC metric in HTS assays. The absolute sign in the Z-factor makes it inconvenient to derive its statistical inference mathematically.

To derive a better interpretable parameter for measuring the differentiation between two groups, Zhang XHD proposed SSMD to evaluate the differentiation between a positive control and a negative control in HTS assays. SSMD has a probabilistic basis due to its strong link with d^{+}-probability (i.e., the probability that the difference between two groups is positive). To some extent, the d^{+}-probability is equivalent to the well-established probabilistic index P(X > Y) which has been studied and applied in many areas. Supported on its probabilistic basis, SSMD has been used for both quality control and hit selection in high-throughput screening.

== Concept ==
=== Statistical parameter ===
As a statistical parameter, SSMD (denoted as $\beta$) is defined as the ratio of mean to standard deviation of the difference of two random values respectively from two groups. Assume that one group with random values has mean $\mu_1$ and variance $\sigma_1^2$ and another group has mean $\mu_2$ and variance $\sigma_2^2$. The covariance between the two groups is $\sigma_{12}.$ Then, the SSMD for the comparison of these two groups is defined as

$$\beta =  \frac{\mu_1 - \mu_2}{\sqrt{\sigma_1^2 + \sigma_2^2 - 2\sigma_{12} }}.$$

If the two groups are independent,

$$\beta =  \frac{\mu_1 - \mu_2}{\sqrt{\sigma_1^2 + \sigma_2^2 }}.$$

If the two independent groups have equal variances $\sigma^2$,

$$\beta =  \frac{\mu_1 - \mu_2}{\sqrt{2}\sigma}.$$

In the situation where the two groups are correlated, a commonly used strategy to avoid the calculation of $\sigma_{12}$ is first to obtain paired observations from the two groups and then to estimate SSMD based on the paired observations. Based on a paired difference $D$ with population mean $\mu_D$ and $\sigma_D^2$, SSMD is

$$\beta =  \frac{\mu_D}{\sigma_D}.$$

=== Statistical estimation ===
In the situation where the two groups are independent, Zhang XHD derived the maximum-likelihood estimate (MLE) and method-of-moment (MM) estimate of SSMD. Assume that groups 1 and 2 have sample mean $\bar{X}_1, \bar{X}_2$, and sample variances $s_1^2, s_2^2$. The MM estimate of SSMD is then

$$\hat{\beta} =  \frac{\bar{X}_1 - \bar{X}_2}{\sqrt{s_1^2+s_2^2}}.$$

When the two groups have normal distributions with equal variance, the uniformly minimal variance unbiased estimate (UMVUE) of SSMD is,

$$\hat{\beta} =  \frac{\bar{X}_1 - \bar{X}_2}{\sqrt{\frac{2} {K} ((n_1-1) s_1^2 + (n_2-1) s_2^2)}},$$

where $n_1, n_2$ are the sample sizes in the two groups and $K \approx n_1 + n_2 - 3.48$.

In the situation where the two groups are correlated, based on a paired difference with a sample size $n$, sample mean $\bar{D}$ and sample variance $s_D^2$, the MM estimate of SSMD is

$$\hat{\beta} =  \frac{\bar{D}}{s_D}.$$

The UMVUE estimate of SSMD is

$$\hat{\beta} =  \frac{\Gamma(\frac{n-1}{2})}{\Gamma(\frac{n-2}{2})} \sqrt{\frac{2}{n-1}} \frac{\bar{D}}{s_D}.$$

SSMD looks similar to t-statistic and Cohen's d, but they are different with one another as illustrated in.

== Application in high-throughput screening assays ==
SSMD is the ratio of mean to the standard deviation of the difference between two groups. When the data is preprocessed using log-transformation as we normally do in HTS experiments, SSMD is the mean of log fold change divided by the standard deviation of log fold change with respect to a negative reference. In other words, SSMD is the average fold change (on the log scale) penalized by the variability of fold change (on the log scale) . For quality control, one index for the quality of an HTS assay is the magnitude of difference between a positive control and a negative reference in an assay plate. For hit selection, the size of effects of a compound (i.e., a small molecule or an siRNA) is represented by the magnitude of difference between the compound and a negative reference. SSMD directly measures the magnitude of difference between two groups. Therefore, SSMD can be used for both quality control and hit selection in HTS experiments.

=== Quality control ===
The number of wells for the positive and negative controls in a plate in the 384-well or 1536-well platform is normally designed to be reasonably large . Assume that the positive and negative controls in a plate have sample mean $\bar{X}_P, \bar{X}_N$, sample variances $s_P^2, s_N^2$, and sample sizes $n_P, n_N$. Usually, the assumption that the controls have equal variance in a plate holds. In such a case, The SSMD for assessing quality in that plate is estimated as

$$\hat{\beta} =  \frac{\bar{X}_P - \bar{X}_N}{\sqrt{\frac{2} {K} ((n_P-1) s_P^2 + (n_N-1) s_N^2)}},$$

where $K \approx n_P + n_N - 3.48$. When the assumption of equal variance does not hold, the SSMD for assessing quality in that plate is estimated as

$$\hat{\beta} =  \frac{\bar{X}_P - \bar{X}_N}{\sqrt{s_P^2+s_N^2}}.$$

If there are clearly outliers in the controls, the SSMD can be estimated as

$$\hat{\beta} =  \frac{\tilde{X}_P - \tilde{X}_N}{1.4826 \sqrt{\tilde{s}_P^2 + \tilde{s}_N^2}},$$

where $\tilde{X}_P, \tilde{X}_N, \tilde{s}_P, \tilde{s}_N$ are the medians and median absolute deviations in the positive and negative controls, respectively.

The Z-factor based QC criterion is popularly used in HTS assays. However, it has been demonstrated that this QC criterion is most suitable for an assay with very or extremely strong positive controls. In an RNAi HTS assay, a strong or moderate positive control is usually more instructive than a very or extremely strong positive control because the effectiveness of this control is more similar to the hits of interest. In addition, the positive controls in the two HTS experiments theoretically have different sizes of effects. Consequently, the QC thresholds for the moderate control should be different from those for the strong control in these two experiments. Furthermore, it is common that two or more positive controls are adopted in a single experiment. Applying the same Z-factor-based QC criteria to both controls leads to inconsistent results as illustrated in the literatures.

The SSMD-based QC criteria listed in the following table take into account the effect size of a positive control in an HTS assay where the positive control (such as an inhibition control) theoretically has values less than the negative reference.

Quality Type	A: Moderate Control	B: Strong Control	C: Very Strong Control	D: Extremely Strong Control
Excellent	$\beta \le -2$	$\beta \le -3$	$\beta \le -5$	$\beta \le -7$
Good	$-2 < \beta \le -1$	$-3 < \beta \le -2$	$-5 < \beta \le -3$	$-7 < \beta \le -5$
Inferior	$-1 < \beta \le -0.5$	$-2 < \beta \le -1$	$-3 < \beta \le -2$	$-5 < \beta \le -3$
Poor	$\beta > -0.5$	$\beta > -1$	$\beta > -2$	$\beta > -3$

In application, if the effect size of a positive control is known biologically, adopt the corresponding criterion based on this table. Otherwise, the following strategy should help to determine which QC criterion should be applied: (i) in many small molecule HTS assay with one positive control, usually criterion D (and occasionally criterion C) should be adopted because this control usually has very or extremely strong effects; (ii) for RNAi HTS assays in which cell viability is the measured response, criterion D should be adopted for the controls without cells (namely, the wells with no cells added) or background controls; (iii) in a viral assay in which the amount of viruses in host cells is the interest, criterion C is usually used, and criterion D is occasionally used for the positive control consisting of siRNA from the virus.

Similar SSMD-based QC criteria can be constructed for an HTS assay where the positive control (such as an activation control) theoretically has values greater than the negative reference. More details about how to apply SSMD-based QC criteria in HTS experiments can be found in a book.

=== Hit selection ===
In an HTS assay, one primary goal is to select compounds with a desired size of inhibition or activation effect. The size of the compound effect is represented by the magnitude of difference between a test compound and a negative reference group with no specific inhibition/activation effects. A compound with a desired size of effects in an HTS screen is called a hit. The process of selecting hits is called hit selection. There are two main strategies of selecting hits with large effects. One is to use certain metric(s) to rank and/or classify the compounds by their effects and then to select the largest number of potent compounds that is practical for validation assays. The other strategy is to test whether a compound has effects strong enough to reach a pre-set level. In this strategy, false-negative rates (FNRs) and/or false-positive rates (FPRs) must be controlled.

SSMD can not only rank the size of effects but also classify effects as shown in the following table based on the population value ($\beta$) of SSMD.

Effect subtype	Thresholds for negative SSMD	Thresholds for positive SSMD
Extremely strong	$\beta \le -5$	$\beta \ge 5$
Very strong	$-5 < \beta \le -3$	$5 > \beta \ge 3$
Strong	$-3 < \beta \le -2$	$3 > \beta \ge 2$
Fairly strong	$-2 < \beta \le -1.645$	$2 > \beta \ge 1.645$
Moderate	$-1.645 < \beta \le -1.28$	$1.645 > \beta \ge 1.28$
Fairly moderate	$-1.28 < \beta \le -1$	$1.28 > \beta \ge 1$
Fairly weak	$-1 < \beta \le -0.75$	$1 > \beta \ge 0.75$
Weak	$-0.75 < \beta < -0.5$	$0.75 > \beta > 0.5$
Very weak	$-0.5 \le \beta < -0.25$	$0.5 \ge \beta > 0.25$
Extremely weak	$-0.25 \le \beta < 0$	$0.25 \ge \beta > 0$
No effect	$\beta = 0$	

The estimation of SSMD for screens without replicates differs from that for screens with replicates.

In a primary screen without replicates, assuming the measured value (usually on the log scale) in a well for a tested compound is $X_i$ and the negative reference in that plate has sample size $n_N$, sample mean $\bar{X}_N$, median $\tilde{X}_N$, standard deviation $s_N$ and median absolute deviation $\tilde{s}_N$, the SSMD for this compound is estimated as

$$\text{SSMD}= \frac{X_i - \bar{X}_N}{s_N \sqrt{2(n_N-1)/K}},$$

where $K \approx n_N-2.48$. When there are outliers in an assay which is usually common in HTS experiments, a robust version of SSMD can be obtained using

$$\text{SSMD*}= \frac{X_i - \tilde{X}_N}{1.4826\tilde{s}_N \sqrt{2(n_N-1)/K}}$$

In a confirmatory or primary screen with replicates, for the i-th test compound with $n$ replicates, we calculate the paired difference between the measured value (usually on the log scale) of the compound and the median value of a negative control in a plate, then obtain the mean $\bar{d}_i$ and variance $s_i^2$ of the paired difference across replicates. The SSMD for this compound is estimated as

$$\text{SSMD}= \frac{\Gamma(\frac{n-1}{2})}{\Gamma(\frac{n-2}{2})} \sqrt{\frac{2}{n-1}} \frac{\bar{d}_i}{s_i}$$

In many cases, scientists may use both SSMD and average fold change for hit selection in HTS experiments. The dual-flashlight plot can display both average fold change and SSMD for all test compounds in an assay and help to integrate both of them to select hits in HTS experiments . The use of SSMD for hit selection in HTS experiments is illustrated step-by-step in

== See also ==
- Effect size
- high-throughput screening
- Z-factor
- Hit selection
- SMCV
- c^{+}-probability
- Contrast variable
- Dual-flashlight plot
