= LFC =

LFC may refer to:

== Association football clubs ==
- In women's association football, a ladies' football club (with suffix L.F.C.)
- Vancouver Whitecaps FC (MLS), Canada
- Laos F.C., Philippines
- Laurelvale F.C., Northern Ireland
- Larne F.C., Northern Ireland
- Lewes F.C., south-east England
- Limoges FC, France
- Linfield F.C., Northern Ireland
- Linköpings FC, Sweden
- Liverpool F.C., north-west England
- Livingston F.C., Scotland
- Loughgall F.C., Northern Ireland

== Education ==
- Lake Forest College, Illinois, U.S.
- Landau Forte College, Derby, England
- Lycée Français du Caire, Cairo, Egypt

== Military ==
- Canadian Forces Land Force Command, a former name of the Canadian Army
- Légion française des combattants (French Legion of Fighters), an organization of the Vichy regime, parent of the Service d'ordre légionnaire

== Science and technology ==
- Level of free convection, a specific altitude in the atmosphere
- Lingua Franca Core, a set of English pronunciation features
- Lost-foam casting, a type of evaporative-pattern casting process
- Low Framerate Compensation, a software technique used in the drivers for AMD's Radeon graphics cards
- Log Fold change

== Other uses ==
- León Febres Cordero, former President of Ecuador
- Los Fabulosos Cadillacs, an Argentine band
- Lutheran Free Church a US-based Lutheran church from 1897 to 1963
