= Henry Widdowson =

Applied linguist and professor (born 1935)

- Born: 28 May 1935; Leicester
- Education: University of Edinburgh, King's College, Alderman Newton's School
- Occupations: Linguist, researcher, professor
- Employers: Journal of Applied Linguistics (1980–1985); British Council (1962–1968); University of Edinburgh (1969–1977); University of Essex (1993–1998); University of London (1977–1998); University of Vienna (1998–2001)
- Awards: honorary doctorate at the Lorraine university (University of Lorraine, 2012); Lifetime Achievement Award (British Council, Henry Widdowson, 2015); Austrian Decoration for Science and Art First Class (Austria, Henry Widdowson, 2015)

Henry George Widdowson (born 28 May 1935, in Leicester, England) is an applied linguist, internationally well known for his ideas about discourse and the nature of communication in relation to a wide range of areas of English study, including literary stylistics, critical discourse analysis, and English language education. He is an Emeritus Professor of Education at the University of London, an Honorary Professor of English Linguistics at the University of Vienna.

In the early 1990s, he collaborated with Barbara Seidlhofer in initiating enquiry into the description of English as a Lingua Franca (ELF), and its significance as a global means of communication both for disciplinary study of language and for the pedagogy of its teaching. In 2015, he received the British Council's Lifetime Achievement Award in recognition of his research and his wider involvement in the English Language Teaching (ELT) community.

== Career ==
Widdowson was educated at Alderman Newton's School in Leicester. Later he studied English, French and German literature for his first degree at King’s College, Cambridge (1953-1956). In November 1958, after two years of military service in the Royal Navy, he took the post of lecturer in English literature at the University of Indonesia in Jakarta. In early 1962 he joined the British Council, first as an Education Officer in Sri Lanka, then as an English Language Officer in Bangladesh. In 1964, the British Council sent him to follow a diploma course in applied linguistics in Edinburgh. In 1965, he returned to his post in Bangladesh where he sought to put into practice his ideas of English for specific purposes (ESP) which had been initially explored in his Edinburgh diploma thesis: “The teaching of English through science”. This experience persuaded him of the need for further research into discourse analysis. He left the British Council in 1969 to take up a temporary lectureship to do a PhD in Edinburgh under the supervision of Pit Corder. In 1971, he successfully applied for a permanent lecturer post there and gained a PhD in the subject at the same institution in 1973.

In 1977, he left Edinburgh to take up the chair of English as a Foreign Language at the University of London Institute of Education. In 1980, together with Patrick Allen and Bernard Spolsky, he launched the new journal Applied Linguistics. At about the same time, he became chairman of the British Council’s English Teaching Advisory Committee. Between 1980 and 2008, he was the advisor for Applied Linguistics publishing at the Oxford University Press.

Between 1983 and 1986, together with Ann Brumfit, Scott Windeatt and Christopher Hyde, he has written several books of activities designed to make learners aware of the significance of grammar as a communicative resource. The rational of their design appeared later as Chapter 10 of his book Aspects of Language Teaching (1990). In 1992, he spent a sabbatical term at the University of Vienna, and on his return early in 1993 he accepted the part-time post of professor of applied linguistics at the University of Essex. This change of employment coincided with an extension in the scope of his academic work as this related to discourse analysis and corpus linguistics as well.

In 1995, Widdowson began working on a new series: the Oxford Introductions to Language Study. In this series, he and his colleagues presented their areas of expertise to enable pre-service and in-service teachers, students in general to critically appraise the ideas and findings of linguistics and related disciplines, and to give them a clear understanding of what these ideas and findings are. Over ten years, a dozen titles appeared at fairly regular intervals: Henry Widdowson on Linguistics (1996) and George Yule on Pragmatics (1996) were followed by Bernard Spolsky on Sociolinguistics (1998), Thomas Scovel on Psycholinguistics (1998), Rod Ellis on Second Language Acquisition (1997), Claire Kramsch on Language and Culture (1998), Peter Roach on Phonetics (2001), Peter Verdonk on Stylistics (2002), Tim McNamara on Language Testing (2000), Herbert Schendl on Historical Linguistics (2001), Guy Cook on Applied Linguistics (2003), Michael Swan on Grammar (2005), Henry George Widdowson Discourse Analysis (2007).

He took early retirement from his positions in Essex and London in 1998. Since 1998, he is Emeritus Professor of Education, University of London, and Emeritus Professor of Applied Linguistics at the University of Essex. From 1998 to 2001 he has been Professor of English Linguistics at the University of Vienna, where he now holds an Honorary Professorship (Department of English). Since the 1990s, Widdowson lives and works in Vienna, Austria. Widdowson is co-editor of Language Teaching: A Scheme for Teacher Education (1987). He has also published such seminal works as On the subject of English: the Linguistics of Language Use and Learning (2020), Text, Context, Pretext: Critical Issues in Discourse Analysis (2004), Defining Issues in English Language Teaching (2003), and Practical Stylistics: An Approach to Poetry (1992).

== Research ==
Widdowson’s early career is perhaps best known for his contribution to applied linguistics and communicative language teaching. However, his later theorising on discourse covers a wide range of areas of language use and communication. Hence, he has published on such subjects as discourse analysis, critical discourse analysis, the global spread of English, English as a lingua franca, English for Special Purposes, literary criticism, stylistics and many others.

Widdowson has been fascinated by the English language since childhood, and his entire career can be seen as a personal exploration of the mysteries of English and language use in general. Later, Widdowson's interest in research was motivated by his personal experience of teaching English literature to students in Jakarta in the 1970s, and thus involved 'the theoretical and empirical investigation of real-world problems in which language is a central issue'. This academic expertise in the teaching experience was reflected in his dissertation, 'The Teaching of English through Science', which appeared in 1968 as his first publication in the Language and Language Learning series (edited by Ronald Mackin and Peter Strevens). Here he pioneered the ideas now known as English for Specific Purposes (ESP) and Content and Language Integrated Learning (CLIL).

His PhD thesis titled “An applied linguistic approach to discourse analysis” was prompted by the same problem of ESP. But the relevance of what have emerged from the research was far from being confined to ESP. This dissertation can be claimed to be the first of its kind in the field of discourse analysis. It is an enquiry into nature of language use and the pragmatics of discourse in general. The research addresses the question about the relationship between textual analysis and discourse interpretation and suggests that this question comes up in any area of language use, in general, and in language teaching and learning in particular.

Widdowson’s theoretical bearings on the nature of language and language use concern the of three main issues, which recur throughout his inquiry and writing:

1. The first issue concerns how applied linguistics has been defined and practised. His view is that representing it as an academic discipline has distracted it from its essential purpose to engage with problems that are actually experienced by language users and learners in the real world. He has consistently argued that only if this experience is given primary focus, can the relevance of disciplinary expertise be locally determined. It cannot be presumed in advance.
2. The second issue has to do with the nature of discourse in general. Widdowson’s applied linguistic approach to discourse analysis and the theoretical study of discourse in relation to various areas of applied linguistics provides a conceptual distinction between text and discourse, which describes the relation between the two as that of product and process. Thus, text is a linguistic trace of discourse. Discourse is the pragmatic process of meaning negotiation. A related crucial point is that texts need to be connected to discourse and discourse community. According to Widdowson, this connection is indirectly mediated by contextual conventions and pretextual purposes. As Widdowson puts it, “Unless it is activated by this contextual connection, the text is inert. It is this activation, this acting of context on code, this indexical conversion of the symbol that I refer to discourse". The concept of pretext as one more factor in the general interpretative process refers to “an ulterior motive” in engaging in communication. In this view, any language use is to be treated as that that is used to activate and ratify particular contexts (sociocultural conventions and constructs), and at the same time to achieve particular pretexts or interactive purposes that manage the relationship between the conversational parties. Finally, making the distinction between two sets of concepts, Widdowson argues strongly that text must be associated with analysis, and discourse and its factors (context, and pretext) with interpretation. That is to say, the recognition of the purpose of a text or utterance depends on contextual but also on pretextual factors. These pretextual factors regulate not only the parties’ but also the analyst’s focus of attention on the textual features to be analysed and the contextual factors to be considered.
3. The third area concerns the two research fields of linguistics and study of literature. Widdowson’s argument is that there is a need for reconciliation of the two fields that are often institutionally put into opposition. Widdowson's argument here is that the relationship between the two fields is again has to do with the question of what are the textual constraints that set limits on interpretation, and to what extent certain interpretations can be privileged or disallowed (by fiat). He takes the view that a linguistics that cannot account for literary uses of language, or a study of literature uninformed by linguistics are both bound to be of limited validity. Widdowson has authored a number of highly influential papers and books such as Teaching language as communication (1978), Explorations in Applied Linguistics (1984-1990), Aspects of language teaching (1990), Defining Issues in English Language Teaching (2003), Text, Context, Pretext: Critical Issues in Discourse Analysis (2004), Discourse Analysis (2007), and most recently On the Subject of English (2020).

Widdowson is perhaps best known for his contribution to communicative language teaching. However, he has also published on other related subjects such as discourse analysis and critical discourse analysis, the global spread of English, English for Special Purposes and stylistics.The Routledge Encyclopedia of Language Teaching and Learning calls him "probably the most influential philosopher of the late twentieth century for international ESOL". He has authored a number of highly influential papers. His 1994 paper in TESOL Quarterly, for instance, has become a key paper in the rationale behind English as a lingua franca and what has become known as the "ownership" of English.

== Selected books ==
- Widdowson, H. (2019). On the subject of English: the linguistics of language use and learning (1st ed.). De Gruyter Mouton.
- Widdowson, H. (2007). Discourse Analysis (Oxford Introduction to Language Study Series). Oxford University Press.
- Widdowson, H. (2004). Text, Context, Pretext: Critical Issues in Discourse Analysis (1st ed.). Blackwell Publishing.
- Widdowson, H. (2003). Defining Issues in English Language Teaching (Oxford Applied Linguistics) (1st ed.). Oxford University Press.
- Widdowson, H. (1996). Linguistics (Oxford Introduction to Language Study) (1st ed.). Oxford University Press.
- Widdowson, H. (1992). Practical Stylistics: An Approach to Poetry (Oxford Applied Linguistics) (1st ed.). Oxford University Press.
- Widdowson, H. (1990). Aspects of Language Teaching (Oxford Applied Linguistics) (1st ed.). Oxford University Press.
- Howatt, A.P.R. and Widdowson, H.G. (1984). A History of English Language Teaching (1st ed.). Oxford University Press.
- Widdowson, H. G. (1978). Explorations in applied linguistics (1st ed.). Oxford University Press.
- Widdowson, H. G. (1978). Teaching Language as Communication (Oxford Applied Linguistics) (1st ed.). Oxford University Press.
- Widdowson, H. G. (1975). Stylistics and the Teaching of Literature (Applied Linguistics and Language Study) (1st ed.). Routledge.

== Articles (brief extract) ==
- Widdowson, Henry G. (2026) "WE, ELF and ELT: Perspectives on English and applied linguistics." World Englishes 1-10.
- Widdowson, Henry G. (2015) "ELF and the pragmatics of language variation" Journal of English as a Lingua Franca, 4/2, 359-372.
- Widdowson, Henry G. (2012) "ELF and the inconvenience of established concepts" Journal of English as a Lingua Franca 1/1. 5-26.
- Widdowson, Henry G. (1998a) " EIL: squaring the Circles. A Reply." World Englishes 17/3 397–401.
- Widdowson, Henry G. (1998b) "Communication and Community. The Pragmatics of ESP." English for Specific Purposes 17/1 3–14.
- Widdowson, Henry G. (1998c) "The Theory and Practice of Critical Discourse Analysis." Applied Linguistics 19/1 136–151.
- Widdowson, Henry G. (1997) "EIL, ESL, EFL: global Issues and local Interests". World Englishes 16/1. 146–53.
- Widdowson, Henry G. (1994) "The Ownership of English". TESOL Quarterly 28/2 377–89.
- Widdowson, Henry G. (1993) "Proper Words in proper Places." ELT Journal 47/4. 317–329.
- Widdowson, Henry G. (1992) "ELT and EL Teacher." ELT Journal 46/4. 333–339.
