= Barbara Seidlhofer =

Austrian linguist

- Known for: Vienna-Oxford International Corpus of English (VOICE); founding the Journal of English as a Lingua Franca
- Awards: Wilhelm Hartel Prize (2021)

Academic background
- Education: University of Vienna (Mag., Habilitation); University of London (MA, PhD)
- Doctoral advisor: Henry Widdowson

Academic work
- Discipline: Applied linguistics, sociolinguistics, corpus linguistics
- Sub-discipline: English as a lingua franca
- Institutions: University of Vienna

Barbara Seidlhofer is an Austrian applied linguist and retired professor of English and Applied Linguistics at the University of Vienna. She is regarded as one of the founding figures of the research field of English as a lingua franca (ELF) and is the founding director of the Vienna-Oxford International Corpus of English (VOICE), the first general corpus of spoken ELF. In 2021 she received the Wilhelm Hartel Prize of the Austrian Academy of Sciences in recognition of her life's work.

== Education and career ==
Seidlhofer studied English and Italian at the University of Vienna, qualifying as a secondary school teacher and completing her Magister degree in 1982. She then went to the Institute of Education, University of London, where she obtained an MA in Language and Literature in Education in 1984 and a PhD in Applied Linguistics in 1991 under the supervision of Henry Widdowson. Her doctoral thesis, Approaches to Summarization: Discourse Analysis and Language Education, was published in 1995.

Seidlhofer returned to the University of Vienna, where she completed her Habilitation in English Linguistics in 2001. In 2005 she was appointed full professor (Universitätsprofessorin) of English Applied Linguistics, a position she held until her retirement in 2021. She has taught German in the United Kingdom and has taught extensively in Diploma, BA, and MA programmes in English linguistics at the University of Vienna.

Seidlhofer served as Head of the Department of English and American Studies at the University of Vienna in 2007–2008, 2011, and 2012–2014, and as Deputy Head in 2004–2006 and 2008–2012. From 2018 to 2020 she was Vice-Director of the Doctoral Studies programme.

== Research ==
Seidlhofer's research spans sociolinguistics, pragmatics, discourse analysis, phonetics and phonology, corpus linguistics, and intercultural communication, with a particular focus on English as a lingua franca (ELF). She is widely credited with identifying the "conceptual gap" in the study of English – the absence of systematic descriptions of English as it is used by speakers of different first languages as a lingua franca – in a seminal 2001 article in the International Journal of Applied Linguistics, which has been cited over 2,000 times.

=== Vienna-Oxford International Corpus of English (VOICE) ===
Seidlhofer is the founding director of VOICE, the first computer-readable corpus of spoken English as a lingua franca. Funded primarily by the Austrian Science Fund (FWF), with supplementary funding from Oxford University Press, the corpus was compiled between 2001 and 2009 and comprises approximately one million words of transcribed spoken ELF interactions drawn from professional, educational, and leisure domains. VOICE was released online in 2009 (version 1.0) and later as an XML version (2.0) in 2013, and has subsequently been re-released as VOICE 3.0 through the Austrian Academy of Sciences' Austrian Centre for Digital Humanities and Cultural Heritage (ACDH-CH). VOICE inspired the creation of other major ELF corpora, including the ELFA corpus at the University of Helsinki and the Asian Corpus of English (ACE).

=== DYLAN project ===
From 2006 to 2011, Seidlhofer served as project director of Work Package 4.2 ("Emergent varieties") of the EU Framework Programme 6 project DYLAN (Language Dynamics and Management of Diversity), a large-scale collaborative project studying multilingualism and language management in Europe.

== Selected publications ==
Seidlhofer's monograph Understanding English as a Lingua Franca (Oxford University Press, 2011) is a widely cited standard reference in the field; in 2013 it was listed among the 28 most influential publications by Austrian scholars across all academic disciplines in the preceding decade. Her other major publications include:

- Controversies in Applied Linguistics (Oxford University Press, 2003)
- Principle and Practice in Applied Linguistics: Studies in Honour of H. G. Widdowson (co-edited with Guy Cook; Oxford University Press, 1995)
- Pronunciation (co-authored with Christiane Dalton; in the series Language Teaching: A Scheme for Teacher Education; Oxford University Press, 1994)
- "Research perspectives on teaching English as a lingua franca", Annual Review of Applied Linguistics 24, 209–239 (2004)

According to Google Scholar, Seidlhofer's publications have received over 21,000 citations, and she has an h-index of 47.

== Journal editorships ==
Seidlhofer is the founding editor of the Journal of English as a Lingua Franca (JELF), published by De Gruyter Mouton, the first international journal devoted to ELF research. She served as its founding editor from 2012 to 2019 and holds the title of honorary editor. She also served as editor of the International Journal of Applied Linguistics (Wiley-Blackwell) from 2004 to 2008.

== Professional service ==
Seidlhofer was the Austrian national representative on the International Committee of AILA (Association Internationale de Linguistique Appliquée) from 1999 to 2017 and served as president of verbal (Verband für Angewandte Linguistik Österreich / Austrian Association for Applied Linguistics) from 2002 to 2006.

== Honours ==
- Wilhelm Hartel Prize (2021), awarded by the Austrian Academy of Sciences for outstanding lifetime achievement in the humanities and social sciences, in recognition of her foundational contributions to the establishment and development of ELF as a field of research.
