= Founder cell =

Founder Cells

A founder cell is the first cell that is differentiated in the first steps of organogenesis. The differentiation arises from the asymmetric division of stem cells, resulting in the formation of a daughter stem cell and a specialized cell type. There is one founder cell for each tissue and organ formed during organogenesis. Upon specification of a stem cell, the resulting founder cell is inactive and must be activated before growth and formation of the tissue.

Founder cells are formed during embryonic development as the asymmetric division of cells occurs within the zygote. These founder cells lead to the formation of ectoderm, mesoderm, endoderm, and germ line. These cell types are then further differentiated into more specific founder cells that are responsible for all tissue types including brain, skin, muscle, organs, and sex cells

Due to the stage of development during which founder cells are found, accurately counting them is challenging and prior studies have estimated that mice have 2 to 9 founder cells that lead to the formation of a germ cell line, while another study has estimated that, in humans, there are 2 to 3 founder cells responsible for germ line formation.

== Specification and activation ==
Specification of a stem cell enables the response to activating signals. In other words, without specification for the formation of the founder cell, the activating factors have no effect and no tissue will be formed.

=== Specification ===
Specification occurs due to both chemical and physical interactions. Chemical signals could be those that are secreted by other cells or those that are present in the extracellular environment. These chemical signals are received by receptors on the cell membrane or cell wall, in the case of plants. Physical interactions could be due to contact between adjacent cells or due to alterations of either the cell membrane or the cell wall. These interactions lead to signal cascades that result in a change in gene expression , which in turn, results in a change in physiology.

=== Activation ===
Specification results in an inactive founder cell that will not divide to form a tissue. A signal must be received to trigger cell proliferation to complete the process of organogenesis. The signal does not have to be the same as the signal for specification, as the process of activation is separated from that of specification

== Medical relevance ==
=== Bacterial infections ===
In the case of bacterial biofilms, at high initial quantities of founder cells, competition between different strains can be reliably predicted and often results in a 1:1 ratio of the strains separated spatially. In the biologically relevant cases of low founder cell density, the competitive outcomes vary, with results ranging from full spatial takeover of either strain or 1:1 mixing of the strains. In the case of bacterial infections, low founder cells can result in the lack or reduction of polymicrobial infections, making treatment potentially more manageable.

=== Therapeutic applications ===
In vitro, founder cells have been used to generate tissues for research on tissues and their functions. These laboratory generated tissues can also be applied as a potential stem cell based therapy, such as those used to treat blood and liver diseases.

In the case of severe liver damage due to disease, injury, or surgery, these artificially produced tissues can be produced by specifying a stem cell from the host individual into a hepatocyte , which can then be implemented to promote regeneration of the liver, as the liver is capable of regeneration.

In other founder cell based therapies, such as in the treatment of blood diseases, a stem cell can be specialized into the appropriate cell type and the resulting founder cell can be proliferated to form functional tissues. Blood stem cells can form founder cells to make tissues composed of white, red, or platelet blood cells, where the resulting tissue can be utilized in the treatment of diseases such as sickle cell disease.

=== Therapeutic disadvantages ===
Founder cell therapies can require the patient to take immunosuppressants as there is a possibility that the immune system of the body to attacks the grafted tissue, potentially leading to a worsening of organ condition relative to before the therapy.

Other complications that may arise include low blood cell counts, which in turn can increase risks of anemia, infection, bruising, fatigue, and many other side effects. It is also possible that infections or the side effects of medicine can cause digestive, pulmonary, cardiovascular, renal, and many other system complications, along with pain in tissues surrounding the area of therapy.

It is also possible to develop fertility issues as potential radiation or chemotherapy administered prior to the therapy has the ability to cause damage to the patient's gonads.

The graft may also not be a successful therapy. This could be due to the failure of the cells to replicate and grow to help with repair, or due to an allergic reaction in which the recipient's immune system deems the graft as an infection and begins to attack it to prevent its growth and cell proliferation.
