= C+-probability =

In statistics, a c^{+}-probability is the probability that a contrast variable obtains a positive value. Using a replication probability, the c^{+}-probability is defined as follows: if we get a random draw from each group (or factor level) and calculate the sampled value of the contrast variable based on the random draws, then the c^{+}-probability is the chance that the sampled values of the contrast variable are greater than 0 when the random drawing process is repeated infinite times. The c^{+}-probability is a probabilistic index accounting for distributions of compared groups (or factor levels).

The c^{+}-probability and SMCV are two characteristics of a contrast variable. There is a link between SMCV and c^{+}-probability. The SMCV and c^{+}-probability provides a consistent interpretation to the strength of comparisons in contrast analysis. When only two groups are involved in a comparison, the c^{+}-probability becomes d^{+}-probability which is the probability that the difference of values from two groups is positive. To some extent, the d^{+}-probability (especially in the independent situations) is equivalent to the well-established probabilistic index P(X > Y). Historically, the index P(X > Y) has been studied and applied in many areas. The c^{+}-probability and d^{+}-probability have been used for data analysis in high-throughput experiments and biopharmaceutical research.

== See also ==
- Contrast (statistics)
- Effect size
- SSMD
- SMCV
- Contrast variable
- ANOVA
