= Volcano plot =

Volcano plot may refer to:

- Volcano plot (statistics), a type of scatter-plot used to identify changes in large data sets
- Volcano plot in chemistry, signifying the Sabatier principle, a qualitative concept in heterogeneous catalysis
