= Colony picker =

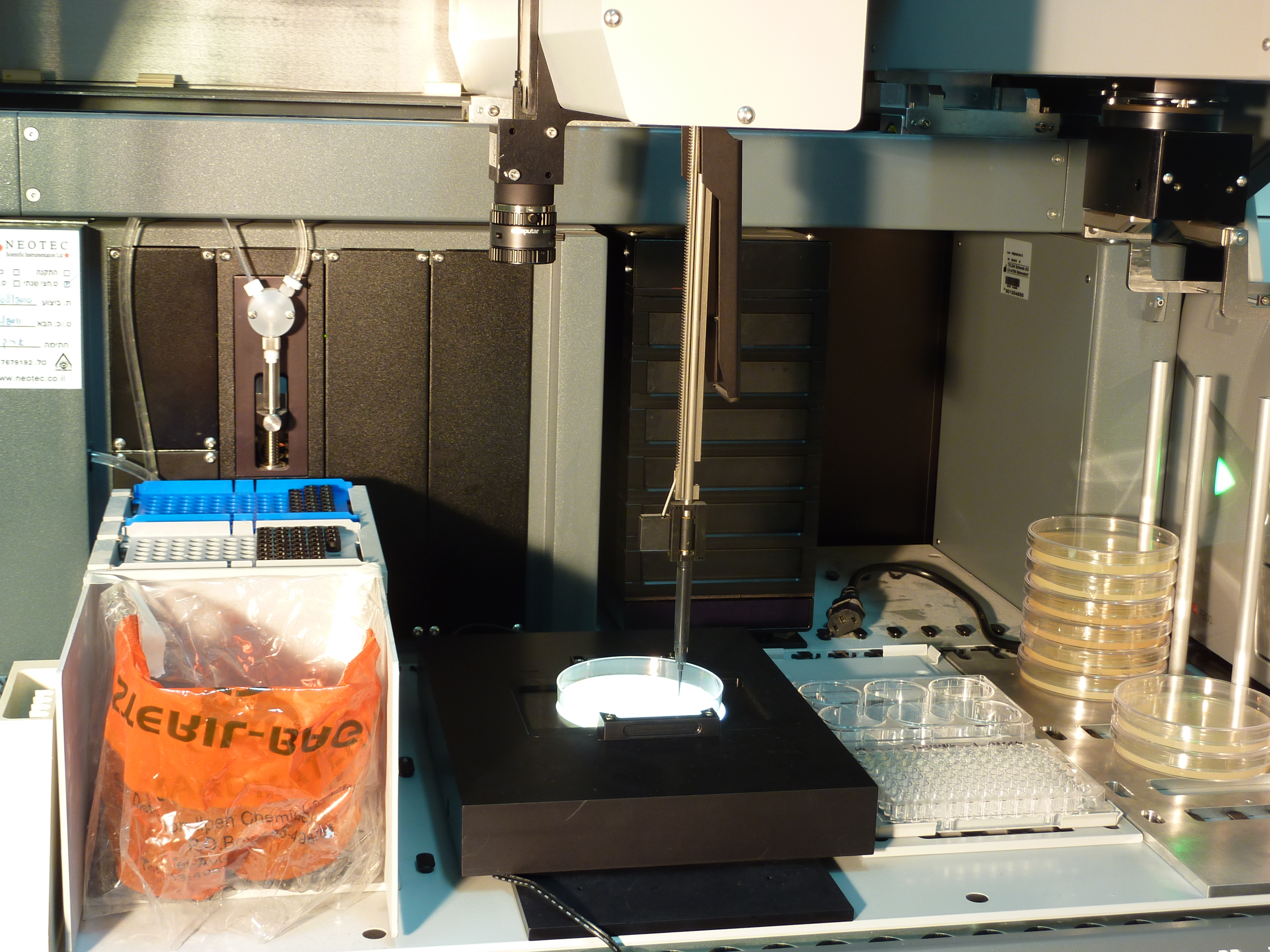
Pickolo - an automatic colony picker add-on for a Tecan robot shown in a typical setup. A petri plate is placed on a light table (bottom). The camera (top) is used to photograph the plate and image analysis algorithms used to choose the right colonies to pick. A disposable tip (taken from the rack on the left) is used to touch each colony and transfer it to a collection plate (bottom right). In a fully automatic setup, a plate stacker (right) is used to process many plates in a serial manner.

A colony picker is an instrument used to automatically identify microbial colonies growing on a solid medium, pick them and duplicate them either onto solid or liquid media. It is used in research laboratories as well as in industrial environments such as food testing and in microbiological cultures.

== Uses ==
In food safety and in clinical diagnosis colony picking is used to isolate individual colonies for identification. Colony pickers automate this procedure, saving costs and personnel and reducing human error. In the drug discovery process they are used for screening purposes by picking thousands of microbial colonies and transferring them for further testing. Other uses include cloning procedures and DNA sequencing.

== As add-on ==
Colony pickers are sold either as stand-alone instruments or as add-ons to liquid handling robots, using the robot as the actuator and adding a camera and image analysis capabilities. This strategy lowers the price of the system considerably and adds reusability as the robot can still be used for other purposes.

== See also ==
- Pick-and-place machine
