= Standardized mean of a contrast variable =

In statistics, the standardized mean of a contrast variable (SMCV or SMC), is a parameter assessing effect size. The SMCV is defined as mean divided by the standard deviation of a contrast variable. The SMCV was first proposed for one-way ANOVA cases and was then extended to multi-factor ANOVA cases.

== Background ==
Consistent interpretations for the strength of group comparison, as represented by a contrast, are important.

When there are only two groups involved in a comparison, SMCV is the same as the strictly standardized mean difference (SSMD). SSMD belongs to a popular type of effect-size measure called "standardized mean differences" which includes Cohen's $d$ and Glass's $\delta.$

In ANOVA, a similar parameter for measuring the strength of group comparison is standardized effect size (SES). One issue with SES is that its values are incomparable for contrasts with different coefficients. SMCV does not have such an issue.

== Concept ==
Suppose the random values in t groups represented by random variables $G_1, G_2, \ldots, G_t$ have means $\mu_1, \mu_2, \ldots, \mu_t$ and variances $\sigma_1^2, \sigma_2^2, \ldots, \sigma_t^2$, respectively. A contrast variable $V$ is defined by

$$V=\sum_{i=1}^t c_i G_i ,$$

where the $c_i$'s are a set of coefficients representing a comparison of interest and satisfy $\sum_{i=1}^t c_i = 0$. The SMCV of contrast variable $V$, denoted by $\lambda$, is defined as

$$\lambda = \frac{\operatorname{E}(V)}{\operatorname{stdev}(V)}
= \frac{\sum_{i=1}^t c_i \mu_i}{\sqrt{\text{Var}\left(\sum_{i=1}^t c_i G_i\right)}}
= \frac{\sum_{i=1}^t c_i \mu_i}{\sqrt{\sum_{i=1}^t c_i^2 \sigma_i^2 + 2\sum_{i=1}^t \sum_{j=i} c_i c_j \sigma_{ij} }}$$

where $\sigma_{ij}$ is the covariance of $G_{i}$ and $G_{j}$. When $G_1, G_2, \ldots, G_t$ are independent,

$$\lambda = \frac{\sum_{i=1}^t c_i \mu_i}{\sqrt{\sum_{i=1}^t c_i^2 \sigma_i^2 }}.$$

== Classifying rule for the strength of group comparisons ==
The population value (denoted by $\lambda$ ) of SMCV can be used to classify the strength of a comparison represented by a contrast variable, as shown in the following table. This classifying rule has a probabilistic basis due to the link between SMCV and c^{+}-probability.

Effect type	Effect subtype	Thresholds for negative SMCV	Thresholds for positive SMCV
Extra large	Extremely strong	$\lambda \le -5$	$\lambda \ge 5$
Extra large	Very strong	$-5 < \lambda \le -3$	$5 > \lambda \ge 3$
Extra large	Strong	$-3 < \lambda \le -2$	$3 > \lambda \ge 2$
Extra large	Fairly strong	$-2 < \lambda \le -1.645$	$2 > \lambda \ge 1.645$
Large	Moderate	$-1.645 < \lambda \le -1.28$	$1.645 > \lambda \ge 1.28$
Large	Fairly moderate	$-1.28 < \lambda \le -1$	$1.28 > \lambda \ge 1$
Medium	Fairly weak	$-1 < \lambda \le -0.75$	$1 > \lambda \ge 0.75$
Medium	Weak	$-0.75 < \lambda < -0.5$	$0.75 > \lambda > 0.5$
Medium	Very weak	$-0.5 \le \lambda < -0.25$	$0.5 \ge \lambda > 0.25$
Small	Extremely weak	$-0.25 \le \lambda < 0$	$0.25 \ge \lambda > 0$
Small	No effect	$\lambda = 0$	

== Statistical estimation and inference ==
The estimation and inference of SMCV presented below is for one-factor experiments. Estimation and inference of SMCV for multi-factor experiments has also been discussed.

The estimation of SMCV relies on how samples are obtained in a study. When the groups are correlated, it is usually difficult to estimate the covariance among groups. In such a case, a good strategy is to obtain matched or paired samples (or subjects) and to conduct contrast analysis based on the matched samples. A simple example of matched contrast analysis is the analysis of paired difference of drug effects after and before taking a drug in the same patients. By contrast, another strategy is to not match or pair the samples and to conduct contrast analysis based on the unmatched or unpaired samples. A simple example of unmatched contrast analysis is the comparison of efficacy between a new drug taken by some patients and a standard drug taken by other patients. Methods of estimation for SMCV and c^{+}-probability in matched contrast analysis may differ from those used in unmatched contrast analysis.

=== Unmatched samples ===
Consider an independent sample of size $n_i$,

$$Y_i = \left(Y_{i1}, Y_{i2}, \ldots, Y_{i n_i}\right)$$

from the $i^\text{th} (i=1, 2, \ldots, t)$ group $G_i$. $Y_i$'s are independent. Let $\bar{Y}_i = \frac{1}{n_i} \sum_{j=1}^{n_i} Y_{ij}$,

$$s_i^2 = \frac{1}{n_i-1} \sum_{j=1}^{n_i} \left(Y_{ij} - \bar{Y}_i\right)^2,$$
$$N = \sum_{i=1}^t n_i$$

and

$$\text{MSE } = \frac{1}{N-t} \sum_{i=1}^t \left(n_i - 1\right)s_i^2.$$

When the $t$ groups have unequal variance, the maximal likelihood estimate (MLE) and method-of-moment estimate (MM) of SMCV ($\lambda$) are, respectively

$$\hat{\lambda}_\text{MLE }
= \frac{\sum_{i=1}^t c_i \bar{Y}_i}{\sqrt{\sum_{i=1}^t \frac{n_i - 1}{n_i}c_i^2 s_i^2 }}$$

and

$$\hat{\lambda}_\text{MM}
= \frac{\sum_{i=1}^t c_i \bar{Y}_i}{\sqrt{\sum_{i=1}^t c_i^2 s_i^2 }}.$$

When the $t$ groups have equal variance, under normality assumption, the uniformly minimal variance unbiased estimate (UMVUE) of SMCV ($\lambda$) is

$$\hat{\lambda}_\text{UMVUE}
= \sqrt\frac{K}{N - t} \frac{\sum_{i=1}^t c_i \bar{Y}_i}{\sqrt{\sum_{i=1}^t \text{MSE } c_i^2}}$$

where $K = \frac{2 \left(\Gamma\left(\frac{N - t}{2}\right)\right)^2}{\left(\Gamma\left(\frac{N - t - 1}{2}\right)\right)^2}$.

The confidence interval of SMCV can be made using the following non-central t-distribution:

$$T = \frac{\sum_{i=1}^t c_i \bar{Y}_i}{\sqrt{\sum_{i=1}^t \text{MSE } c_i^2/n_i}} \sim \text{noncentral } t(N-t, b\lambda)$$

where $b = \sqrt{\frac{\sum_{i=1}^t c_i^2}{\sum_{i=1}^t c_i^2/n_i}}.$

=== Matched samples ===
In matched contrast analysis, assume that there are $n$ independent samples $\left(Y_{1j}, Y_{2j}, \cdots, Y_{tj}\right)$ from $t$ groups ($G_i$'s), where $i = 1, 2, \cdots, t; j = 1, 2, \cdots, n$. Then the $j^\text{th}$ observed value of a contrast $V = \sum_{i=1}^t c_i G_i$ is $v_j = \sum_{i=1}^t c_i Y_i$.

Let $\bar{V}$ and $s_V^2$ be the sample mean and sample variance of the contrast variable $V$, respectively. Under normality assumptions, the UMVUE estimate of SMCV is

$$\hat{\lambda}_\text{UMVUE} = \sqrt\frac{K}{n - 1}\frac{\bar{V}}{s_V}$$

where $K = \frac{2\left(\Gamma\left(\frac{n - 1}{2}\right)\right)^2}{\left(\Gamma\left(\frac{n - 2}{2}\right)\right)^2}.$

A confidence interval for SMCV can be made using the following non-central t-distribution:

$$T = \frac{\bar{V}}{s_V/\sqrt{n}} \sim \text{noncentral } t\left(n - 1, \sqrt{n}\lambda\right).$$

== See also ==
- Dual-flashlight plot
