= Replicate (biology) =

Biological process

In the biological sciences, replicates are an experimental units that are treated identically. Replicates are an essential component of experimental design because they provide an estimate of between sample error. Without replicates, scientists are unable to assess whether observed treatment effects are due to the experimental manipulation or due to random error. There are also analytical replicates which is when an exact copy of a sample is analyzed, such as a cell, organism or molecule, using exactly the same procedure. This is done in order to check for analytical error. In the absence of this type of error replicates should yield the same result. However, analytical replicates are not independent and cannot be used in tests of the hypothesis because they are still the same sample.

== See also ==
- Self-replication
- Fold change
