= English as a lingua franca =

Use of the English language for international communication

English as a lingua franca (ELF) is the use of the English language "as a global means of inter-community communication" and can be understood as "any use of English among speakers of different first languages for whom English is the communicative medium of choice and often the only option". ELF is "defined functionally by its use in intercultural communication rather than formally by its reference to native-speaker norms" whereas English as a second or foreign language aims at meeting native speaker norms and gives prominence to native-speaker cultural aspects.

English became the established global lingua franca in academia after the 1940s (until which French and German were of equal importance) and, by the end of the 20th century, partly by the cultural influence of the United States, had become the dominant lingua franca in all communication. While lingua francas have been used for centuries, what makes ELF a novel phenomenon is the extent to which it is used in spoken, written and computer-mediated communication. ELF research focuses on the pragmatics of variation which is manifest in the variable use of the resources of English for a wide range of globalized purposes, in important formal encounters such as business transactions, international diplomacy and conflict resolution, as well as in informal exchanges between international friends.

== Globalization, geopolitics and ELF ==
Major technological advances in the 21st century have enabled instant global communication. Due to the interconnection of the world, a shared means of communication like English fulfills the need for a global lingua franca. This is because it has spread to large areas of the world due to various factors such as:

- Spread of the Latin script;
- Colonisation, mainly by the British Empire, (Note: Examples by other world powers also exist, such as the United States colonization of the Philippines, among others) thereby making English into the language with the most countries recognizing it as an official language;
- The widespread teaching of English as a second or foreign language;
- The mutual intelligibility of dialects of English
- Spread of Christianity via Christian missions and Christianization;
- The development of the American research university, which enabled the United States to be one of the leaders of the world in the academic development of science, engineering, arts, and humanities;
- Americanization and American manufacturing and exports;
- Consumption and influence of core Anglosphere entertainment industries, including film, music and literature;
- American military and political hegemony over Western Europe due to the American and British victory in World War II, followed by the spread of English to many parts of Eastern Europe and former Eastern Bloc countries after the Revolutions of 1989 and the dissolution of the Soviet Union, with the subsequent enlargement of the European Union encouraging said spread of English; and
- The primarily American-British invention of the Internet, its initial widespread adoption in the United States and core Anglosphere, thus English becoming the most used language on the Internet.

Because of the use of English as a lingua franca in international trade and intercultural communication, native speakers of English are outnumbered by non-native speakers. A consequence of this is a sense of ownership of the language which is shared by different communities. For instance, international communication via ELF has facilitated exchange between China and the rest of the world, thus sustaining international trade. But once a language is appropriated by new communities, it is then adapted to their specific needs. Consequently, the English language is undergoing change, and this change is being brought about mostly by its non-native speakers.

== Features of spoken ELF communication ==
The way English is used as a lingua franca is heavily dependent on the specific situation of use. Generally speaking, ELF interactions concentrate on function rather than form. In other words, communicative efficiency (i.e. getting the message across) is more important than grammatical correctness, provided that the grammar is good enough for the message to be intelligible. As a consequence, ELF interactions are very often hybrid. Speakers accommodate to each other's cultural backgrounds and may also use code-switching into other languages that they know. Based on the Vienna-Oxford International Corpus of English (VOICE) and additional research, the following features of ELF lexicogrammar have been identified:

- shift in the use of articles (including some preference for zero articles) as in our countries have signed agreement about this
- invariant question tags as in you’re very busy today, isn't it? (and use of other similar universal forms)
- treating ‘who’ and ‘which’ as interchangeable relative pronouns, as in the picture who or a person which
- shift of patterns of preposition use, for example we have to study about
- preference for bare and/or full infinitive over the use of gerunds, as in I'm looking forward to see you tomorrow
- extension to the collocational field of words with high semantic generality, for example take an operation
- increased explicitness, for example how long time instead of how long
- exploited redundancy, such as ellipsis of objects/complements of transitive verbs as in "I wanted to go with..." or "You can borrow..."
- genderless and gender-inclusive language, such as the use of the word "they" as a singular pronoun following the pattern of other outer circle genderless languages

However, these features are by no means invariant or “obligatory”. Rather, these forms do not seem to compromise effective communication within an ELF setting when they do occur.

== "Neutrality" of ELF ==
Although some researchers hold that English as a lingua franca is a neutral and culture-free tool, others hold that it carries the culture and language of its speakers. Recent linguistic discussions by ELF experts treat the interactants' cultural and linguistic background as a factor influencing language performance. For Hülmbauer, for instance, “it seems likely that the ELF users develop their own markers of identity (be they a common 'European' or 'international' nature or more individual ones which are created online, depending on the community of practice they are emerging in).” In this view, ELF is multicultural rather than culture-free.

== ELF and the native speaker ==
Existing corpora of ELF (VOICE and ELFA, for example) tend to focus on interactions that involve primarily native speakers (Kimura, 2017). More recently, there have been attempts at creating corpora that include native speakers and systematically explore how they interact with non-native speakers.

In ELF interactions, the importance lies in communication strategies other than nativeness, which can lead to communicative situations where those English native speakers who are not familiar with ELF and/or intercultural communication are at a disadvantage because they do not know how to use English appropriately in these situations.

Most data on ELF interactions has been drawn from the domains of business and higher education, and that in largely European contexts, perhaps factors accounting for the relatively rare instances of miscommunication. Studies of Medical English as a Lingua Franca (MELF) provide opportunities to investigate ELF interactions where communicative precision is critical, and the migration of healthcare practitioners across international borders (a phenomenon consistent with the "deterritorialisation" of ELF generally), has created conditions where MELF interactions are increasingly commonplace. A research study of MELF interactions where nurses negotiated a patient handover simulation indicated that areas of unintelligibility represented a potential threat to patient safety, through misrecognition of vocabulary related to medication, as well as other areas of lexical imprecision.

One study of a Japanese medical English as a lingua franca (MELF) context showed that student doctors made use of empathic accommodation and solicitation strategies to make interactions more intelligible. Applying nonverbal cues was seen as being of importance to encourage simulated patients to express concerns, because silence may be interpreted as a sign of potential problems. Empathic doctor-patient communication then means not only understanding and sympathizing but having the ability to bridge the gap when patients are not willing to talk.

An important issue when discussing ELF is the notion of speakers of ELF being active language users in their own right, who do not need to adhere to native speaker norms but use ELF to meet their communicative needs. Proponents of ELF thus reject the notion that it is a form of ‘deficient’ English, and describe ELF speakers as users of English, not as learners.

== Attitude and motivation ==
Several attitude studies on the topic of English as a foreign language (ELF) have already been conducted. One overarching factor seems to be a discrepancy between perceptions on the role of ELF in everyday interactions all over the globe on the one hand, and the dominance of as well as reliance on native speaker norms on the other hand. Breiteneder argues that learners of EFL often have an integrative motivation for learning and using English since they wish to identify with the culture and values of English native speakers. Thus, native speaker norms occupy a central place if English is studied as a foreign language. In contrast, English as a lingua franca users tend to focus on effective communication with speakers of other linguistic backgrounds. In ELF interactions, intelligibility is key, which may not necessitate an advantage for native speakers (see above).

== Debates in ELF ==
Colin Sowden opened the debate with a paper in which he discusses which version of English to teach to second language (L2) learners. He argues that some ELF scholars want ELF to replace Standard English as the model to be used in learning English.

Sowden claims that Standard English, especially British English, has a colonial baggage that still affects the status of English in post-colonial countries and it is this negative value that has led ELF researchers to an attempt to describe and posit a neutralized version of English and to make it a universal one that belongs to every speaker, both native and second language speakers. Sowden argues that introducing ELF in ELT will lead to differences between schools where this is implemented, and schools which have the freedom to use a native standard model, favouring the latter. He concludes that ELF will not replace Anglo-Saxon native-speaker models in the near future as there are too many constraints linked to ELF. For Sowden, the use of multilingual and local teachers can also be beneficial for L2 learners, as these teachers have knowledge of the local culture and spoken languages and the constraints they have on learning English. The way forward according to Sowden is to focus on communicative ability, not on universal conformity.

Alessia Cogo challenged Sowden's critical paper on ELF in 2012 by stating that his arguments were based on outdated research and a confusion between the terms World Englishes (WE) and ELF. First, she argues that ELF is not one monolithic or single variety, but rather that it is used by highly varied socio-/linguacultural networks which leads to a more fluid use of the language building on the different ways in which people use a language to communicate with each other. Secondly, Cogo draws on the importance of studying accommodation in ELF interactions by emphasising the different ways in which people adjust their English at the level of words, grammar and discourse in ELF communication instead of focusing on the core features of ELF as suggested by Sowden. Here, the speaker's ability to move away from the traditional speech patterns of the native varieties is argued to be an important part of ELF research.

Lastly, Cogo contests Sowden's view on ELF researchers themselves. Sowden argues that ELF researchers encourage ELF speakers to use specific varieties of English over others, an argument that Cogo refutes by stating that researchers only use empirical data to show what happens in ELF interactions, and never to tell speakers what to use. Cogo further cites various studies in the field that have demonstrated that ELF communication is fluid and innovative, with an emphasis on highly variable linguistic forms.

Sewell argued that the debate about ELF between Sowden and Cogo fails to acknowledge the variation that characterises language use today. He claims that it is counterproductive to polarise ELF and non-ELF and native and non-native speakers, as there is great diversity in all areas of English language usage. Whilst recognising Cogo's clarifications regarding several misconceptions of ELF, Sewell also points out and discusses some of the questions Cogo's article raises. He disagrees with the definition of ELF being based on a distinction between non-native and native language use. He claims that Cogo's approach is too essentialist, because her definition of ELF is based on language features. The approach to ELF should be more non-essentialist according to Sewell who points out that ELF does not involve a set of features or skills that distinguishes it from languages in general, as all language usage is varied. Sewell then considers the implications of the ELF debate for ELT professionals and learners of English, and he highlights the importance of acknowledging language variation when teaching and learning English. Furthermore, he emphasises the importance of presenting this variation to learners, at the appropriate level, and he wishes that this dynamic relationship between ELF and ENL (English as a native language) will be central to how we view language usage.

Dewey criticises Sewell's critical position on the debate, showing how it lacks substance and largely misrepresents the field. Dewey argues that even though Sewell's article is meant to be a critique of ELF, several of his ‘non-essentialist’ views on language are compatible with those of Cogo and other ELF researchers, thus undermining his argument. However, Sewell's paper, according to Dewey, does raise awareness of the need to rethink the terms used when talking about ELF. Dewey defends ELF by emphasising the importance of variability and the dynamic nature of ELF. The distinctiveness of ELF comes from the rapid pace of language evolution and innovation, enhanced in the ELF context due to the linguistic and cultural diversity of English speakers, where understanding is more important than using Standard features.

== Criticism ==
Criticism of ELF generally falls into three camps: Those who argue that the language studied consists of learner errors rather than authentic variation; those who argue that ELF scholars are perpetuating the idea that ELF is a reified variety of English; and those who feel it is upholding notions of neutrality in the face of global domination through languages and discourse.

Regarding the first stance, some linguists claim that variation in ELF is completely haphazard and devoid of any patterns, and therefore not worth studying. Most importantly, proponents of this view reject the idea that emerging insights into how English is used as a lingua franca can provide useful input with regard to the aims and methods of English language teaching.

Regarding the criticism of ELF and variety building, some claim that ELF research has inherited the legacies of traditional linguistics, which contain some obstacles when considering language use in context. For example, there are claims that variationist discourses have entered into some ELF accounts, creating too much emphasis on accounting for language forms and authenticating them numerically, rather than considering all the contextual factors and variations that constitute communicative practices across ELF settings. This leads to linear connections between intention, behaviour, culture, etc., and English usages, which can be false lines of correlation. It also creates a focus on what is different rather than what is there, which moves from a descriptive agenda to a pragmatic (and, arguably, problematic) one. Such criticisms tend to be cooperative and complementary to the ELF field of enquiry, and not as overtly confrontational as those who either take the previous or following stance.

The other line of criticism argues that concepts such as ELF provide a useful (terminological) veneer for continued (linguistic) domination by English-speaking countries through their political, educational, and cultural institutions. This concept of linguistic imperialism has been developed and heavily used by Robert Phillipson. Although Phillipson suggests this idea, there are some controversial facts which put Phillipson in a contrast situation.

Another example is the case of Juliane House, a German scholar who explains in her article "English as a lingua franca: A threat to multilingualism?" her relation to English after World War II. Contrastingly, Davies criticises the concept and argues that it is “inhabited” by two cultures: one is a culture of guilt ("colonies should never have happened") the other is that of romantic despair ("we shouldn’t be doing what we are doing").

Marlén Muñiz García, a scholar who clarifies in her article "Could Esperanto Be the Lifeline that Linguistic Diversity Needs?" how English poses a real risk to linguistic diversity and how the implementation of Esperanto could be more than a utopia.

== Related terminology ==
Other terms with slightly different meanings have been used in the debate and research on the global spread of English, including "English as an International Language" (EIL), "Global English", "Global Englishes", "International English", "World English" and "World Englishes", and "Globish" (Global English). "Global Englishes" (GEs) is generally seen to align closely with ELF, seeing that language use is variable and is very much intermingled with cultural flows, situated contextualisation, and complex interactional alignment between people; whereas the other terms mentioned above tend to be seen as more linguistic in nature (e.g., "'Globish", proposing forms of simplified English needed for communication, vs. ELF and GEs, describing what people actually do when communicating [simple or not]; and "World Englishes", generally accounting for language features and commonalities by region/group, vs. ELF, looking at situated communicative use of English).

One of the key aspects of terminology used in the ELF field of enquiry is that a standardized version of any English variety is not implied, with the dynamic, situated and complex nature of language brought to the fore.

== See also ==
- Englishisation
- Euro English
- International English
- Lingua Franca Core
- World Englishes

== References and further reading ==
- Adolphs, Svenja. 2005. “’I don’t think I should learn all this.’ – A Longitudinal View of Attitudes Towards ‘Native Speaker’ English.” In: Gnutzmann, Claus; Intemann, Frauke. (eds.) The Globalisation of English and the English language classroom. Tübingen: Gunter Narr Verlag, 118-131.
- Björkman, Beyza. 2008. “'So where we are?' Spoken lingua franca English at a technical university in Sweden.” English Today 94 (2), 35-41.
- Bosso, Rino. 2018. “First steps in exploring computer-mediated English as a lingua franca”. In Martin-Rubió, Xavier (ed.). Contextualising English as a lingua franca: from data to insights. Newcastle upon Tyne: Cambridge Scholars, 10-35.
- Breiteneder, Angelika Maria. 2005. “Exploiting redundancy in English as a European Lingua Franca: The case of the ‘third person –s’.” Unpublished MA Thesis, University of Vienna. http://www.univie.ac.at/voice/page/abstracts/breiteneder_2005.pdf
- Breiteneder, Angelika. 2009. English as a lingua franca in Europe. A natural development. Saarbrücken: VDM Verlag Müller. [Print version of Breiteneder 2005.]
- Cogo, Alessia and Dewey, Martin. 2006. “Efficiency in ELF communication. From pragmatic motives to lexico-grammatical innovation.” Nordic Journal of English Studies. http://gupea.ub.gu.se/handle/2077/3148
- Cogo, Allessia. 2008. “English as a Lingua Franca. Form follows function.” English Today 95 (3), 58–61.
- Davies, Alan. 1996. “Review Article: Ironising the myth of Linguicism.” Journal of Multilingual and Multicultural Development. 17:6, 485–596.
- Ferguson, Gibbson. 2006. “Issues in researching English as a lingua franca: a conceptual enquiry.” International Journal of Applied Linguistics 19: 2, 117–135.
- Firth, Alan. 1996. “The discursive accomplishment of normality. On 'lingua franca' English and conversation analysis.” Journal of Pragmatics 26, 237–59, qtd. in Lesznyák 2002.
- Firth, Alan. 2009. “The lingua franca factor.” Intercultural pragmatics 6: 2, 147–170.
- Galloway, Nicola & Rose, Heath. 2015. Introducing Global Englishes. Arbingdon, UK: Routledge.
- Gnutzmann, Claus; Intemann, Frauke (eds.). 2005. The Globalisation of English and the English language classroom. Tübingen: Gunter Narr Verlag.
- Grau, Maike. 2005. “English as a global language – What do future teachers have to say?” In *Gnutzmann, Claus; Intemann, Frauke (eds.). The Globalisation of English and the English Language Classroom. Tübingen: Gunter Narr, 261–274.
- House, Juliane. 2002. “Developing pragmatic competence in English as a Lingua Franca.” In Knapp, Karlfried; Meierkord, Christiane (eds.). Lingua franca communication. Frankfurt am Main: Peter, 245–267.
- House, Juliane. 2003. “English as a lingua franca: A threat to multilingualism?” Journal of Sociolinguistics 7: 4, 556–578.
- Hülmbauer, Cornelia. 2007. “'You moved, aren't?' The relationship between lexicogrammatical correctness and communicative effectiveness in English as a lingua franca.” Views 16: 2, 3-36. http://www.univie.ac.at/Anglistik/Views_0702.pdf.
- Hülmbauer, Cornelia et al. 2008 “Introducing English as a lingua franca (ELF): Precursor and partner in intercultural communication.” Synergies Europe 3, 25–36. https://web.archive.org/web/20110721023252/http://ressources-cla.univ-fcomte.fr/gerflint/Europe3/hulmbauer.pdf.
- Jenkins, Jennifer; Seidlhofer, Barbara. 2001. “Bringing Europe's lingua franca into the classroom.” The Guardian Weekly 19 April 2001. https://www.theguardian.com/education/2001/apr/19/languages.highereducation1.
- Jenkins, Jennifer. 2007. English as a Lingua Franca: Attitudes and Identity. Oxford: Oxford University Press.
- Kalocsai, Karolina. 2009. “Erasmus exchange students. A behind-the-scenes view into an ELF community of practice”. Apples – Journal of Applied Linguistics Series 3 (1), 25–49. http://apples.jyu.fi (6 July 2010).
- Klimpfinger, Theresa. 2005. “The role of speakers' first and other languages in English as a lingua franca talk.” Unpublished MA Thesis, University of Vienna. http://www.univie.ac.at/voice/page/abstracts/klimpfinger_2005.pdf.
- Klimpfinger, Theresa. 2007. “'Mind you, sometimes you have to mix'. The role of code-switching in English as a lingua franca.” Views 16: 2, 36–61. https://web.archive.org/web/20110706090020/http://anglistik.univie.ac.at/fileadmin/user_upload/dep_anglist/weitere_Uploads/Views/Views_0702.pdf.
- Knapp, Karlfried; Meierkord, Christiane (eds.). 2002. Lingua franca communication. Frankfurt am Main: Peter Lang.
- Lesznyák, Ágnes. 2002. “From chaos to the smallest common denominator. Topic management in English lingua franca communication.” In Knapp, Karlfried; Meierkord, Christiane (eds.). Lingua franca communication. Frankfurt am Main et al.: Peter Lang, 163–194. https://books.google.com/books?id=KDi30N8c2kgC&pg=PA263
- MacKenzie, Ian. 2013. English as a Lingua Franca: Theorizing and Teaching English. London: Routledge.
- MacKenzie, Ian. 2018. Language Contact and the Future of English. London: Routledge.
- Mauranen, Anna; Ranta, Elina (eds.). 2009. English as a lingua franca. Studies and findings. Newcastle upon Tine: Cambridge Scholars.
- Mollin, Sandra. 2006. Euro English. Assessing Variety Status. Tübingen: Gunter Narr. https://books.google.com/books?id=qPhULmMmqJMC
- Meierkord, Christiane. 2002. “’Language stripped bare’ or ‘linguistic masala’? Culture in lingua franca conversation.” In: Knapp, Karlfried; Meierkord, Christiane (eds.). Lingua franca communication. Frankfurt: Peter Lang, 109-133.
- Phillipson, Robert. 2001. “English for globalization or for the world’s people?”. International Review of Education 47: 3, 185–200.
- Phillipson, Robert. 2008. “Lingua franca or lingua frankensteinia? English in European integration and globalization.” World Englishes 27: 2, 250–267.
- Pitzl, Marie-Luise. 2009. “'We should not wake up any dogs': Idiom and metaphor in ELF.”. In Mauranen, Anna and Ranta, Elina (eds.). English as a Lingua Franca: Studies and findings. Newcastle upon Tyne: Cambridge Scholars Press, 298–322.
- Pölzl, Ulrike. 2005. “Exploring the third space. Negotiating culture in English as a lingua franca.” Unpublished PhD thesis, University of Vienna.
- Pölzl, Ulrike; Seidlhofer, Barbara. 2006. “In and on their own terms. The ‘habitat factor’ in English as a lingua franca interactions.” International Journal of the Sociology of Language 177, 151-17.
- Vienna Oxford International Corpus of English (VOICE) http://www.univie.ac.at/voice/
- Seidlhofer, Barbara. 2001. “Closing a conceptual gap: the case for a description of English as a lingua franca.” International Journal of Applied Linguistics 11: 2, 133–158.
- Seidlhofer, Barbara. 2003. “A concept of international English and related issues: From ‘Real English’ to ‘Realistic English’?” In: Council of Europe. Language Policy Division. Strasbourg: Council of Europe. http://www.coe.int/t/dg4/linguistic/source/seidlhoferen.pdf.
- Seidlhofer, Barbara. 2004. “Research Perspectives on teaching English as a Lingua Franca.” Annual Review of Applied Linguistics 24, 209–239.
- Seidlhofer, Barbara. 2005. “English as a lingua franca.” ELF Journal 59: 4, 339–340.
- Seidlhofer, Barbara. 2006. “Towards making ‘Euro-English’ a linguistic reality.” In: Bolton, Kinglsey; Kachru, Braj B. (eds.). World Englishes. Critical Concepts in Linguistics. Volume III. London: Routledge, 47-50.
- Seidlhofer, Barbara. 2011. Understanding English as a Lingua Franca. Oxford: Oxford University Press.
- Seidlhofer, Barbara; Widdowson, Henry G. 2003. “House work and student work. A study in cross-cultural understanding. Übersetzen, Interkulturelle Kommunikation, Spracherwerb und Sprachvermittlung—das Leben mit mehreren Sprachen“. Festschrift für Juliane House zum 60. Geburtstag. Zeitschrift für interkulturellen Fremdsprachenunterricht. 8: 115–127. https://web.archive.org/web/20110719100302/http://zif.spz.tu-darmstadt.de/jg-08-2-3/docs/Seidlhofer_Widdowson.pdf.
- Spichtinger, Daniel. 2000. The Spread of English and its Appropriation. Unpublished MA Thesis, University of Vienna. http://spichtinger.net/Uni/sp-dipl3.pdf.
- Timmis, Ivor. 2002. “Native speaker norms and international English: a classroom view.” ELT Journal 56, 240–249. https://web.archive.org/web/20110722230455/http://biblioteca.uqroo.mx/hemeroteca/elt_journal/2002/julio/560240.pdf.
- Zeiss, Nadine. 2010. English as a European lingua franca. Changing attitudes in an inter-connected world. Berlin: VDM Verlag Dr. Müller.
