= Jennifer Jenkins =

British linguist

Jennifer Jenkins, FAcSS is a British linguist and academic. She was Chair Professor of Global Englishes at the University of Southampton until her retirement in 2019. She is a leading figure in the study of English as a Lingua Franca (ELF), and is an expert on communication in English between non-native speakers. This is a relatively new field of study and her opinions are sometimes seen as controversial. Her interests include attitudes to the international range of "Englishes", English as a lingua franca in higher education, and the implications of ELF for ways of teaching English as a foreign language. She has published and lectured widely and is a founder editor of the Journal of English as a Lingua Franca.

== Education and early career ==
Jenkins studied English language, literature, linguistics, Old English and Icelandic at the universities of Leicester and Oxford and spent a few years as a teacher of English as a foreign language before starting to train other teachers.

== Career ==
In 1992 she began teaching at King's College London and in 1995 completed her PhD at the Institute of Education, University College, London with a thesis on Variation in Phonological Error in Interlanguage Talk, discussing a continuing research interest of hers: "English pronunciation within an international framework". She remained at King's College until 2007 where she designed and directed the MA in English Language Teaching and Applied Linguistics. While there, she introduced a fast-track MA for TESOL students.

When Jenkins' book Phonology Of English As An International Language was published in 2000 it was seen as potentially controversial and stimulated debate about the prevailing emphasis on "correct" accents in teaching English as a foreign language, and Jenkins' idea of the Lingua Franca Core. This is a core list of pronunciation features which ELF speakers need to master in order to be mutually intelligible. Jenkins' idea that English is "an international language and as such no longer the preserve of its native speakers" has been seen as a challenge to teachers of English.

In 2007 Jenkins was appointed to the Chair of Global Englishes at Southampton University and in May 2012 launched the Centre for Global Englishes there, of which she is the director. In her lecture inaugurating the Centre she said that UK universities describe themselves as international, and yet they expect overseas students to conform to UK norms of pronunciation, idiom etc. Earlier the same year, Jenkins co-founded the Journal of English as a Lingua Franca which aims to respond to the "unprecedented use of English as an international lingua franca, as both consequence and driving force of globalization". She has several other editorial roles.

== Honours ==
In September 2014, Jenkins was elected a Fellow of the Academy of Social Sciences.

== Select bibliography ==
- The phonology of English as an international language: new models, new norms, new goals, OUP 2000
- English as a Lingua Franca: attitude and identity, OUP 2007
- Global Englishes: a resource book for students, 3rd ed. Routledge 2015 [previous editions under the main title World Englishes]
- Global Englishes in Asian Contexts: Current and Future Debates - Murata, Kumiko and Jenkins, Jennifer (eds.), Basingstoke 2009
- Latest trends in ELF research - Archibald, Alasdair, Cogo, Alessia and Jenkins, Jennifer (eds.), Newcastle 2011
- English as a Lingua Franca in the international university: the politics of academic English language policy, Abingdon 2013
