= Lingua Franca Core =

English pronunciation features recommended for teaching

The Lingua Franca Core (LFC) is a selection of pronunciation features of the English language recommended as a basis in teaching of English as a lingua franca. It was proposed by linguist Jennifer Jenkins in her 2000 book The Phonology of English as an International Language. Jenkins derived the LFC from features found to be crucial in non-native speakers' understanding of each other, and advocated that teachers focus on those features and regard deviations from other native features not as errors but as acceptable variations. The proposal sparked a debate among linguists and pedagogists, while Jenkins contended that much of the criticism was based on misinterpretations of her proposal.

== Features ==
Jenkins summarised the Lingua Franca Core as follows:

- /θ, ð/ may be substituted by other consonants.
- Syllable-final /r/ is always produced (rhotic).
- Intervocalic /t, nt/ are always pronounced [t, nt] rather than [ɾ, ɾ̃] (lack of flapping).
- Allophonic variation within a consonant is allowed insofar as it does not interfere with another phoneme (as in [β] for /v/, which may be mistaken for /b/).
- Word-initial /p, t, k/ are aspirated.
- Pre-fortis clipping is present, so that the vowel in kit is shorter than that in kid.
- Omission of consonants in clusters is allowed word-medially and -‍finally (but not -‍initially).
- Vowel epenthesis between consonants is allowed.
- The contrast between checked and free vowels is maintained quantitatively, not necessarily qualitatively, so that the vowel in heat is longer than that in hit but need not differ in quality.
- Non-native vowel qualities are acceptable as long as they are consistent, except for the NURSE vowel.
- Contrastive stress is present.

Jenkins also identified non-core features, which did not hinder intelligibility among non-native speakers and were therefore deemed non-essential in teaching:

- [θ], [ð], and [ɫ] (allophone of /l/)
- Finer vowel quality
- Weak forms of function words (which can rather have an adverse effect on intelligibility)
- Some features of connected speech, such as the place assimilation of a word-final plosive
- Pitch movement signalling attitude or grammatical meaning
- Lexical stress
- Stress-timed rhythm

Jenkins stressed that the LFC should be taught in parallel with "accommodation skills" to facilitate communication with speakers with different language backgrounds.

The features were based on 40 tokens of misunderstanding between speakers from Japan and Switzerland, and were intended as subject to further empirical testing and fine-tuning. The legitimacy of inclusion or exclusion of certain features has been challenged, such as /θ, ð/, rhoticity, the NURSE vowel, lexical stress, and pitch movement. Taking into account these perceived shortcomings of the LFC, recommendations similar to the LFC but intended for learners from specific linguistic or geographical backgrounds have been produced.

== Application ==
Walker (2010) is considered the first textbook for language teachers to incorporate the Lingua Franca Core.

== Bibliography ==
- Deterding, David (2011). Misunderstandings in English as a Lingua Franca: An Analysis of ELF Interactions in South-East Asia. Boston: De Gruyter Mouton. doi:10.1515/9783110288599. ISBN 978-3-11-028651-9.
- Jenkins, Jennifer (2000). The Phonology of English as an International Language: New Models, New Norms, New Goals. Oxford University Press. ISBN 0-19-442164-3.
- Jenkins, Jennifer (2002). "A Sociolinguistically Based, Empirically Researched Pronunciation Syllabus for English as an International Language". Applied Linguistics. 23 (1): 83–103. doi:10.1093/applin/23.1.83.
- Jenkins, Jennifer (2008). "Misinterpretation, Bias and Resistance to Change: The Case of the Lingua Franca Core". In Dziubalska-Kołaczyk, Katarzyna; Przedlacka, Joanna (eds.). English Pronunciation Models: A Changing Scene (2nd ed.). Bern: Peter Lang. pp. 199–210. ISBN 978-3-03-911682-9.
- Jenkins, Jennifer; Cogo, Alessia; Dewey, Martin (2011). "Review of developments in research into English as a lingua franca" (PDF). Language Teaching. 44 (3): 281–315. doi:10.1017/S0261444811000115. S2CID 7361419.
- Kirkpatrick, Andy (2010). English as a Lingua Franca in ASEAN: A Multilingual Model. Hong Kong University Press. ISBN 978-988-8028-79-5. JSTOR j.ctt1xcs49.
- McCrocklin, Shannon (2012). "The role of word stress in English as a lingua franca" (PDF). In Levis, John; LeVelle, Kimberly (eds.). Proceedings of the 3rd Annual Pronunciation in Second Language Learning and Teaching Conference. Ames, Iowa: Iowa State University. pp. 249–256.
- Osimk, Ruth (2009). "Decoding sounds: an experimental approach to intelligibility in ELF" (PDF). Vienna English Working Papers. 18 (1): 64–89. ISSN 2074-9864.
- Pickering, Lucy (2009). "Intonation as a pragmatic resource in ELF interaction". Intercultural Pragmatics. 6 (2): 235–255. doi:10.1515/IPRG.2009.013. S2CID 55627660.
- Walker, Robin (2010). Teaching the Pronunciation of English as a Lingua Franca: A User-friendly Handbook Which Explores the Benefits of an English as a Lingua Franca Approach to Pronunciation. Oxford University Press. ISBN 978-0-19-442200-0.
- Walker, Robin; Zoghbor, Wafa (2015). "The Pronunciation of English as a Lingua Franca". In Reed, Marine; Levis, John M. (eds.). The Handbook of English Pronunciation. Oxford: Wiley-Blackwell. pp. 433–453. ISBN 978-1-118-31447-0.
- Zoghbor, Wafa Shahada (2018). "Teaching English pronunciation to multi-dialect first language learners: The revival of the Lingua Franca Core (LFC)". System. 78: 1–14. doi:10.1016/j.system.2018.06.008. S2CID 69273729.
