= List of schools in Kowloon City District =

This is a list of schools in Kowloon City District, Hong Kong.

== Secondary schools ==
Below is a list of secondary schools in Kowloon City District.

Government

- Arts & Technology Education Centre (藝術與科技教育中心)
- Homantin Government Secondary School (何文田官立中學)
- Jockey Club Government Secondary School (賽馬會官立中學)

Aided

- Bishop Hall Jubilee School (何明華會督銀禧中學)
- Carmel Secondary School (迦密中學)
- CCC Kei To Secondary School (中華基督教會基道中學)
- Chan Sui Ki (La Salle) College (陳瑞祺（喇沙）書院)
- Cognitio College (Kowloon) (文理書院（九龍）)
- Hoi Ping Chamber of Commerce Secondary School (旅港開平商會中學)
- Holy Family Canossian College (嘉諾撒聖家書院)
- Kowloon Tong School (Secondary Section) (九龍塘學校（中學部）)
- Kowloon True Light School (九龍真光中學)
- La Salle College (喇沙書院)
- Maryknoll Convent School (Secondary Section) (瑪利諾修院學校（中學部）)
- Munsang College (民生書院)
- New Asia Middle School (新亞中學)
- Notre Dame College (獻主會聖母院書院)
- Pentecostal School (五旬節中學)
- Pooi To Middle School (香港培道中學)
- Pui Ching Middle School (香港培正中學)
- Rhenish Church Pang Kok-ko Memorial College (禮賢會彭學高紀念中學)
- SKH Holy Carpenter Secondary School (聖公會聖匠中學)
- SKH Holy Trinity Church Secondary School (聖公會聖三一堂中學)
- SKH Tsoi Kung Po Secondary School (聖公會蔡功譜中學)
- St. Teresa Secondary School (德蘭中學)
- STFA Seaward Woo College (順德聯誼總會胡兆熾中學)
- Tang King Po School (鄧鏡波學校)
- TWGH Wong Fut Nam College (東華三院黃笏南中學)
- Wa Ying College (華英中學)
- Yu Chun Keung Memorial College (余振強紀念中學)
- YWCA Hioe Tjo Yoeng College (基督教女青年會丘佐榮中學)

Direct Subsidy Scheme

- Diocesan Boys' School (拔萃男書院)
- Heep Yunn School (協恩中學)
- HKICC Lee Shau Kee School of Creativity (香港兆基創意書院)
- Po Leung Kuk Ngan Po Ling College (保良局顏寶鈴書院)
- Scientia Secondary School (創知中學)

English Schools Foundation

- King George V School

Private

- American International School
- Anantara College (泰來書院)
- Australian International School Hong Kong
- Rudolf Steiner Education Foundation Hong Kong Maria College (香港華德福教育基金會瑪利亞書院)
- Stamford American School Hong Kong
- Yew Chung International School (Secondary)

== Primary schools ==
Below is a list of primary schools in Kowloon City District.

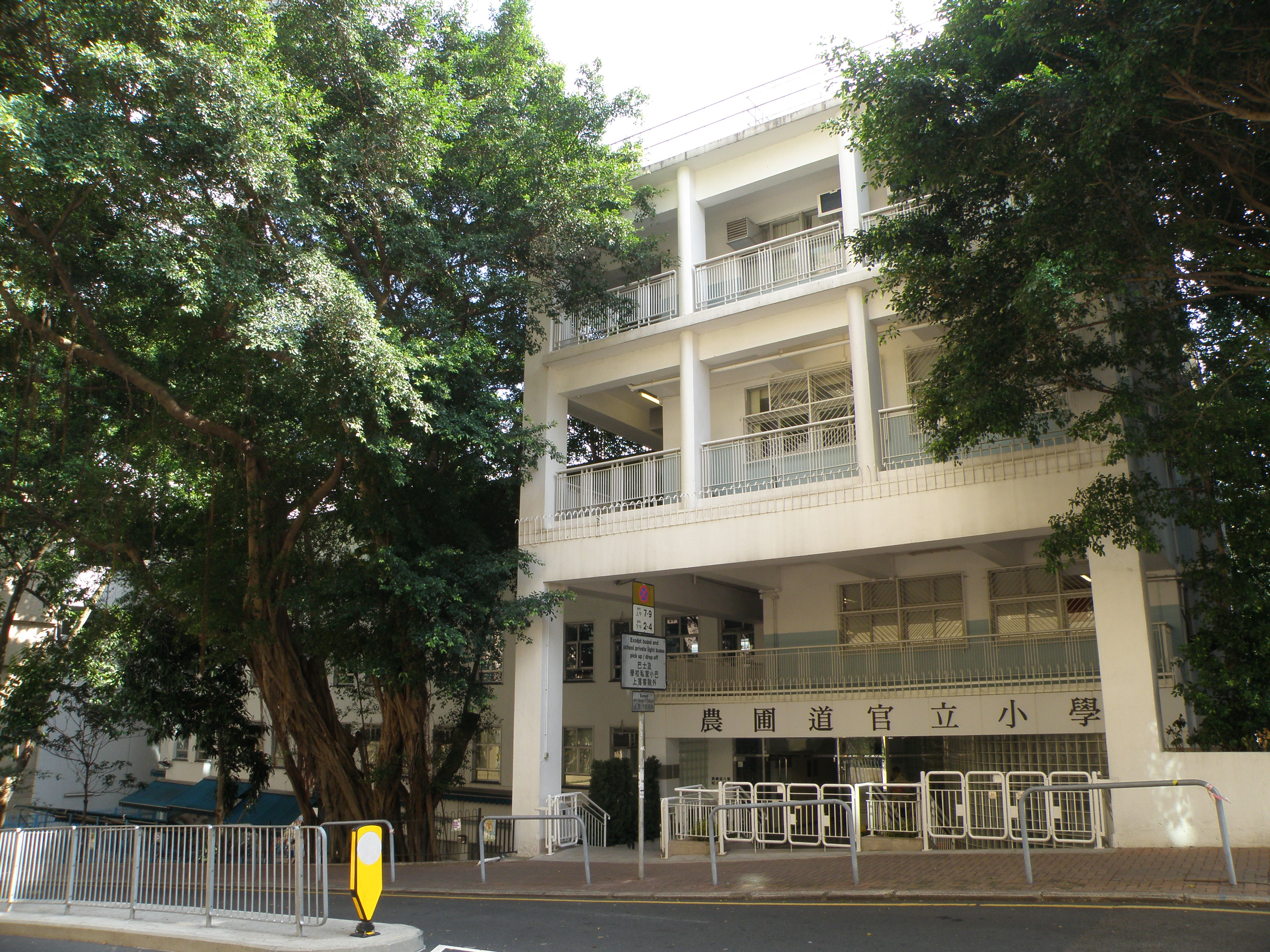
Farm Road Government Primary School

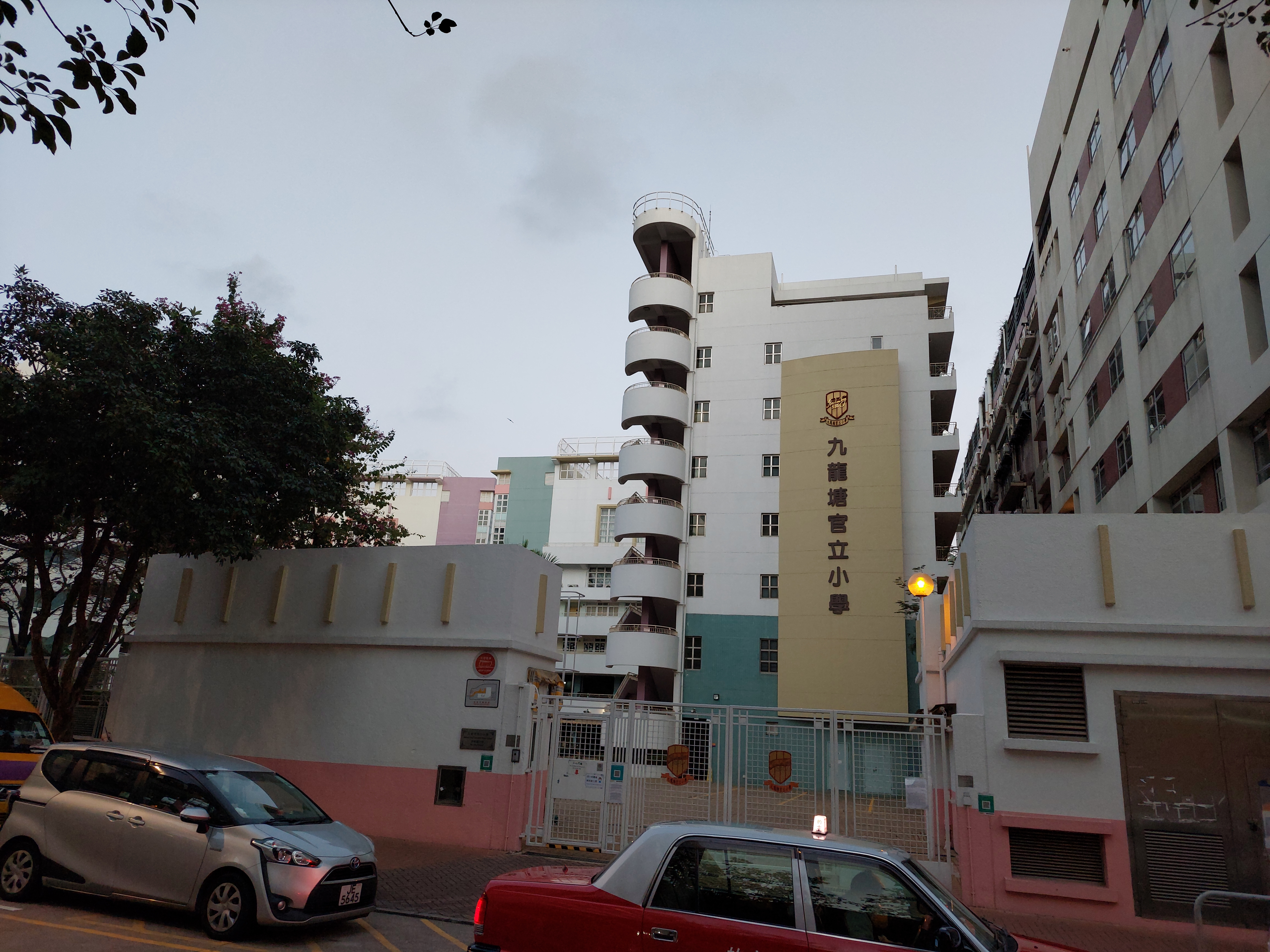
Kowloon Tong Government Primary School

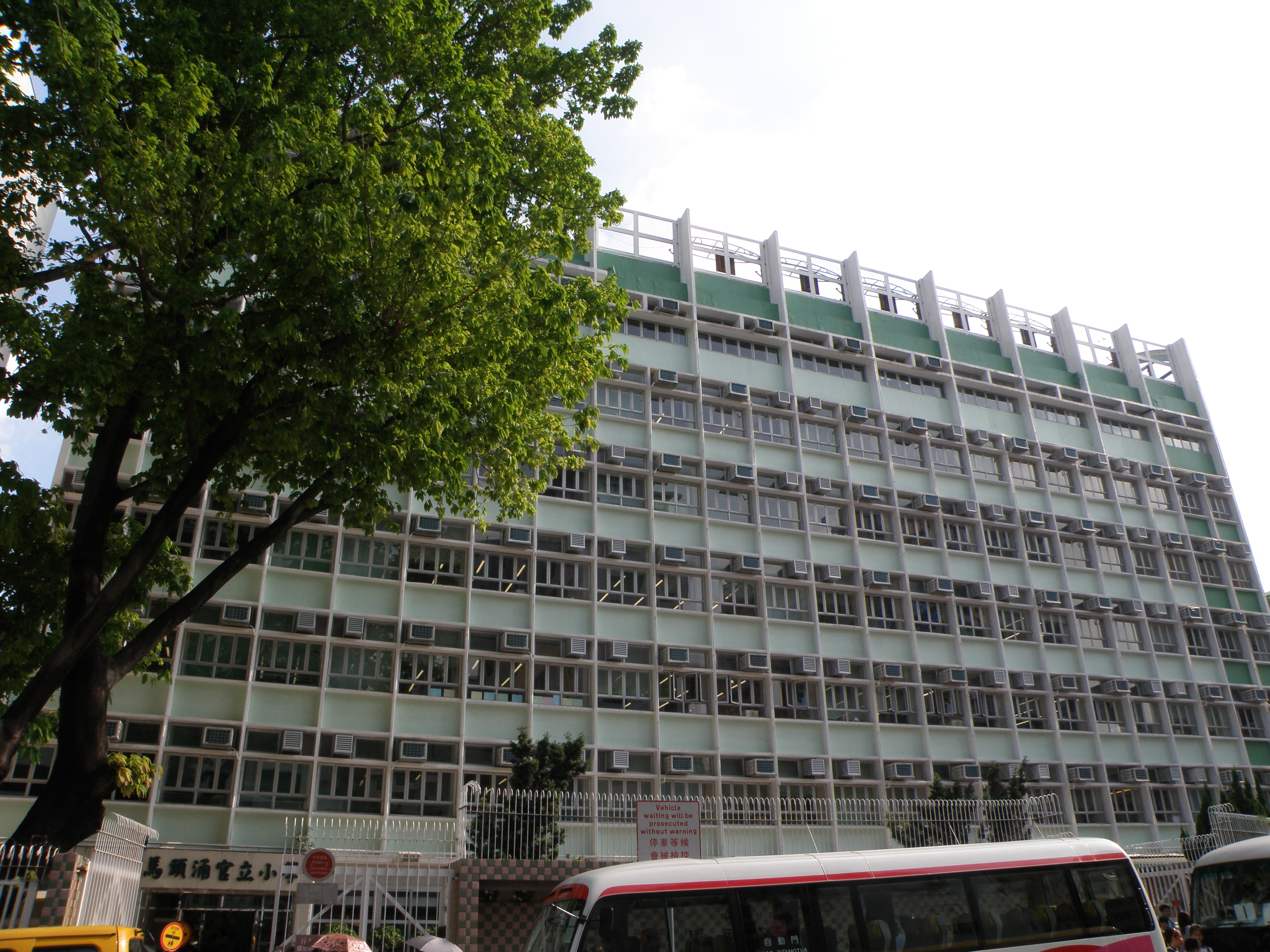
Ma Tau Chung Government Primary School

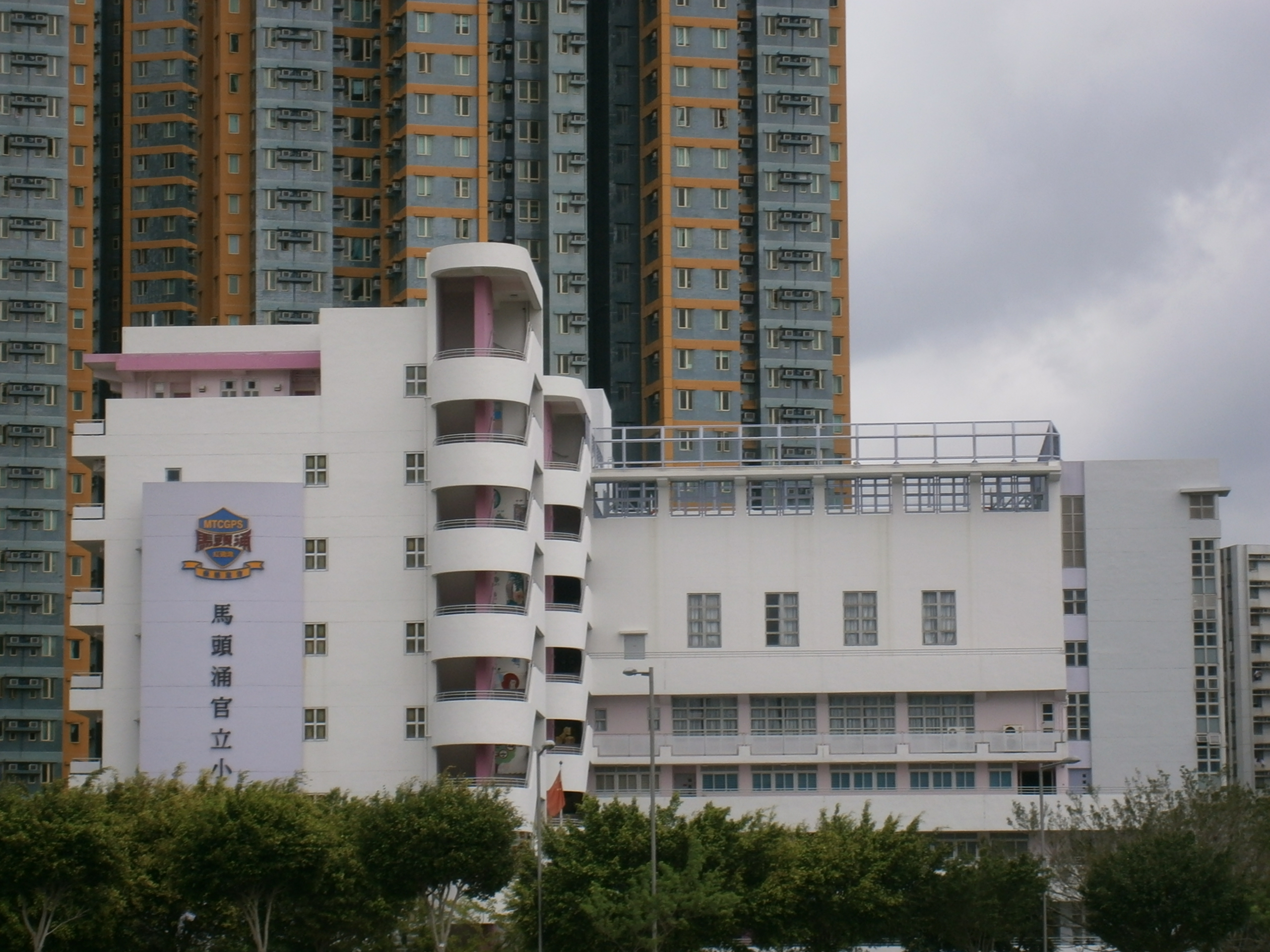
Ma Tau Chung Government Primary School (Hung Hom Bay)

Government

- Farm Road Government Primary School (農圃道官立小學)
- Kowloon Tong Government Primary School (九龍塘官立小學)
- Ma Tau Chung Government Primary School (馬頭涌官立小學)
- Ma Tau Chung Government Primary School (Hung Hom Bay) (馬頭涌官立小學（紅磡灣）)

Aided

- Alliance Primary School, Whampoa (黃埔宣道小學)
- CCC Kei Wa Primary School (Kowloon Tong) (中華基督教會基華小學（九龍塘）)
- CCC Wanchai Church Kei To Primary School (Kowloon City) (中華基督教會灣仔堂基道小學（九龍城）)
- Chan Sui Ki (La Salle) Primary School (陳瑞祺（喇沙）小學)
- Diocesan Preparatory School (拔萃小學)
- ELCHK Hung Hom Lutheran Primary School (基督教香港信義會紅磡信義學校)
- Emmanuel Primary School, Kowloon (九龍靈光小學)
- GCEPSA Whampoa Primary School (葛量洪校友會黃埔學校)
- Heep Yunn Primary School (協恩中學附屬小學)
- Holy Angels Canossian School (天神嘉諾撒學校)
- Holy Family Canossian School (Kowloon Tong) (嘉諾撒聖家學校（九龍塘）)
- Holy Family Canossian School (嘉諾撒聖家學校)
- Hop Yat Church School (合一堂學校)
- Iu Shan School (耀山學校)
- Kowloon Tong Bishop Walsh Catholic School (九龍塘天主教華德學校)
- Kowloon Tong School (Primary Section) (九龍塘學校（小學部））
- La Salle Primary School (喇沙小學)
- Ling To Catholic Primary School (天主教領島學校)
- Maryknoll Convent School (Primary Section) (瑪利諾修院學校（小學部）)
- Oblate Primary School (獻主會小學)
- PLK Stanley Ho Sau Nan Primary School (保良局何壽南小學)
- S.K.H. Holy Carpenter Primary School (聖公會聖匠小學)
- SKH Fung Kei Millennium Primary School (聖公會奉基千禧小學)
- SKH Fung Kei Primary School (聖公會奉基小學)
- SKH Good Shepherd Primary School (聖公會牧愛小學)
- SKH Holy Cross Primary School (聖公會聖十架小學)
- SKH St Timothy's Primary School (聖公會聖提摩太小學)
- St Eugene de Mazenod Oblate Primary School (獻主會聖馬善樂小學)
- St Rose of Lima's School (聖羅撒學校)

Direct Subsidy Scheme

- Diocesan Boys' School (拔萃男書院)
- PLK Lam Man Chan English Primary School (保良局林文燦英文小學)

English Schools Foundation

- Beacon Hill School
- Kowloon Junior School

Private

- Alliance Primary School Hong Kong (九龍塘宣道小學)
- American International School (Primary Branch)
- Aoi Pui School (愛培學校)
- Australian International School Hong Kong
- Christian Alliance PC Lau Memorial International School (宣道會劉平齋紀念國際學校_
- Creative Primary School (啓思小學)
- First Assembly of God Primary School and Kindergarten (神召第一小學暨幼稚園)
- Holy Trinity Primary School (聖三一堂小學)
- Kingston International School (京斯敦國際學校)
- KLT Funful English Primary School (九龍塘方方樂趣英文小學)
- Kowloon Tong School (九龍塘學校
- Kowloon True Light School (Primary Section (九龍真光中學（小學部）)
- Munsang College Primary School (民生書院小學)
- Oxbridge British School (劍津英國學校)
- Po Leung Kuk Madam Chan Wai Chow Memorial School (保良局陳維周夫人紀念學校) - To Kwa Wan
  - It was formerly the Portuguese Community School (賈梅士學校).
- Pooi To Primary School (香港培道小學)
- Pui Ching Primary School (香港培正小學)
- St Johannes College (聖若望英文書院)
- Stamford American School Hong Kong
- Think International School (朗思國際學校)
- Yew Chung International School

== Special schools ==
Below is a list of special schools in Kowloon City District.

Aided

- Chi Yun School (慈恩學校)
- Hong Kong Red Cross Hospital Schools Kowloon Hospital (香港紅十字會醫院學校)
- Hong Kong Red Cross Hospital Schools Hong Kong Children's Hospital (香港紅十字會醫院學校)
- Mary Rose School (天保民學校)
- PLK Anita LL Chan (Centenary) School (保良局陳麗玲（百周年）學校)

English Schools Foundation

- Jockey Club Sarah Roe School (賽馬會善樂學校)

== Former schools ==
Government

- Hung Hom Government Primary School - Later used as the Kowloon Junior School Hung Hom Campus, and the French School Hung Hom Campus

Private

- French International School of Hong Kong Hung Hom Campus
