= Maria College, Hong Kong =

School in Hong Kong

Coordinates: 22.333366°N 114.162699°E

Rudolf Steiner Education Foundation Hong Kong Maria College
- Traditional Chinese: 香港華德福教育基金會瑪利亞書院
- Simplified Chinese: 香港华德福教育基金会玛利亚书院
Transcriptions
Standard Mandarin
- Hanyu Pinyin: Xiānggǎng Huádéfú Jiàoyù Jījīnhuì Mǎlìyà Shūyuàn

Maria College (Chinese: 瑪利亞書院), Registration No.215287, was established in 1976. The College is headquartered in the Prince Edward campus in the Lee May Building in Mong Kok, Hong Kong.

== History ==
Established in 1976, Maria College (Registration No. 215287) is a Hong Kong-based private secondary school specialized in university bachelor's degree and secondary school programs. It has been registered with the Education Bureau since 1977.

== Locations ==
- Prince Edward, Kowloon
- Kowloon Tong (at Jockey Club Government Secondary School)
- Mong Kok (at Queen Elizabeth School)
- Causeway Bay (at Hotung Secondary School)
- Yuen Long (at Yuen Long District Secondary School)
- Fanling (at Fanling Government Secondary School)
- Tseung Kwan O (at Tseung Kwan O Government Secondary School)

Its head office was previously in Sham Shui Po. It previously had locations in North Point and Tai Po.

== School Features ==
Maria College is a private school which provides HKDSE and GCE program.
It also co-operates with Guangzhou Jinan University and provides three bachelor's degrees, which are:

- BA of Business Administration (Registration No. 232240)
- BA of Sociology (Registration No. 232237)
- BA of Tourism management-Hotel Management orientation (Registration No. 232454)
