= Hoi Ping Chamber of Commerce Secondary School =

Secondary school in Kowloon, Hong Kong

Coordinates: 22.31927°N 114.18075°E

Location
- 22 Shek Ku Street, Ho Man Tin, Kowloon, Hong Kong

Information
- School type: Co-educational, government-aided
- Motto: "Morality, Wisdom, Health and Diligence" (德智健勤)
- Founded: 1973; 53 years ago
- Principal: Wan Mei Yuk, Anneliese
- Teaching staff: 58 in 2009
- Enrollment: 1122 in 2009
- Language: English
- Website: http://www.hpccss.edu.hk/

Hoi Ping Chamber of Commerce Secondary School (Chinese: 旅港開平商會中學, abbr. HPCCSS) is a co-educational EMI secondary school located in Ho Man Tin, Kowloon Hong Kong. Hoi Ping is also well known for its school athletic team which ranked third in the Hong Kong Inter-School Athletics Competition.

== Vision ==
Hoi Ping Chamber of Commerce Secondary School's school motto is Morality (德, "Tak"), Wisdom (智, "Chi"), Health (健, "Kin") and Diligence (勤, "Kan"). The missions of the school are said to be as follows:

1. To nourish students through morality education.
2. To promulgate knowledge which is essential in society.
3. To formulate the ability of independent thinking among students.
4. To engender the ability of self-studying among students.
5. To advocate diligence.
6. To facilitate the development of mental and physical health alike.

== History ==
=== Founding ===
Hoi Ping Chamber of Commerce Secondary School was founded in 1973 as a co-educational aided school. The Alumni Association was established in 1981. The Students' Union and the Parent-Teacher Association were set up in 1987 and 1999 respectively. Hoi Ping has long been a Band 1 school in Kowloon City district.

In 1998, its use of English as the Medium of Instruction was approved by the Education Department of the HKSAR.

=== In recent years ===
To facilitate progress, the school set up the School Development Team in 2002. Based on the school's "Strengths, Weaknesses, Opportunities and Threats" analysis and their teachers' opinions, the team has formulated the School Development Plan 2003–2006. The major concerns are:

1. enhancing student personal growth
2. enhancing teaching and learning
3. improving teaching and learning environment.

True to its plan, HPCCSS has sustained rapid growth and improvement in recent years, including: encouraging and employing the use of IT technology, the construction of a New Wing (pictured), which includes classrooms and a new library, and the promotion of a wide variety of new activities, including dancing and drama. It was noted for its excellent athletic achievements, such as in the Boys Inter-school Athletics Championships where it was awarded the fourth position in 2004–2005.

=== Annals ===
Year	Event
1973	The establishment of the school and the first Opening Ceremony. The first school picnic at Wu Kwai Sha Youth Village.
1974	The first summer camp. First participation in the Hong Kong Schools Speech Festival.
1975	The official opening of the school library. The four houses, Tak, Chi, Kin, and Kan, were formulated. The first Athletics Meet was organised at Boundary Street Sports Centre.
1976	Weekly schedules were implemented. The first Swimming Gala was held at Kwun Tong Swimming Pool.
1977	The first Graduation Ceremony was held.
1978	The girl scouts 82nd Brigade (Kowloon) was established.
1981	The first Parents' Day; the first issue of "Hok Lam" (學林) was published.
1987	The first Students' Union was established.
1994	Held the Inter-school Talent Show 1994. English would be utilised as the Medium of Instruction from Secondary 1.
1996	A Secondary 3 male pupil garnered the championship of the 48th Hong Kong Schools Speech Festival, whereas the literature class in Secondary 7 attained the championship in the Chinese poetry anthology section of the "Wen Wei Po Cup" (文匯報盃). The men's team, participating in the Inter-school Track and Field Competition (學界田徑), was promoted from Division 3 to 2. The C Grade women's team, participating in the Inter-school Track and Field Competition, accomplished the championship in Division 2.
1997	The government would advocate the "Mother Tongue Teaching" scheme (母語教學), but the school was permitted to retain lecturing in English.
1999	The Parents-Teacher Association (PTA) was officially founded.
2003	A fair in celebration of the 30th anniversary of the school was arranged. The Central Broadcasting System was installed. Due to SARS, school was suspended in April until the 22nd.
2004	A collaboration with Sing Yin Secondary School, which was the 1st Exchange Program, commenced. The "Smoke-free Lunch" (無煙午膳) campaign started.
2005	The new wing of campus, the Lee Quo Wei Building, was put into use. The 2nd Exchange Problem was arranged, working with Bishop Hall Jubilee School.
2007	The Incorporated Management Committee was established.
2008	The men's team attained third place in Division 1 of the Inter-school Track and Field Competition, being the first co-ed school to accomplish such an achievement (Pui Ching Middle School (Hong Kong) had garnered the championship in 1971).
2009	The 1st Anniversary Concert (週年音樂會) was held.
2011	Four Secondary 7 students opted in to the Joint School Science Exhibition, and trumped their opponents with a "Dual system anti-burglary system" (雙制式防爆竊系統), which conflated mechanical and electronic door locks. The captain, Ng Chi Chung (吳志聰), was interviewed as a result.
2014	A school strike was held arising from the 2014–2015 Hong Kong electoral reform, and it was reported by a multitude of mainstream media.
2020	School was suspended from January to 26 May (for Secondary 3 to 5) due to the COVID-19 pandemic.

== Features and facilities ==
=== Basic facilities ===
The New Wing was completed and handed over to the school in August 2005, with a new library set up, using new equipment. There are thirty classrooms, two supportive education rooms, four laboratories, two computer rooms, a geography room, a music room, a needlework room, a home economics room, an art room, a multi-media learning center, a language room, a library, a student activity center, a STEM room, and a multi-purpose room. All the rooms are air-conditioned and furnished with computer nodes for accessing the Internet.

=== The environment ===
Plants have been allocated throughout the school in an effort "to beautify the learning environment." Activities are organized for students to take care of these plants and take part in 'green'-ifying the school. Announcements are often made to remind students about protecting the school environment.

== Extra-curricular activities ==
There are altogether forty clubs available, despite the lack of activities during the COVID pandemic. Students are encouraged to join extracurricular activities and, in the meantime, work hard to achieve top academic results. The Students' Union also organizes activities for students, ranging from selling affordable stationeries to chess competitions.

== Subjects ==
=== Form 1 to Form 3 ===
- English as Medium of Instruction:
  - English Language
  - Mathematics
  - History
  - Geography
  - Life and Society
  - Economics (Form 3)
  - Integrated Science (Form 1 to Form 2)
  - Chemistry (Form 3)
  - Physics (Form 3)
  - Biology (Form 3)
  - Computer Literacy
  - Visual Arts
  - Music
  - Physical Education
  - Home Economics (Form 1 to Form 2)
- Chinese as Medium of Instruction:
  - Chinese Language
  - Chinese History
  - Putonghua

=== From 4 to From 6 (HKDSE Programme) ===
Core subjects (Compulsory):

- English as Medium of Instruction:
  - English Language
  - Mathematics
  - Liberal Studies
  - Physical Education
- Chinese as Medium of Instruction:
  - Chinese Language

Electives (3 Subjects must be selected):

- English as Medium of Instruction:
  - Mathematics M1/M2
  - History
  - Geography
  - Economics
  - BAFS
  - Physics
  - Chemistry
  - Biology
  - Information and Communication Technology
  - Visual Arts
- Chinese as Medium of Instruction:
  - Chinese History
  - Chinese Literature

== Academic performance ==
The results in the DSE are above average and the university admission rate exceeds 50%.

In 2017, the successful JUPAS admission is 75.2% with the best individual result of four 5** and three 5*.

== Notable alumnae ==
Pierre Lau - Managing Director, Citibank, renowned equity research analyst. Being No.1 Asian utility analyst from poll run by Institutional Investor (II) Magazine for 13 consecutive years (2007-2019).
