= St. Maarten Academy =

Secondary school in Sint Maarten

St. Maarten Academy is a private secondary school in Sint Maarten with two campuses: Main campus in Cul-de-Sac, and PSVE in Ebenezer. It is subsidized by the Sint Maarten government.

It is an English medium school and opened in 1974.

Its current principal is Lucas-Felix.
