= Adrian Holliday =

- Born: 1950 (age 75–76)

Academic background
- Education: London University (BSc); Lancaster University (MA, PhD)

Academic work
- Discipline: Linguist
- Sub-discipline: TESOL
- Institutions: Canterbury Christ Church University
- Website: adrianholliday.com

Adrian Holliday (born 1950) is Professor of Applied Linguistics and Intercultural Education at Canterbury Christ Church University. His teaching and research includes intercultural communication and ideology, discourses of culture, the politics of international English language education, English in the world, cultural imperialism, and qualitative research methods.

== Intercultural Communication ==
Holliday utilizes "grammar of culture" at the University of Guanajuato in Mexico to discuss and make sense of different issues concerning communication between cultures. He examines statements from students and textbooks to explain the differences between American or British norms and their own cultural norms. The students learned to recognize and transfer communicative competence from their existing language(s) to also recognize and use the resources of their existing cultural experiences. An example is the idea that people respect others of a different culture due to it being a custom or norm in "their culture."

== Native-speakerism ==
Holliday defines native-speakerism as "a pervasive ideology within ELT, characterized by the belief that 'native-speaker' teachers represent a 'Western culture' from which spring the ideals both of the English language and of English language teaching methodology."
