= Oxford Road, Hong Kong =

Road in Kowloon Tong, Hong Kong

Oxford Road
- Traditional Chinese: 牛津道
- Simplified Chinese: 牛津道
Transcriptions
Standard Mandarin
- Hanyu Pinyin: niu2 jin1 dao4
Yue: Cantonese
- Jyutping: ngau4 zeon1 dou6

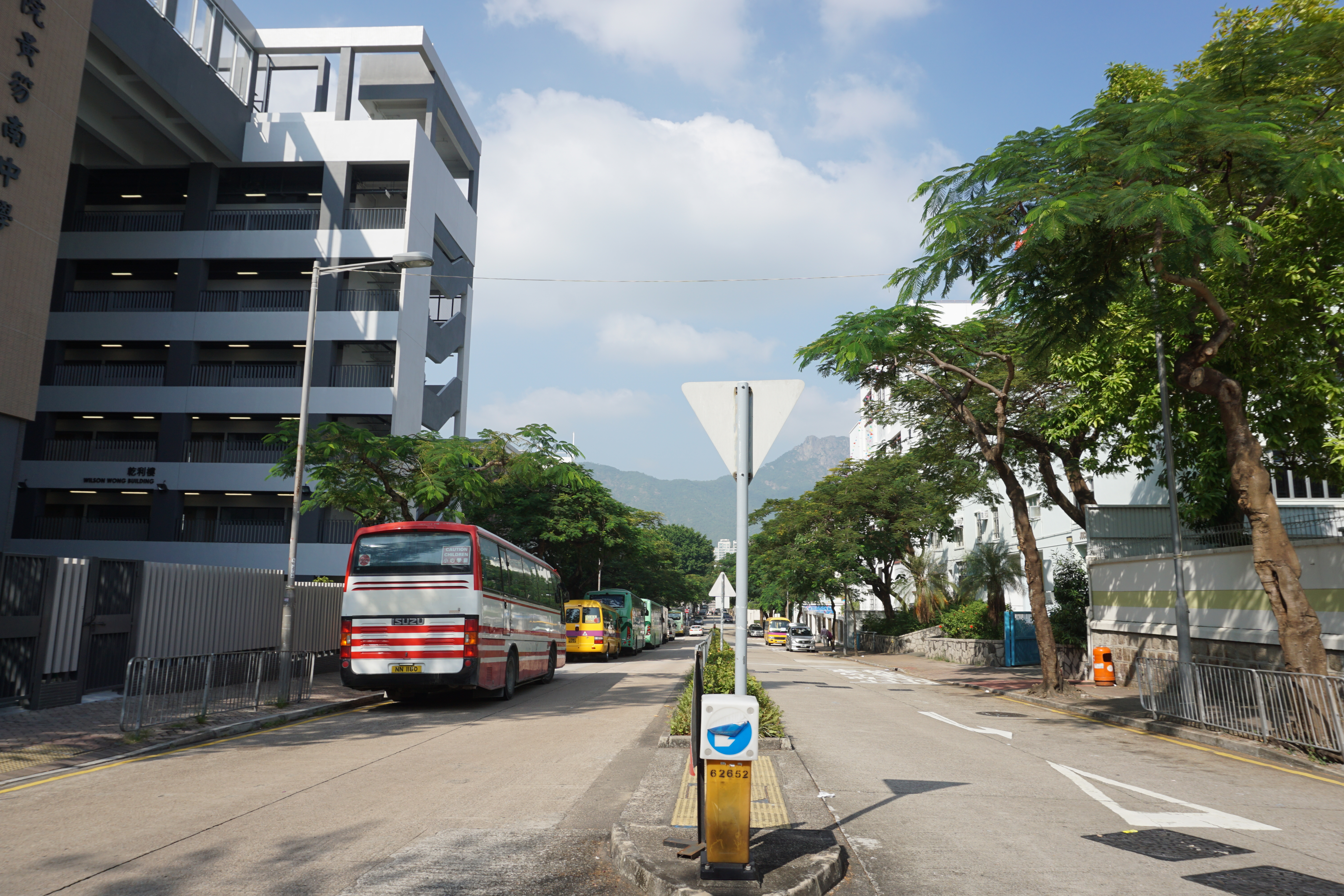
Oxford Road, south end

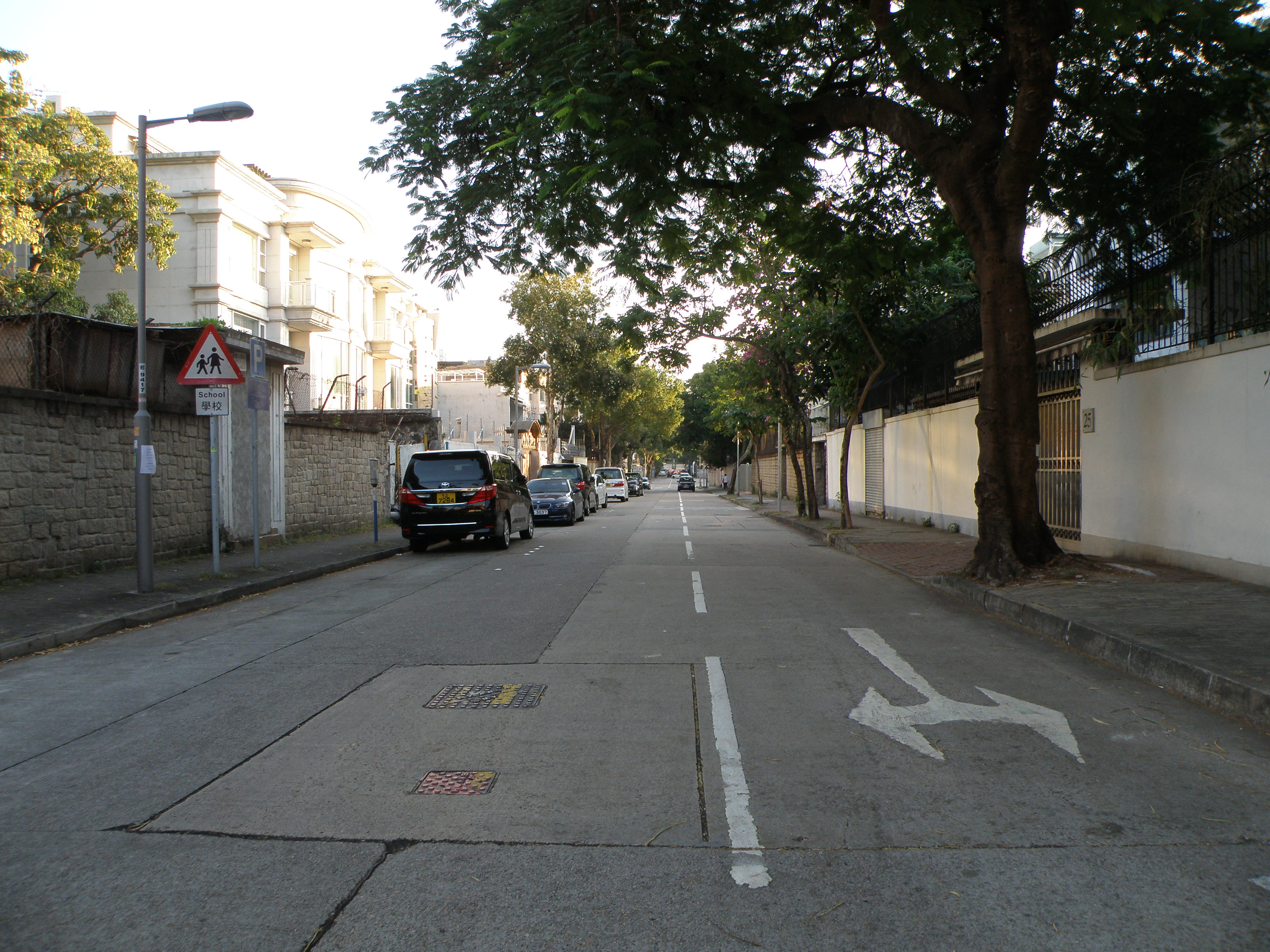
Oxford Road, north end

Oxford Road (Chinese: 牛津道; Jyutping: ngau4 zeon1 dou6) is a two-way street in Kowloon Tsai (often regarded as Kowloon Tong), Kowloon City District, Hong Kong.

== History ==
Oxford Road was built as part of a land development project by the Kowloon Tong and New Territories Development Company founded by Charles Montague Ede, member of the Legislative Council and other British merchants. The company was inspired by Ebeneezer Howard's 'garden city' urban concept for their plans to build a residential district in the 40 hectares of land near the Kowloon-Canton Railway.

Completed in mid-1950s, Oxford Road was named after Oxford, England as one of the Kowloon Tong streets which were named after places in Britain by the British colonial authorities. Oxford, being a heritage-rich city in England, was chosen as the first name of all the Kowloon Tong streets.

== Location ==
Oxford Road runs from Oxford Road Playground to Hereford Road near Sunderland Estate. Succeeding Flint Road at a roundabout near Ho Tung Road, Oxford Road runs northward in a divided dual-carriageway until it meets Lancashire Road near Lannox Gardens. Crossing the junction, Oxford Road merges into a two-way street which continues to run northbound. It meets Moray Road, Selkirk Road and Hampshire Road respectively on the west side and then intersects with Durham Road near Kowloon Tsai House tennis court. After Durham Road, Oxford Road meets Wiltshire Road on the west and finally terminates at Hereford Road near Sunderland Estate and Mary Rose School.

== Features ==
Oxford Road is home to many schools such as, beginning from Oxford Road Playground, Maryknoll Convent School, Caritas Francis Hsu College, Creative Primary School, TWGHs Wong Fut Nam College, Jockey Club Government Secondary School, Kei Wa Primary School (Kowloon Tong) and Bishop Hall Jubilee School, together with, formerly, Ying Wa College and Pui Shing Middle School (Renamed Pui Shing Catholic Secondary School in 1992).

== See also ==
- List of streets and roads in Hong Kong
