= Yuen Long Catholic Secondary School =

Secondary school in Yuen Long, Hong Kong

Coordinates: 22.444797°N 114.020984°E

- 元朗天主教中學
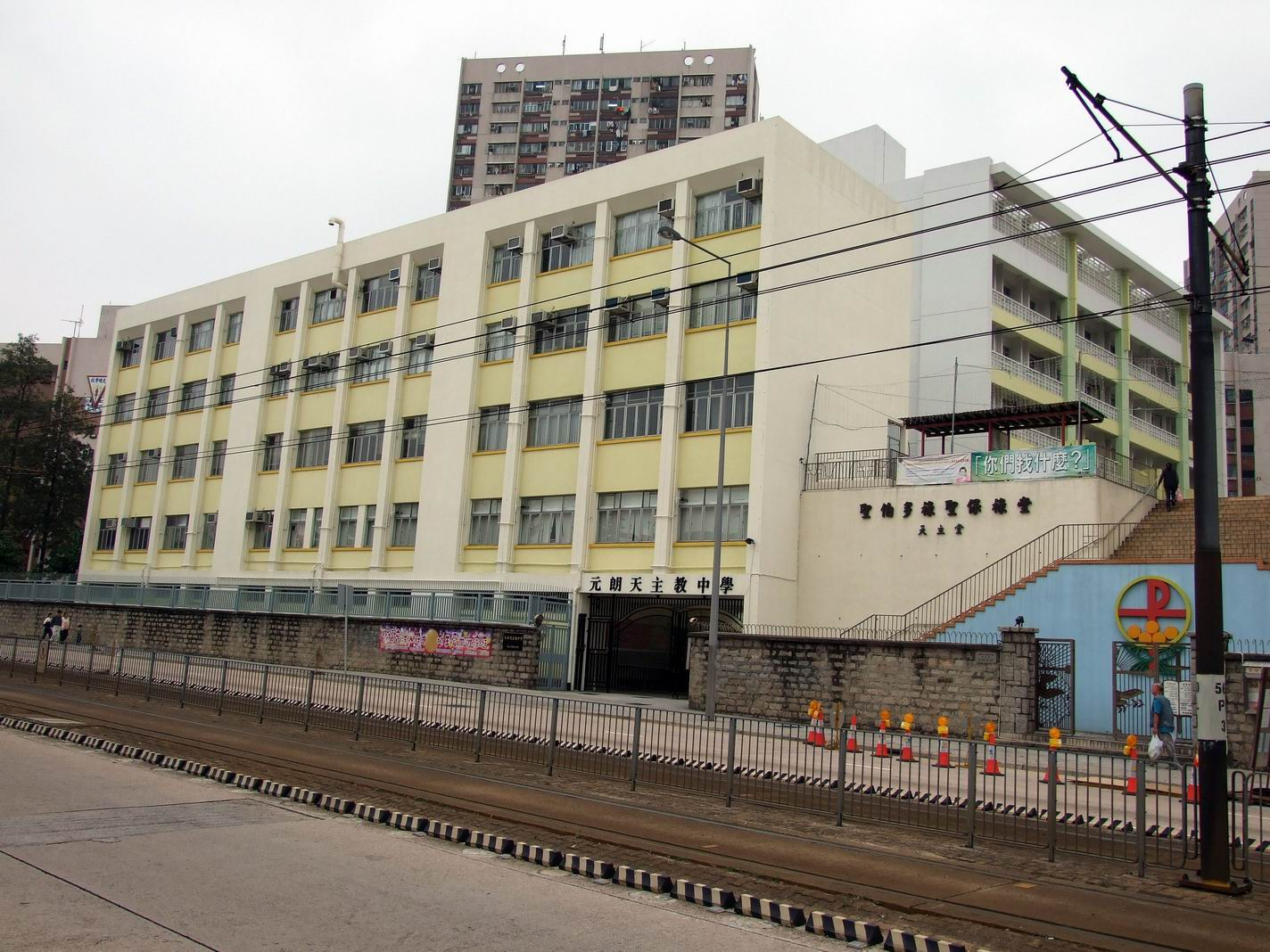
- 201 Castle Peak Road, Shui Pin Wai Tsuen, Yuen Long, New Territories, Hong Kong

Information
- Type: Subsidized grammar school (co-educational)
- Established: 1995
- Principal: 古莉生
- Faith: Catholicism
- Forms: Form One to Form Six

Yuen Long Catholic Secondary School
- Traditional Chinese: 元朗天主教中學
- Simplified Chinese: 元朗天主教中学
Transcriptions
Standard Mandarin
- Hanyu Pinyin: Yuán Lǎng Tiānzhǔjiào Zhōngxué
Yue: Cantonese
- Jyutping: jyun4 long5 tin1 zyu2 gaau3 zung1 hok6

Yuen Long Catholic Secondary School (Chinese: 元朗天主教中學), which was established in 1995 by Catholic Diocese of Hong Kong, is a subsidized co-educational school located in Hong Kong. Being a vocational school since 1995, it was changed into a grammar school in 2002. It held 22 classes in 2007–2008.
