= Schools Sports Federation of Hong Kong, China =

The Schools Sports Federation of Hong Kong, China
- 中國香港學界體育聯會
- Abbreviation: HKSSF
- Formation: September 1, 1997; 29 years ago
- Type: Sport federation
- Location: Hong Kong
- Website: http://www.hkssf.org.hk

The Schools Sports Federation of Hong Kong, China (HKSSF, Chinese: 中國香港學界體育聯會) is a non-profit schools sports organisation based in Hong Kong. Formed on 1 September 1997, it is the sports governing body of different major school sports events, organising local secondary and primary schools inter-school, inter-area competitions. As well as other "Jing-ying" (Chinese: 精英, elite), inter-port, overseas and international school sports competitions.

The organisation also established and owned the Hong Kong Schools Sports Federation football team, which is formed by students from Hong Kong secondary schools.

From 2015 to 2018, Hong Kong Schools Sports Federation organised the "Nike All Hong Kong Schools Jing Ying Basketball Tournament".

== Events organised ==
=== Primary schools ===
- Athletics
- Badminton
- Basketball
- Fencing
- Futsal
- 5-a-side handball
- Games
- Gymnastics
- Squash
- Swimming
- Table tennis
- Tennis
- Touch rugby
- Volleyball

=== Secondary schools ===
- Archery
- Athletics
- Badminton
- Basketball
- Beach volleyball
- Cross country
- Fencing
- Football
- Girls football
- Gymnastics
- Handball
- Hockey
- Indoor rowing
- Life saving
- Netball
- Rugby sevens
- Softball
- Squash
- Swimming
- Table tennis
- Tennis
- Ten-pin bowling
- Volleyball

The HKSSF organises major sports events such as the Hong Kong Inter-School Athletics Competition, a competition that aims to explore young talents in track and field events, performing selection for Hong Kong representation at interport, Asian and World Competition.
