= CCC Kei Yuen College =

Aided school in Hong Kong

- 中華基督教會基元中學
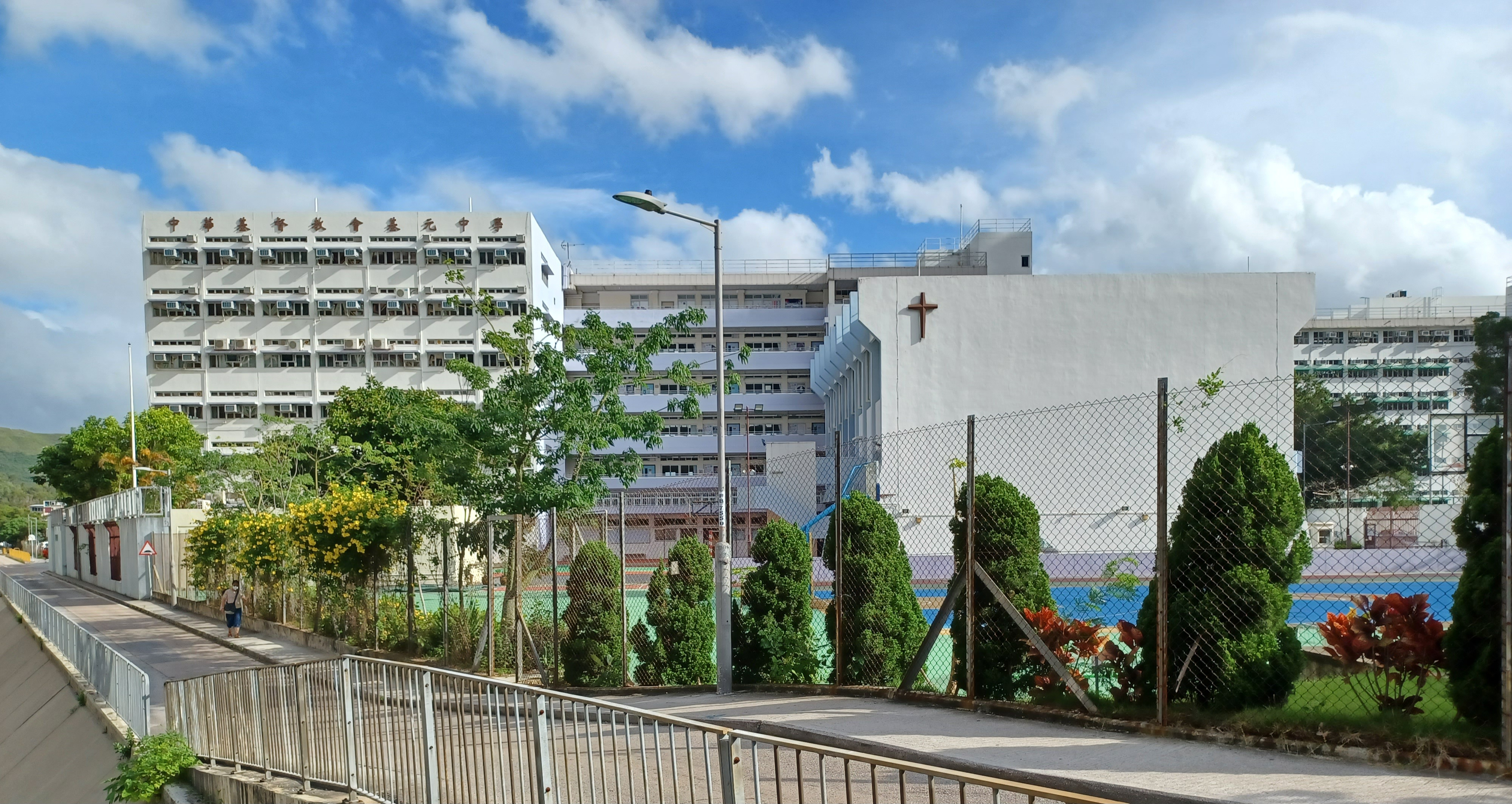
- Hong KongYuen Long East Fung Yau Street

Information
- Other name: 中華基督教會基元中學
- Type: Aided
- Motto: We will in all things grow up into him who is the head, that is, Christ. （Ephesians 4:15）
- Religious affiliation: Protestantism / Christianity
- Established: 1982
- School district: Yuen Long
- Director: Dr. Taw Jin Liam
- Principal: Mr. Cheng Lai Lam Felix
- Staff: 63
- Enrollment: 1,123
- Colors: Light blue and light purple
- Affiliation: Hong Kong Council of the Church of Christ in China
- Website: ccckyc.edu.hk

CCC Kei Yuen College
- Traditional Chinese: 中華基督教會基元中學
- Simplified Chinese: 中华基督教会基元中学
Transcriptions
Standard Mandarin
- Hanyu Pinyin: Zhōnghuá Jīdūjiàohuì Jī Yuán Zhōngxué
Yue: Cantonese
- Jyutping: zung1 waa4 gei1 duk1 gaau3 wui6*2 gei1 jyun4 zung1 hok6

CCC Kei Yuen College (Chinese: 中華基督教會基元中學) is an aided co-ed Secondary school, mainly for band 1 students in Yuen Long. The school is located in Fung Yau Street South, established in 1982. CCC Kei Yuen College is a Christian grammar school founded by the Hong Kong Council of the Church of Christ in China (HKCCCC).

== Campus ==
CCC Kei Yuen College is located in the South-East of Yuen Long, with a 7000-meter-square area.
