= New Territories Heung Yee Kuk Yuen Long District Secondary School =

Secondary school in Hong Kong

Coordinates: 22.4428°N 114.0227°E

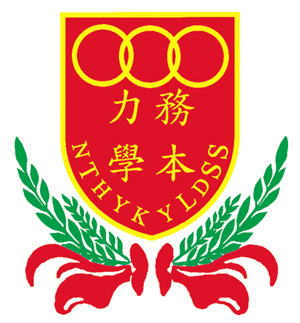

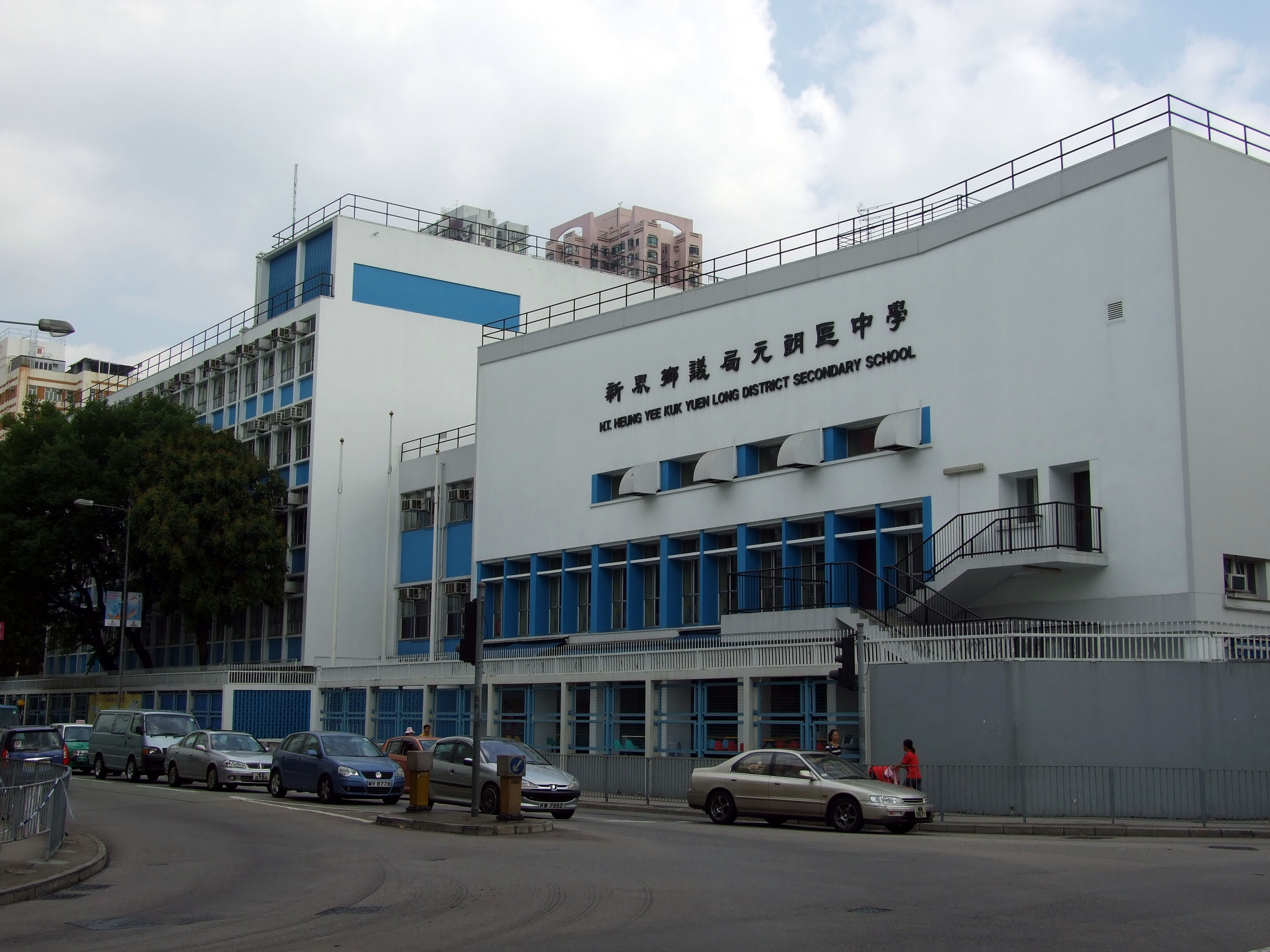
- School building
- 123 Kau Yuk Road, Yuen Long, Hong Kong

Information
- Motto: 務本力學 (English: "conscientiousness and diligence")
- Established: 1967; 59 years ago
- School district: Yuen Long
- Staff: 61
- Enrollment: 1271
- Affiliation: Hong Kong Government
- Teaching Language: English
- Website: http://www.nthykyldss.edu.hk

New Territories Heung Yee Kuk Yuen Long District Secondary School
- Traditional Chinese: 新界鄉議局元朗區中學
- Simplified Chinese: 新界乡议局元朗区中学
Transcriptions
Standard Mandarin
- Hanyu Pinyin: Xīnjiè Xiāng Yì Jú Yuán Lǎng qū Zhōngxué
Yue: Cantonese
- Jyutping: san1 gaai3 hoeng1 ji5 guk6 jyun4 long5 keoi1 zung1 hok6

The New Territories Heung Yee Kuk Yuen Long District Secondary School (abbreviated as NTHYKYLDSS) (Chinese: 新界鄉議局元朗區中學) is a Hong Kong secondary school located in Yuen Long, New Territories. Its motto is in Chinese "務本力學", meaning "conscientiousness and diligence". The official medium of instruction is English.

== History ==
The foundation-laying ceremony of the school was held in 1966. The school opened in 1967, using the campus of the Yuen Long Public Secondary School until 1968, when the construction was completed. The opening ceremony was then held in 1969, with Sir David Trench as the officiator. The school council was established on the same year, with Ho Chuen Yiu as the chairman. In 1970, Tang Yuek Fan took over as the chairman of the school.

In 1983, Lau Wong-fat took over as the chairman of the school council. The parent-teacher association was also founded in 1985. The alumni association was founded in 1990.

The education department planned to expand the school campus. The construction started in 1996 and was finished in 1998. In 1999, the use of information technology was adapted.
