= English-medium education =

Medium of instruction

An English-medium education system is one that uses English as the primary medium of instruction—particularly where English is not the mother tongue of students.

Initially this is associated with the expansion of English from its homeland in England and the lowlands of Scotland and its spread to the rest of Great Britain and Ireland, beginning in the sixteenth century. The rise of the British Empire increased the language's spread to British colonies, and in many of these it has remained the medium of education. The increased economic and cultural influence of the United States since World War II has also furthered the global spread of English, as has the rapid spread of Internet and other technologies. As a result of this, there are English-medium schools in many states throughout the world where English is not the predominant language. Also in higher education, due to the recent trend towards internationalization, an increasing number of degree courses, particularly at master's level, are being taught through the medium of English.

Known as English-medium instruction (EMI), or ICLHE (integrating content and language in higher education), this rapidly growing phenomenon has been contested in many contexts.

== By country ==
=== Canada ===
Education is a provincial matter under the Canadian constitution, section 92. French language rights have been guaranteed in the province of Quebec since the Treaty of Paris 1763, French outside of Quebec and all other minority languages have faced laws against them at one time or another. English-only education laws were gradually rolled out across Canada during the nineteenth and twentieth centuries, culminating in the Manitoba Schools Question in 1896 and Regulation 17 in Ontario in 1912, which both targeted French and other European minority languages, and the Indian residential schools system which attacked Aboriginal languages.

These policies were gradually abolished in the wake of Canada's adoption of official bilingualism (French/English) in 1969 and multiculturalism in 1971, but English remains the predominant language of education outside of Quebec and New Brunswick.

=== Wales ===
In medieval Wales, Welsh schools used Latin as the medium of instruction due to their close relationship with the Catholic Church, though by the 15th century Wales' social elite increasingly viewed learning English as an important step in their education. Wales was incorporated into the Kingdom of England as a result of the English Parliament's Laws in Wales Acts 1535 and 1542; the acts also established English as the official language of administration and justice in Wales, along with creating a more developed system of local government. This resulted in several grammar schools being established in the 16th and 17th centuries to cater to this demand, all of which taught in English or Latin with students being expected to have learnt adequate English before starting; several grammar schools forbade the use of Welsh in instruction. In the early 1670s, the English clergyman Thomas Gouge began preaching in Wales, and by 1675 he had established 87 schools which were attended by a total of 2,225 students. The schools, which used English as the medium of instruction, were intended "to teach the poor Welsh children to read and write English, cast Accompts [numeracy] and repeat the Catechism". However, these schools closed after Gouge died in 1681.

In the early 18th century, several charity schools were established with the support of the Society for Promoting Christian Knowledge (SPCK). By 1714, nearly 100 SPCK schools had been founded in Wales. In the 1730s, the Welsh clergyman Griffith Jones began establishing several "circular schools" in Wales, which aimed to cater to students of all ages. While circular schools used Welsh only, charity schools utilised a mixture of Welsh and English as a medium of instruction; the typical medium of instruction in the SPCK schools was English but speaking Welsh in the schools was not restricted and over 12 schools in North Wales were conducted in Welsh. As noted by the academic Russell Grigg, English was used where it was the local preference. Endowments for 18th-century elementary schools in Wales sometimes specified Welsh or English as the language to be used, but this did not always reflect the reality of how lessons were conducted. The Sunday schools established in Wales in the late 18th century were conducted in Welsh.

During the 19th century, there was an increasing push for English-medium education in Welsh schools. Welsh parents were keen for their children to learn English; knowing the language was felt to be a route to social mobility, made life more convenient and was a status symbol. The upper- and middle-classes in Wales, who generally spoke English, were also eager for the masses to learn the language, believing it would contribute to Wales's economic development and that Anglophone tenants or employees would be easier to manage. Day schools in Wales, which had often been created by voluntary societies in the early 19th century, used English as the sole medium of instruction. The Welsh Not was a form of discipline used at some English-medium Welsh schools. The details of the practice varied; in general, children would be given an object when they were caught speaking Welsh and pass it on if they heard another child speaking the language. The child holding the object at the end of the day would be punished.

In 2025, Gwynedd Council, the county council of Gwynedd, announced it would be phasing out English-medium education as the main language in the county's state schools.

=== Ireland ===
The poet Edmund Spenser wrote in (1596) a recommendation that "the Irish ... be educated in English, in grammar and in science ... for learning hath that wonderful power of itself that it can soften and temper the most stern and savage nature."

The setting up of 'Royal Schools' in Ireland, was proclaimed in 1608 by James I, with the intended purpose "that there shall be one Free School at least appointed in every County, for the education of youth in learning and religion."

These schools provided an English-medium education to the sons of landed settlers in Ireland, most of whom were of Scottish or English descent.

However, only five such schools were actually set up; The Royal School, Armagh in County Armagh, Portora Royal School in County Fermanagh, The Cavan Royal School in County Cavan, The Royal School Dungannon in Tyrone and The Royal and Prior School in County Donegal.

The National Education System (sic) was founded in 1831, by the British Government, under the direction of the Chief Secretary, E.G. Stanley. Some 2,500 national schools were established in Ulster in the period 1832–1870, built with the aid of the Commissioners of National Education and local trustees.

S. Ó Buachalla states:

During the first four decades of their existence, there is no mention of the Irish language in the programme of regulations of the Commissioners of National Education; furthermore no provision whatsoever was made in 1831 when the original scheme was drawn up for education of those children who spoke Irish only. According to the official opinion of later Commissioners, expressed in a formal reply to the Chief Secretary in 1884, " the anxiety of the promoters of the National Scheme was to encourage the cultivation of the English language.

The Irish patriot P.H. Pearse published a series of studies of the English-medium education system in Ireland. His article entitled The Murder Machine embodies an article which appeared in the Irish Review for February 1913.

Pearse wrote in his pamphlet the following:

And English education in Ireland has seemed: to some like the bed of Procustes, the bed on which all men that passed that way must lie, be it never so big for them, be it never so small for them: the traveller for whom it was too large had his limbs stretched until he filled it; the traveller for whom it was too small had his limbs chopped off until he fitted into it—comfortably. It was a grim jest to play upon travellers. The English have done it to Irish children not by way of jest, but with a purpose. Our English-Irish systems took, and take, absolutely no cognisance of the differences between individuals, of the differences between localities, of the: differences between urban and rural communities, of the differences springing from a different ancestry, Gaelic or Anglo-Saxon.

=== Scotland ===
In medieval and early modern Scotland, several attempts were made by Scottish authorities to establish English at first among the Scottish aristocracy and increasingly amongst all ranks by education acts and parish schools. The Parliament of Scotland passed ten such acts between 1494 and 1698. In 1609, the Scottish government implemented the Statutes of Iona, which required Highland clan chiefs to send their heirs to the Lowlands to be educated in English-speaking Protestant schools. Among the items listed in the statues was the "planting of the gospell among these rude, barbarous, and uncivill people" by Protestant churches; the outlawing of bards who were traditionally on circuit between the houses of Highland nobility; the requirement that all men of wealth send their heirs to be educated in Lowland schools where they would be taught to "speik, reid, and wryte Inglische."

The then King James VI of Scotland, followed this by the School Establishment Act 1616, which sought to establish schools in every parish in the Scottish Highlands so that "the youth be exercised and trayned up in civilitie, godlines, knawledge, and learning, that the vulgar Inglische toung be universallie plantit, and the Irische language, whilk is one of the chief and principall causes of the continewance of barbaritie and incivilitie amongis the inhabitantis of the Ilis and Heylandis, may be abolisheit and removeit."

In 1709 the Society in Scotland for Propagating Christian Knowledge (SSPCK) was established in order to further funding sources for Highland church schools. All manner of incentives and punishments were used to stop children from speaking Scottish Gaelic. The SSPCK had five schools by 1711, 25 by 1715, 176 by 1758 and 189 by 1808, by then with 13,000 pupils attending. At first the SSPCK avoided using the Gaelic language with the result that pupils ended up learning by rote without understanding what they were reading. In 1741 the SSPCK introduced a Gaelic-English vocabulary, then in 1766 brought in a New Testament with facing pages of Gaelic and English texts for both languages to be read alongside one another, with more success. After a number of years of unsuccessful attempts at English-only teaching methods, it was realized that literacy in Gaelic was a much more effective means of teaching and a bridge towards fluency in English.

Since 1918 education acts have provided for teaching Gaelic in Gaelic-speaking areas, but development was very slow until Gaelic became an initial teaching medium in the Gaelic areas of Inverness-shire and Ross-shire from 1958. In 1975 the newly created Western Isles education authority introduced bilingual primary education shortly followed by Highland Region in Skye. Gaelic-medium primary education commenced with two schools in 1985, growing to 42 units by 1993/94.

In secondary education, Gaelic has long been taught as a subject—often through the medium of English, even to native speakers. A move towards bilingual secondary education in the Western Isles was frustrated by a change of government in the 1979 United Kingdom general election. Gaelic-medium secondary education has developed less satisfactorily. Gaelic-medium streams followed on from primary in Glasgow and Inverness, with some experimentation in the Western Isles, but the sector is hampered by acute teacher shortage, and an Ofsted inspectorate report of 1994 regarded Gaelic-medium secondary education as divisive and inappropriate.

Third level provision through Gaelic is provided by Sabhal Mòr Ostaig (literally: "the great barn at Ostaig") a Gaelic-medium college based in Sleat, on the Isle of Skye in north west Scotland. It is part of the University of the Highlands and Islands, and also has a campus on Islay known as Ionad Chaluim Chille Ìle.

In 2004, Prince Charles, Duke of Rothesay, (who is patron of the College) stated that:

The beauty of Gaelic music and song is inescapable. But without the living language, it risks becoming an empty shell. That is why an education system, up to the level represented by the college here in Skye, is so important – to ensure fluency and literacy which will continue to renew the health and creativity of the language.

The Gaelic Language (Scotland) Act 2005 is the first piece of legislation to give formal recognition to the Gaelic language in Scotland. It recognises Gaelic as an official language of Scotland, commanding "equal respect" with English. Education Minister Peter Peacock, who has ministerial responsibility for Gaelic, said: "This is a momentous day for Gaelic as we open a new chapter in the language's history. We have come a long way since the dark days of 1616 when an Act of Parliament ruled that Gaelic should be 'abolishit and removit' from Scotland."

=== Cornwall ===
In 1549, the Prayer Book Rebellion erupted in Cornwall and Devon partially in response to the introduction of the Book of Common Prayer and English-language church services by the government. The articles of the rebels stated: "and we the cornyshe men (whereof certen of vs vnderstande no Englysh) vtterly refuse thys new English." Following the rebellion's suppression, the Cornish language rapidly declined as Cornwall's gentry adopting English to dissociate themselves from the reputation for disloyalty and rebellion associated with the Cornish language. As Cornish declined over the course of the early modern era, this was reflected in Cornwall's schools, which gradually began utilising English as the sole language of instruction.

=== India ===
English is the principal medium of instruction in Indian higher education. This originates from the period of British rule, where during the 19th century authorities in London and India gradually introduced English-medium education. The Charter Act 1813 decreed that English would be taught in British India's educational systems although not as a replacement for indigenous languages. Instead, it was anticipated that English would co-exist with indigenous languages. In 1835 Lord William Bentinck revitalised the Charter Act with his New Education Policy which determined that English should be the official language of justice, diplomacy and administration in British India; prior to this, Farsi had been the accepted language of diplomacy. The policy led to a rapid expansion of English-medium education in India as fluency in English granted India's upper and middle classes access to positions in the colonial government or other relatively prestigious jobs.

During the 21st century, demand for private schools have rapidly increased in India, which some scholars have attributed to higher demand for English-medium education. At Indian private schools, the medium of education is often English, but Hindi or the state's official language is also taught as a compulsory subject. As of 2022, a quarter of all Indian children attend private schools. Data collected by the National Institute of Educational Planning and Administration showed that the number of Indian students studying in English-medium schools increased by 274% between 2003 and 2011 to over 20 million students. Anil Gupta of the Indian Institute of Management Ahmedabad claimed that rising number of English-medium schools in India were "capitalising on the huge aspirations of people wanting to improve themselves economically. The desire for education is no more an argument."

=== Malaysia ===
Up until 1981 in West Malaysia (and some years later in East Malaysia), there were English-medium schools set up by the former British colonial government and Christian missionaries. However, following the implementation of the National Language Act 1967 which stipulated the conversion of all English-medium schools to Malay-medium schools, all English-medium schools were completely phased out. The policy has now left many new graduates unemployed as they struggle to find jobs, especially in the private sector, due to a lack of English proficiency; they can only depend on public sector jobs provided by the government. This has drawn criticism over the policy by local governments from East Malaysia who are now feeling the impacts on their younger generations caused by the federal government's long-standing policy which has neglected the importance of mastering the universal language of English. By 2016, Sarawak had begun to support the re-establishment of English-medium schools and a request for the approval of more English-medium schools in the state from the federal government, using its autonomy in education. The move was followed by Sabah in 2017 when a minister from the state also urged the return of English-medium schools, which gained support from other ministers.

=== Indonesia ===
English-medium schools in Indonesia consist of international schools and National Plus schools. A National Plus school in Indonesia is a school that offers education beyond the minimum requirements of the national Indonesian accreditation authorities. National Plus schools offer some subjects taught in English and may provide some native English speakers on staff or may offer international curricula such as from Cambridge International Examinations (CIE) or the International Baccalaureate Organisation (IBO). National Plus schools can typically be differentiated from international schools by their core market. International schools tend to primarily exist to serve the needs of expatriate students and national plus schools for Indonesian students; however, there is significant overlap on both sides.

=== Pakistan ===
The Government of Pakistan has recently announced the introduction of English lessons on a phased basis to all schools across the country. This new policy states that "English language has been made compulsory from Class-1 onwards" and the "Introduction of English as medium of instruction for science, mathematics, computer science and other selected subjects like economics and geography in all schools in a graduated manner." Caretaker Minister for Education Mr. Shujaat Ali Beg declared 25 January 2008 that 18 colleges of the city of Karachi would be made "Model English Medium Colleges,"

=== Rwanda ===
Rwandan schools began using English as a medium of instruction following the Rwandan Genocide and the rise to power of the RPF. In 1996, Rwandan language policy was revised to include English as an official language, and schools became free to use either English or French as a medium of instruction. In November 2008, the Rwandan cabinet passed a resolution requiring all publicly funded schools to switch to English-medium instruction by early 2009. Research on Rwanda’s rapid adoption of English‑medium instruction has highlighted the pedagogical problems and structural inequalities generated by such reforms. Practical problems were raised by the decision, including that there was a severe lack of trained English teachers. Rwanda has been used as a case study demonstrating how English‑medium reforms may be shaped less by pedagogical considerations than by political and economic objectives, including justifying free market economic reforms and establishing cultural hegemony.

=== Bangladesh ===
In Bangladesh the system of education is divided into three different branches. Students are free to choose any one of them provided that they have the means. These branches are: The English Medium, The Bengali Medium, and The Religious Branch. In the English Medium system, courses are all taught in English using English books with the exception for Bengali and Arabic. English-medium schools are mainly private and thus traditionally were reserved for the upper and upper middle class. However huge demand in urban areas has resulted in large number of English-medium schools mushrooming. This has caused a fall in quality. O and A level exams are arranged through the British Council in Dhaka.

=== Myanmar ===
In Myanmar, the education system is based on the British Colonial model, due to nearly a century of British and Christian presences. Nearly all schools are government-operated, and also there has been a recent increase in privately funded English language schools.

=== The Philippines ===
The United States of America won the Philippine–American War (1898–1901), and declared the Philippines a US colony. US imperial rule followed. Mac Síomóin quotes the Filipino scholar E. San Juan who made the following comment regarding the use made by the US administration of the English language to rule his country:

Its conquest of hegemony or consensual rule was literally accomplished through the deployment of English as the official medium of business, schooling and government. This pedagogical strategy was designed to cultivate an intelligencia, a middle stratum divorced from its roots in the plebeian masses, who would service the ideological apparatus of Anglo-Saxon supremacy. Americanization was mediated through English, sanctioned as the language of prestige and aspiration.

English is used for instruction at all Universities in The Philippines.

=== Italy ===
In Italy education is provided in Italian and, by law, it is mandatory until the age of 16. However, there are some English-medium schools which follow the International Baccalaureate Organization program (which is recognized by Italian Ministry of Education). Its principles refer to the idea of an international and global education, combining pedagogical principles with strict standards.

In Italian high-schools, since 2010, some subjects can be taught in a language different from Italian (according to the concept of Content and Language Integrated Learning (CLIL) in order to strengthen the students' linguistic competences.

==== Primary schools ====
Although the national education system is held in Italian, by law, it's possible for children to attend international private schools (which are considered equivalent in their status – they are called "scuole paritarie") that use English as the only language for education.

English-medium primary schools in Italy follow the International Baccalaureate Organization program which has a sub-section dedicated to children (Primary Years Program – which includes children from 3 to 12 years old).

==== Secondary schools ====
Secondary education is made up of lower secondary schools (from 12 to 14) and upper secondary schools (from 14 to 19). In both cases, children have the possibility to attend entirely English-taught schools.

Concerning middle schools, some of them offer the IB Middle Years Programme (MYP), which is addressed to students aged 11 to 16; the majority of these schools are located in regions of Northern and Northern-Central Italy. Concluding this course of studies, Italian children come to the end of compulsory education.

Since 2010, the content and language integrated learning (CLIL) approach has been applied in all high schools, through the teaching of a non-linguistic subject in a foreign language (L2), including English (this methodology has been implemented in graduation year, except for "liceo linguistico", where it has been introduced in the third year and fourth year with a second language). Students aged 16–19 can choose to attend the IB Diploma Programme (DP), which is recognised by some universities. This two-year curriculum is mostly provided by schools in Northern and Northern-Central Italy. It is more widely available than the Middle Years Programme.

==== Higher education ====
Italian universities mainly provide courses taught in Italian, but in recent years there has been an increase in the number of English-taught programmes, especially in master's degrees. According to law, it is possible for universities to hold classes in a language different from Italian (particularly English), in order to promote cultural exchanges and student mobility, as well as strengthening the cooperation with foreign universities. Nowadays there are some bachelor's and master's degrees that exclusively use English as their vehicular language, while some others are held only partially in English.

In 2012 a controversy sparked between the university senate of the Polytechnic University of Milan and some of its professors, regarding the decision to use English as the sole language of all the master's degrees and the PhDs. The Italian Constitutional Court examined the matter and delivered the judgment n° 42/2017 which states that the complete exclusion of Italian from these courses clashes with the principle of primacy of the Italian language enshrined in the Constitution. Furthermore, the court explained that the internationalization of the universities cannot be achieved by marginalizing the Italian language, therefore there must be a balance between the offers provided by the university in the two languages.

=== Slovenia ===
The University of Ljubljana teaches at least 100 courses in English. In Where to Invade Next, Michael Moore interviews several American citizens studying at the university who were taking courses taught in English.

=== Kyrgyzstan ===
Education in the Kyrgyz Republic is compulsory for nine years between the ages of 7 and 16. This is broken up into four years of primary, five years of high school, and two additional years of high school or vocational school. The majority of instruction is in Kyrgyz, but the language of instruction in mostly higher institutions is Russian. The Ministry of Education and Science of the Kyrgyz Republic introduced the English language into the syllabus as an additional language for grades 3–11 in educational institutions. According to the Ministry of Education of Kyrgyzstan, the main purpose of teaching English is to teach the basic level of foreign language, as under market conditions knowledge of English is necessary. A number of private schools and universities are involved in English-medium education. In some private universities in Kyrgyzstan, such as American University of Central Asia (AUCA), International Alatoo University (IAU), University of Central Asia (UCA), OSCE Academy in Bishkek students are taught exclusively in English. English language viewed in the minds of the young generation of Kyrgyz Republic with the possibility of receiving education abroad, job opportunities, travel purposes and getting information from English language sources.

=== South Africa ===
==== Colonial education ====
The earliest European schools in South Africa were established in the Cape Colony in the late seventeenth century by Dutch Reformed Church elders committed to biblical instruction, which was necessary for church confirmation. In rural areas, itinerant teachers (meesters) taught basic literacy and math skills. British mission schools proliferated after 1799, when the first members of the London Missionary Society arrived in the Cape Colony.[8]

Language soon became a sensitive issue in education. At least two dozen English-language schools operated in rural areas of the Cape Colony by 1827, but their presence rankled among devout Afrikaners, who considered the English language and curriculum irrelevant to rural life and Afrikaner values. Throughout the nineteenth century, Afrikaners resisted government policies aimed at the spread of the English language and British values, and many educated their children at home or in the churches.

==== Milner Schools ====
In order to anglicize the Transvaal area during the Anglo Boer war, Lord Milner set out to influence British education in the area for the English-speaking populations. He founded a series of schools known as the "Milner Schools" in South Africa. These schools consist of modern day Pretoria High School for Girls, Pretoria Boys High School, Potchefstroom High School for Boys, Hamilton Primary School, and St. Marys DSG.

== English-medium instruction (EMI) ==
Since the beginning of the twentieth century there has been a sharp increase in the number of universities across the globe that offer English taught programmes (ETPs), that is degree courses which are taught through the medium of English, though these universities are located in countries where English is not an official language. This phenomenon, generally known as English-medium instruction, is seen as part of the internationalization process that many universities are pushing. There is a growing body of research literature on this phenomenon which explores issues such as the development of EMI in different countries, reasons for the spread of EMI, lecturers' and students' beliefs about EMI, learning gains in terms of English proficiency and the effect on learning academic subjects through English. It is now also recognized that teaching EMI is not the same as teaching in the shared mother tongue, and some specialized guides and handbooks are now available for teachers. The spread of EMI has also been criticized and contested in many countries and in the research literature. It has led to concerns about the quality of education, its impact on student learning, accessibility to education and its impact on linguistic diversity and social justice. Despite its rampant spread, EMI's effect on improving student proficiency of English is still an under-investigated phenomenon in research literature, although a few handbooks and research volumes are available that propose innovative ways of addressing the problems of EMI and exploiting its strong points.

=== EMI in Europe ===
In Europe there has been a sharp increase in the number of ETPs in the 21st century. According to Wachter and Maiworm's study, there were just 725 English-taught programs in 2001, 2,389 in 2007 and in their 2014 study the number had risen to 8,089. Although there may be some problems with the study and the numbers may not be entirely accurate, there has been an exponential increase in the last 20 years. The country with the highest number of ETPs is the Netherlands (1,078 in 2014) , though the growth (39.3%) has been below the European average.

Although there has been a considerable growth in the number of ETPs, largely at master's level, it is a minority of students (less than 2%), that are actually enrolled in ETPs.

=== China ===
==== Mainland China ====
A number of universities are involved in English-medium education through the International Scholarly Exchange Curriculum program (ISEC program). The ISEC program establishes a platform for those universities to communicate with other international institutions who use English-medium education. Other universities that offer English-medium education (China–foreign cooperative universities), also known as branch campuses, include the University of Nottingham Ningbo, China; United International College; Xi'an Jiaotong-Liverpool University; Shanghai New York University; and Wenzhou-Kean University. In 2018 there were over 1000 such China–foreign program partnerships, but over 200 were terminated due to concerns over quality.

==== Hong Kong ====
Secondary schools in Hong Kong are mainly categorised as EMI schools (English-medium schools) and CMI schools (Chinese-medium schools).

== Criticisms of English-medium instruction ==
Criticisms in English-medium instruction (EMI) refers to the exacerbation of global and local inequalities through the detrimental effects on linguistic and cultural diversity provoked by English-language teaching and in particular English-medium instruction.

The internationalisation of education provision, achieved in the European territory thanks to the Bologna Process and boosted by the increased importance of international rankings for universities, has produced a change in the core concept of education. British scholar Jacquelin Widin suggests that education as a public good is no longer a current value in itself but rather an item traded by the defenders of centralised wealth. Moreover, the indicators used in international rankings reward the percentage of international students enrolled in universities. In this situation, English has a hegemonic position in the higher education field. This is one of the reasons why in the last decade there has been a huge increase in the number of bachelor's and master's programmes where teaching is conducted entirely in English (English-taught programs, ETPs). In Europe, it increased from 725 to 8,089 in the period between 2001 and 2017.

Another reason is universities' interest in increasing their income, especially in places where domestic enrollment is decreasing. Furthermore, some institutions charge domestic students higher fees to enroll in EMI programmes. Enhancing the employability of domestic students, providing them with international competencies is another key motivating factor. Moreover, courses taught entirely in English are seen as indispensable for promoting mobility, cultural diversity, and intercultural understanding. In this situation, English native speakers have an unfair market advantage. On the other hand, non-native speakers have to reach an adequate level of English in order to fulfill the admission requirements in EMI courses.

The first issue is about equal access to English learning. Living in an urban or rural area as well as the socio-economic condition of the student have an impact on his chance to learn the English language. Especially in rural areas, there is a shortage of qualified teachers, a lack of appropriate instructional materials and, above all, the absence of a sociolinguistic environment in which English is meaningful. Socio-economic conditions influence both the range of possibilities of learning English (i.e. paying for a private English course, moving to an English-speaking country for a period to improve the level of English) and the effective access to an EMI course, considering that some universities charge higher fees for courses taught in English. Westernization is another issue. Robert Phillipson, who has written extensively on the topic of linguistic imperialism, is very critical of EMI, as he sees it as another form of linguistic imperialism perpetuating the stereotype that having a Western-style education is superior and something that is necessary for a successful future.

The use of English as a medium of instruction in non-English speaking countries may lead local languages to be inadequate in the future as a medium of higher education. One risk is they will not develop the necessary registers to express specific academic knowledge.

Another controversial issue is whether introducing EMI courses could in a certain way downgrade the courses taught in the local language. EMI courses might be considered elitist and may lead to discrimination even among students of the same university. Coming to the teaching side, lecturers may not be able to perform as well as if they were performing in their native language. Not sufficient proficiency in English of lecturers leads to a simplification of contents and materials and, in general, to a reduced quality of instruction.

=== In Japan ===
Scholars such as Ryuko Kubota have explored the subject of English in the Japanese education system. Major criticisms addressed the way textbooks for English-language teaching are designed. These tend to depict English-speaking societies (mostly associated with the United States and the United Kingdom) as problem-free, and this leads to notions of idealised societies where Japanese students may think there are no injustices, discrimination or social disharmony. According to Jacquelin Wildin these texts also assume that the West has ownership of critical thinking and that non-western countries are underdeveloped in their logic, critical and analytical skills. As underlined by the studies of Takehiko Nakata, this reinforces Japanese views of inferiority of non-westerners.

Other critics have argued that the dominance of English influences the Japanese language and people's views of language, culture, race, ethnicity and identity which are affected by the worldview of native English speakers; and that teaching English creates cultural and linguistic stereotypes not only of English but also of Japanese people. Recent discourses linked with the concepts of nihonjinron and kokusaika provide a broader context for understanding such ideologies. These discourses represent both resistance and accommodation to the hegemony of the West with a promotion of nationalistic values and learning a Western mode of communication, namely, English. Among several proposals offered by critics, raising critical awareness of English domination parallels the philosophy of critical pedagogy.

=== In Bangladesh ===
Critics of English-medium curricula point out that English-medium students are weak in their mother tongue (Bengali). They say that in English-medium schools, English is the first priority. They also argue that English-medium students are less patriotic. These days, schools in which English as their medium of instruction under Cambridge Assessment International Education, Pearson Edexcel and International Baccalaureate try their best to educate their students about their own culture. Also, the students are not taught the social studies courses which sometimes discusses about the social problems the government is dealing with.

=== In China ===
In China, English-language teaching has become increasingly important in the national scholastic system since university admission regulations changed in 2001. The value of the English-language component of the Gaokao became more important for the final evaluation than it was before. Moreover, English became an entry requirement for the most exclusive and desirable programs, such as business, law, sciences, technology. These decisions have had detrimental effects and have created many issues in the Chinese school system, due to the lack of English-language professors and appropriate funds. The starkest consequences are in the poorest parts of the country, as rural and minority languages areas. Nowadays, this educational disadvantage of minority students and students who come from the peripheral parts of China is widely discussed in China, as it is considered to diminish the possibility of social mobility instead of offering any development benefits.

== See also ==
- Bilingual education
- Welsh in education
- Western education
- Medium of instruction
- List of Irish medium primary schools in Northern Ireland

== Sources and further reading ==
- Séamas Ó Buachalla,Educational Policy and the Role of the Irish Language from 1831 to 1981, European Journal of Education, Vol. 19, No. 1, Multicultural Education (1984), pp. 75–92
- Bisong, Joseph (1995 [1994]) Language Choice and cultural Imperialism: a Nigerian Perspective. ELT Journal 49/2 pp. 122–132.
- Bobda, Augustin Simo (1997) Sociocultural Constraints in EFL Teaching in Cameroon. In: Pütz, Martin (ed.) The cultural Context in Foreign Language Teaching. Frankfurt a. M.: Lang. pp. 221–240.
- Breeze, Ruth and Sancho Guinda, Carmen (2021) Teaching English-Medium Instruction Courses in Higher Education: A Guide for Non-Native Speakers. London: Bloomsbury.
- Brutt-Griffler, Janina (2002) World English. Multilingual Matters. ISBN 1-85359-577-2
- Canagarajah, A. Suresh (1999), Resisting Linguistic Imperialism in English Teaching, Oxford University Press. ISBN 0-19-442154-6
- Canagarajah, A. Suresh, Thomas Ricento & Terrence G. Wiley [eds.] (2002) Journal of Language, Identity, and Education. Special issue. Lawrence Erlbaum Associates. ISBN 0-8058-9629-5
- Canagarajah, A. Suresh [ed.] (2004) Reclaiming the Local in Language Policy and Practice. Lawrence Erlbaum Associates. ISBN 0-8058-4593-3
- Crystal, David (2003), English as a Global Language, 2nd ed., Cambridge University Press. ISBN 0-521-53032-6
- Davies, Alan (1996) Review Article: ironising the Myth of Linguicism. Journal of Multilingual and Multicultural Development. 17/6: 485–596.
- Davies, Alan (1997) Response to a Reply. Journal of Multilingual and Multicultural Development 18/3 p. 248.
- Doiz, A., Lasabaster, D., & Sierra, J. M. (Eds.) (2013). English-medium instruction at universities: Global challenges. Bristol, England: Multilingual Matters. ISBN 978-1-84769-815-5
- Edge, Julian [ed.] (2006) (Re-)Locating TESOL in an Age of Empire. Palgrave Macmillan. ISBN 1-4039-8530-8
- Holborow, Marnie (1999) Politics of English. Sage Publications. ISBN 0-7619-6018-X
- Holborrow, Marnie (1993) Review Article: linguistic Imperialism. ELT Journal 47/4 pp. 358–360.
- Holliday, Adrian (2005), Struggle to Teach English as an International Language , Oxford University Press. ISBN 0-19-442184-8
- Kontra, Miklos, Robert Phillipson, Tove Skutnabb-Kangas & Tibor Varady [eds.] (1999), Language: A Right and a Resource, Central European University Press. ISBN 963-9116-64-5
- Kramsch, Klaire and Patricia Sullivan (1996) Appropriate Pedagogy. ELT Journal 50/3 pp. 199–212.
- Malik, S.A. Primary Stage English (1993). Lahore: Tario Brothers.
- Pennycook, Alastair (1995), The Cultural Politics of English as an International Language, Longman. ISBN 0-582-23473-5
- Pennycook, Alastair (1998), English and the Discourses of Colonialism, Routledge. ISBN 0-415-17848-7
- Pennycook, Alastair (2001), Critical Applied Linguistics, Lawrence Erlbaum Associates. ISBN 0-8058-3792-2
- Pennycook, Alastair (2007) Global Englishes and Transcultural Flows. Routledge. ISBN 0-415-37497-9
- Phillipson, Robert (1992), Linguistic Imperialism, Oxford University Press. ISBN 0-19-437146-8
- Phillipson, Robert [ed.] (2000), Rights to Language, Lawrence Erlbaum Associates. ISBN 0-8058-3835-X
- Phillipson, Robert (2003) English-Only Europe? Routledge. ISBN 0-415-28807-X
- Piller, Ingrid (2016), Linguistic Diversity and Social Justice. Oxford University Press.
- Punjab Text Book Board (1997) My English Book Step IV. Lahore: Metro Printers.
- Rajagopalan, Kanavilli (1999) Of EFL Teachers, Conscience and Cowardice. ELT Journal 53/3 200–206.
- Ramanathan, Vaidehi (2005) The English-Vernacular Divide. Multilingual Matters. ISBN 1-85359-769-4
- Rahman, Tariq (1996) Language and Politics in Pakistan Karachi: Oxford University Press
- Ricento, Thomas [ed.] (2000) Ideology, Politics, and Language Policies. John Benjamins. ISBN 1-55619-670-9
- Skutnabb-Kangas, Tove & Robert Phillipson [eds.]; Mart Rannut (1995), Linguistic Human Rights, Mouton De Gruyter. ISBN 3-11-014878-1
- Sonntag, Selma K. (2003) The Local Politics of Global English. Lexington Books. ISBN 0-7391-0598-1
- Spichtinger, Daniel (2000) The Spread of English and its Appropriation. University of Vienna, Vienna.
- Tsui, Amy B.M. & James W. Tollefson (in press) Language Policy, Culture, and Identity in Asian Contexts. Lawrence Erlbaum Associates. ISBN 0-8058-5694-3
- Widdowson, H.G. (1998a) EIL: squaring the Circles. A Reply. World Englishes 17/3 pp. 397–401.
- Widdowson, H.G. (1998b) The Theory and Practice of Critical Discourse Analysis. Applied Linguistics 19/1 pp. 136–151.
