= Yuen Long =

Town in Hong Kong

Coordinates: 22°26′40″N 114°01′33″E

- Chinese: 元朗
Transcriptions
Standard Mandarin
- Hanyu Pinyin: Yuánlǎng
Yue: Cantonese
- Yale Romanization: Yùhn Lóhng
- Jyutping: jyun4 long5

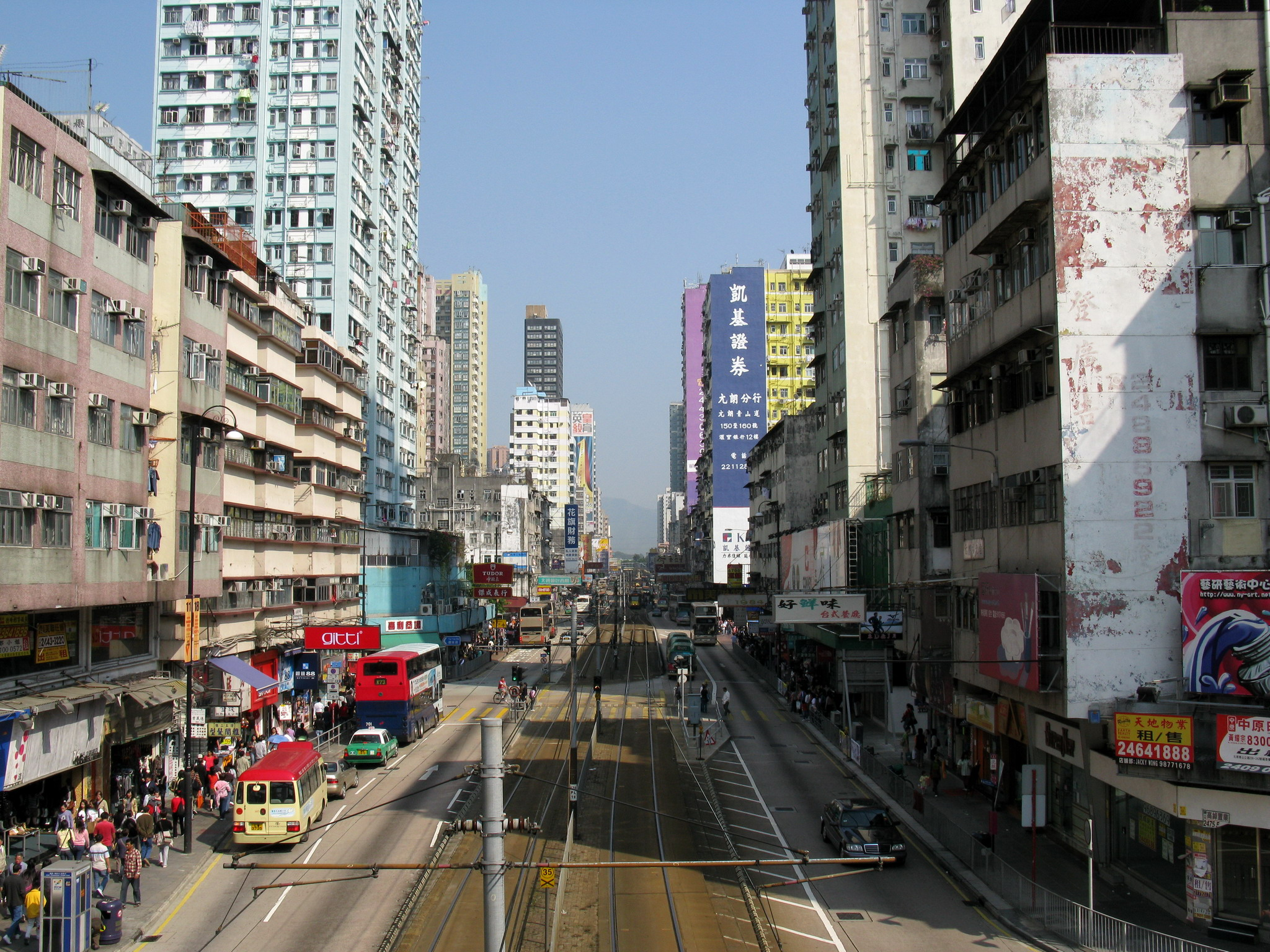
Castle Peak Road is the major road in Yuen Long Town

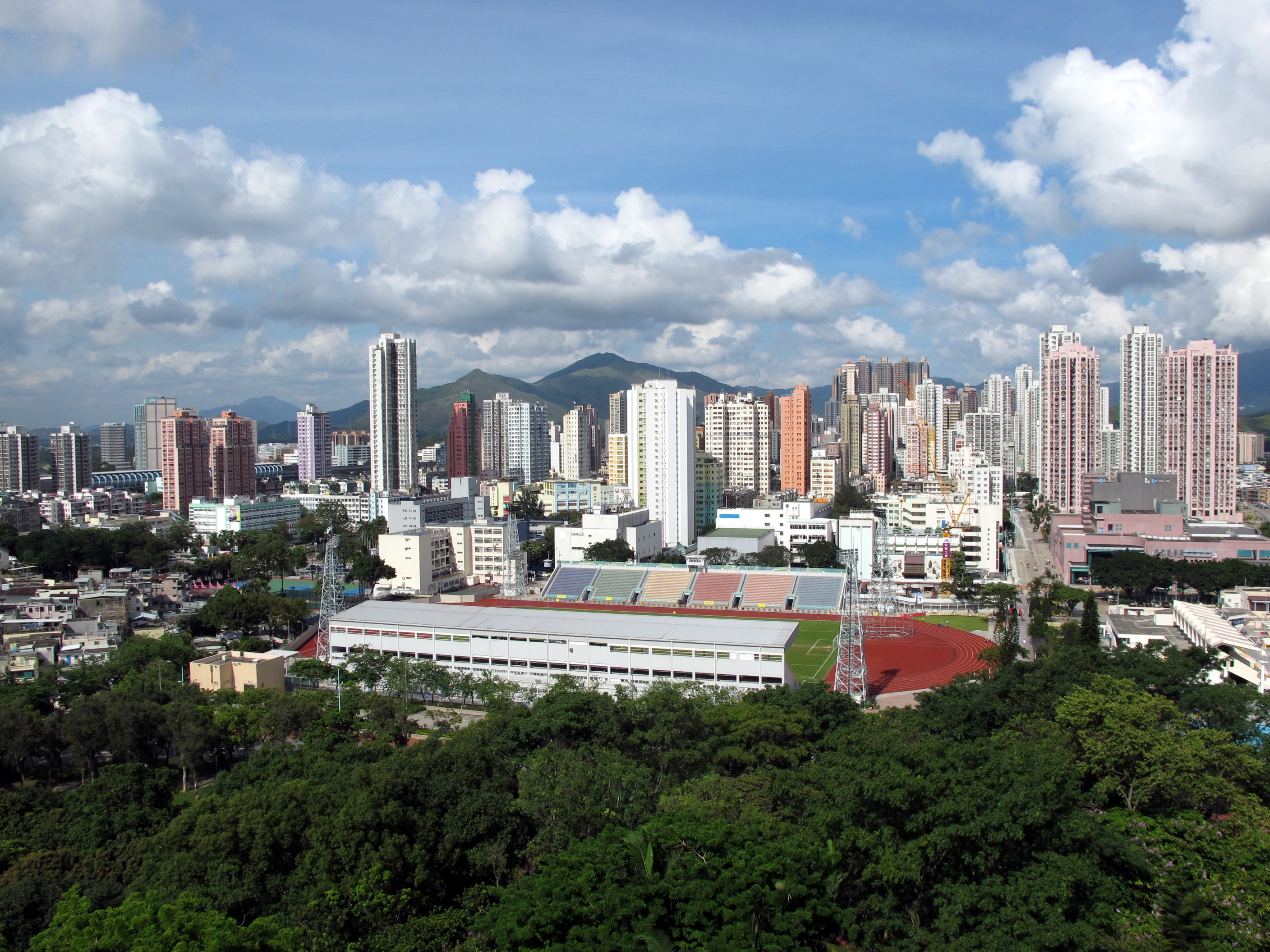
Skyline of Yuen Long Town

Yuen Long is a town in the western north New Territories, Hong Kong. To its west lie Hung Shui Kiu (洪水橋), Tin Shui Wai, Lau Fau Shan and Ha Tsuen, to the south Shap Pat Heung and Tai Tong, to the east Au Tau and Kam Tin (錦田), and to the north Nam Sang Wai.

== Name ==
According to Gazetteer of Xin'an County (新安縣志) and other ancient maps, Yuen Long was first written as 圓蓢 (jyun4 long5), lit. 'Round Basin or Round lowland'). Yuen Long refers to a large plain surrounded by a series of hills, starting from Oyster Hill (蠔殼山) in Ou Tau (凹頭) on the east and ending at Tai Tau Shan (大頭山) in Tuen Mun on the west, which is like a basin.

Yuen Long is in the Shan Pui River Basin (山貝河流域). From the literal meaning, it can be inferred that Yuen Long was a swampy lowland with abundant water resources in ancient times.

The Cantonese name Yuen Long may refer to the limits of the original market town, Yuen Long New Town, Yuen Long Plain or Yuen Long District.

== Market town ==
The central part of Yuen Long was traditionally a market town, in the area now known as Yuen Long San Hui (元朗新墟), in Yuen Long District, where people from the surrounding villages sold their crops and fish. The market is still a place where people from villages in the northwest New Territories shop and trade. Like many market towns in Hong Kong, the market operates only on certain days each week. Modern shopping malls and restaurants have also established.

== New towns ==
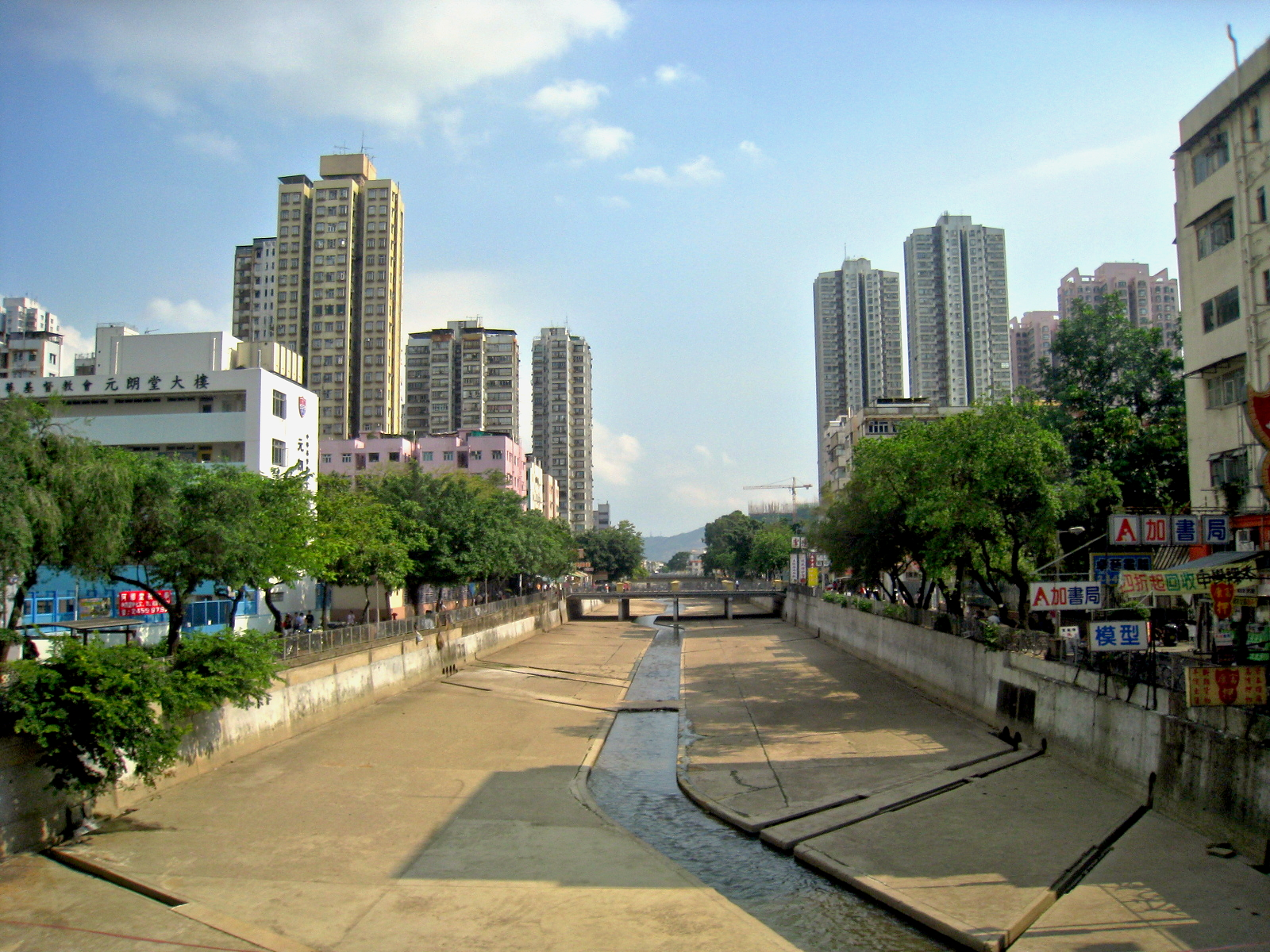
Shan Pui River passing through Yuen Long Town

Two new towns have been developed in Yuen Long since the 1970s:

Yuen Long New Town was developed in and around the market town in the late 1970s and early 1980s.

Tin Shui Wai New Town was established in the 1990s to the west of Yuen Long New Town, separate from Yuen Long New Town. It is mostly residential.

There are Light Rail Transit and several bus routes serving between the two towns.

== History ==
The earliest market in Yuen Long was south of the main road, near Tai Kei Leng. In 1669, the market was moved north to the area near the present-day Yuen Long station. This area is now known as Yuen Long Kau Hui (元朗舊墟, lit. "old Yuen Long Town"). This market is sited south of a small hill. While it is far from the coast today, it was beside the seashore when the market was first built.

Cheung Shing Street, which separates Nam Pin Wai and Sai Pin Wai, divides the centre of the market. Temples were built for worship and to judge disputes. After the British leased the New Territories in 1898, they built Castle Peak Road to connect major areas of the New Territories and Kowloon. The villagers proposed and moved the market town to the main road. After the Second World War, Yuen Long Town dramatically increased in size, going from a small village into a large town known for its numerous cultural and sporting events.

=== 2019 Yuen Long attack ===
The 2019 Yuen Long attack was a mob attack that occurred on 21 July 2019, in Yuen Long, Hong Kong. A mob of over 100 armed men dressed in white indiscriminately attacked civilians on the streets and passengers in the Yuen Long MTR station including the elderly, children, black-clad protesters, journalists and lawmakers. At least 45 people were injured in the incident, including a pregnant woman. The attack happened following an anti-extradition bill protest in Sheung Wan, Hong Kong and was an act perpetrated against the pro-democracy protesters.

== Cross-border activities ==
Due to their proximity to the Shenzhen border in China's Guangdong province, towns in the northern parts of Hong Kong, notably Sheung Shui and Yuen Long, have become hubs for parallel traders who have been buying up large quantities of goods, forcing up local prices and disrupting the daily lives of local citizens. Since 2012, there has been a vertiginous increase in Chinese parallel traders arriving in the North District of Hong Kong to re-export infant formula and household products – goods popular with the Chinese – across the border to Shenzhen. Trafficking caused chronic local shortages of milk powder in Hong Kong, which led the government to impose restrictions on the amount of milk powder exports from Hong Kong.

The first anti-parallel trading protest was started at Sheung Shui in September 2012. As government efforts to limit the adverse impact of Chinese trafficking were widely seen as inadequate, there have been further subsequent protests in towns in the North District including Sheung Shui. A campaign called Liberate Yuen Long was mounted on 1 March 2015 by localist camp to protest smuggling and parallel trading.

== Demographics ==
Yuen Long residents are mainly local ethnic Han with a sizable Hoa immigrants, Vietnamese Chinese from the 1970s to 1990s.

== Housing estate ==
The private residential estate Fairview Park is in the northeast part of Yuen Long.

The largest residential estate in Yuen Long is the YOHO complex, including THE YOHO HUB II (located at 1 Long Lok Road, Yuen Long Station), Grand YOHO (9 Long Yat Road, Yuen Long Station), and YOHO Town (8 Yuen Lung Street).

== Education ==
The Yuen Long West area, meaning areas west of Tai Tong Road and the Yuen Long Nullah and south of Kau Yuk Road, is in Primary One Admission (POA) School Net 73. The other parts are in POA 74.

Within POA 73 are multiple aided schools (operated independently but funded with government money) and one government school: South Yuen Long Government Primary School (南元朗官立小學). POA 74 has multiple aided schools and one government school: Yuen Long Government Primary School (元朗官立小學).

Schools in Yuen Long include:

- Yuen Long Merchants Association Secondary School
- Yuen Long Public Secondary School
- N.T. Heung Yee Kuk Yuen Long District Secondary School
- Yuen Long Catholic Secondary School
- ELCHK Yuen Long Lutheran Secondary School
- CCC Kei Yuen College

The Yuen Kong Kindergarten is in Yuen Kong Tsuen. It had five students in 2009 and 64 students in 2011; Elaine Yau of the South China Morning Post stated that the school had faced closure but has since improved. The film Little Big Master is about the kindergarten.

Hong Kong Public Libraries operates the Yuen Long Public Library in the Yuen Long Leisure & Cultural Building.

== In popular culture ==
The 2003 Hong Kong drama Vigilante Force by TVB starring Bowie Lam is set in Yuen Long. The school in 2020 Hong Kong drama We are the Littles by ViuTV starring Stephy Tang, Zeno Koo, Ian Chan and Anson Lo is in Yuen Long. The same school is also appeared in the 2022 Hong Kong drama Into the Wild by ViuTV starring Stanley Yau.

== Climate ==
Climate data for Yuen Long (Hong Kong Wetland Park), (2006–2020)
Month	Jan	Feb	Mar	Apr	May	Jun	Jul	Aug	Sep	Oct	Nov	Dec	Year
Record high °C (°F)	30.4 (86.7)	30.7 (87.3)	32.7 (90.9)	35.9 (96.6)	37.4 (99.3)	36.1 (97.0)	38.3 (100.9)	39.0 (102.2)	36.3 (97.3)	36.0 (96.8)	33.0 (91.4)	32.8 (91.0)	39.0 (102.2)
Mean daily maximum °C (°F)	20.0 (68.0)	21.3 (70.3)	23.5 (74.3)	26.6 (79.9)	30.0 (86.0)	31.6 (88.9)	32.7 (90.9)	32.6 (90.7)	32.1 (89.8)	29.8 (85.6)	26.0 (78.8)	21.6 (70.9)	27.3 (81.2)
Daily mean °C (°F)	15.6 (60.1)	17.1 (62.8)	19.7 (67.5)	22.9 (73.2)	26.4 (79.5)	28.3 (82.9)	28.9 (84.0)	28.6 (83.5)	27.8 (82.0)	25.4 (77.7)	21.7 (71.1)	17.1 (62.8)	23.3 (73.9)
Mean daily minimum °C (°F)	12.3 (54.1)	14.1 (57.4)	16.8 (62.2)	20.0 (68.0)	23.6 (74.5)	25.7 (78.3)	26.1 (79.0)	25.7 (78.3)	24.8 (76.6)	22.3 (72.1)	18.5 (65.3)	13.7 (56.7)	20.3 (68.5)
Record low °C (°F)	2.2 (36.0)	4.5 (40.1)	6.7 (44.1)	11.5 (52.7)	16.3 (61.3)	19.9 (67.8)	23.0 (73.4)	22.9 (73.2)	19.8 (67.6)	14.2 (57.6)	8.1 (46.6)	3.1 (37.6)	2.2 (36.0)
Average precipitation mm (inches)	40.4 (1.59)	32.4 (1.28)	67.1 (2.64)	128.3 (5.05)	240.9 (9.48)	303.7 (11.96)	252.1 (9.93)	313.7 (12.35)	195.7 (7.70)	66.9 (2.63)	40.7 (1.60)	21.3 (0.84)	1,703.2 (67.05)
Average relative humidity (%)	72.5	76.2	78.4	80.5	81.6	83.2	81.7	83.0	80.3	74.0	73.9	69.1	77.9
Source: Hong Kong Observatory

== Public transport ==
The following information show transportation in Yuen Long.

=== Inside Yuen Long Town ===
==== Buses ====
- KMB routes 53, 54, 64K, 68A, 68E, 68F, 68M, 68R, 68X, 76K, 77K, 264R, 268A, 268B, 268C, 268P, 268X, 269D, 276, 276P, 869, 968, 968A, 968X, B1, N269, N368, R968
  - Route B1 to Lok Ma Chau station Control Point, a customs checkpoint between Hong Kong and China
- MTR Bus routes K65, K66, K68, K73, K74
- Long Win Bus routes A36, E36, E36A, N30, NA36
- New Lantao Bus route B2
  - Route B2 to Shenzhen Bay Port, a customs checkpoint between Hong Kong and mainland China

==== Rail ====
- MTR Tuen Ma line (Long Ping station/Yuen Long station)
- Light Rail routes 610, 614, 615 and 761P

=== Outside Yuen Long Town (except via Yuen Long Town) ===
==== Buses ====
- KMB routes 51, 64S, 69C, 69M, 69P, 69X, 251A, 251B, 251M, 265B, 265M, 265S, 269A, 269B, 269C, 269M, 269P, 276A, 276B
- MTR Bus routes K75, K75A, K75P
- Long Win Bus routes A37, E36P, E37, NA37
- New Lantao Bus routes B2P, B2X
  - Routes B2P and B2X to Shenzhen Bay Port, a customs checkpoint between Hong Kong and mainland China
- Citybus routes 967, 967X, 969, 969A, 969B, 969C, 969P, 969X, N969

==== Rail ====
- MTR Tuen Ma line
- Light Rail routes 705, 706 and 751
