= Bishop Hall Jubilee School =

Coordinates: 22°19′47.0″N 114°10′51.08″E

Bishop Hall Jubilee School Chinese: 何明華會督銀禧中學
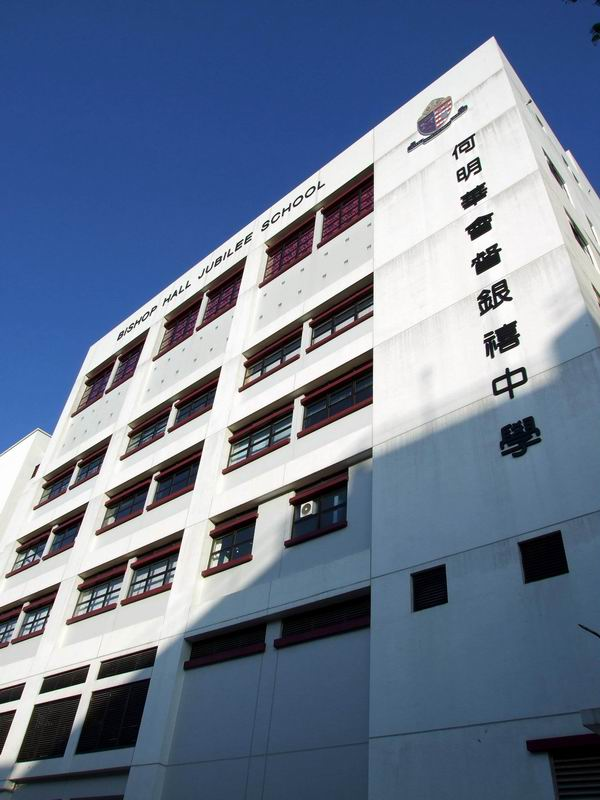
- Bishop Hall Jubilee School
- 2C, Oxford Road, Kowloon; Hong Kong

Information
- Type: Grant School
- Motto: Non nascor mihi solum (I am not born for myself alone)
- Established: 1961
- School district: Kowloon City
- Principal: Ms Law King Yuk Vicky
- Chaplain: The Very Revd. Franklin Lee On Yip
- Staff: 95
- Grades: F1 - F6
- Enrollment: 850
- Colours: Blue, white and grey
- Affiliation: Hong Kong Sheng Kung Hui
- Website: www.bhjs.edu.hk

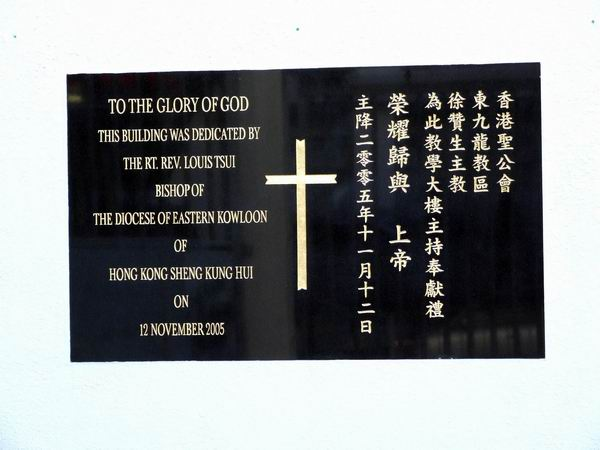
Bishop Hall Jubilee School stone

Bishop Hall Jubilee School (BHJS; Chinese: 何明華會督銀禧中學) is a co-educational secondary school located at 2C Oxford Road in Kowloon Tong, Kowloon, Hong Kong. The school is ran as a grant school. The school uses English as the medium of instruction.

== History ==
The school was established in 1961 to commemorate the Silver Jubilee of Ronald Hall, who was Anglican Bishop of Victoria from 1932 to 1951 and Bishop of the Diocese of Hong Kong and Macao from 1951 to 1966. The school first used the campus of Heep Yunn School, relocating in 1962 to its present address in Oxford Road, Kowloon Tong.

The year 2026 marks the 65th anniversary of the school, featuring events and activities through this academic year.

The school has had six principals:

Year	Chinese name	English name
1961–1973	黃徐仲霞女士	Helen Wong
1973–2001	陳志欽先生	Chan Chee Yum
2001–2010	郭始基先生	Peter Kwok
2010–2012	彭淑美女士	Dorothy Pang Shuk Mei
2013–2022	王莉莉女士	Wong Lee Lee
2022–Present	羅敬玉女士	Law King Yuk Vicky

== Sister School Scheme ==
- Mary Rose School
