= Marnie Holborow =

Marnie Holborow is Associate Faculty at Dublin City University. She is the author of two books on Marxism and language, The Politics of English (1999) and Language and Neoliberalism (2015). She has written articles on the home, women and paid employment and on the 2018 movement in Ireland for abortion rights, in which she was a leading activist. Her most recent book in this area is Homes in Crisis Capitalism (2024). She lives in Dublin, Ireland and is an activist of the political party People Before Profit and of the Socialist Workers Network.

== Published works ==
- The Politics of English. A Marxist View of Language. By Marnie Holborow. Sage Publications, 1999. ISBN 0-7619-6017-1.
- Neoliberalism and Applied Linguistics. By David Block, John Gray and Marnie Holborow. Routledge, 2012. ISBN 978-0-415-59204-8.
- Language and Neoliberalism. By Marnie Holborow. Routledge, 2015. ISBN 978-0-415-74455-3.
- Homes in Crisis Capitalism: Gender, work and revolution. By Marnie Holborow. Bloomsbury, 2024. ISBN 978-1-350-37996-1.
