= Yuen Long Public Secondary School =

Secondary school in Yuen Long, Hong Kong

Coordinates: 22°26′25″N 114°01′05″E

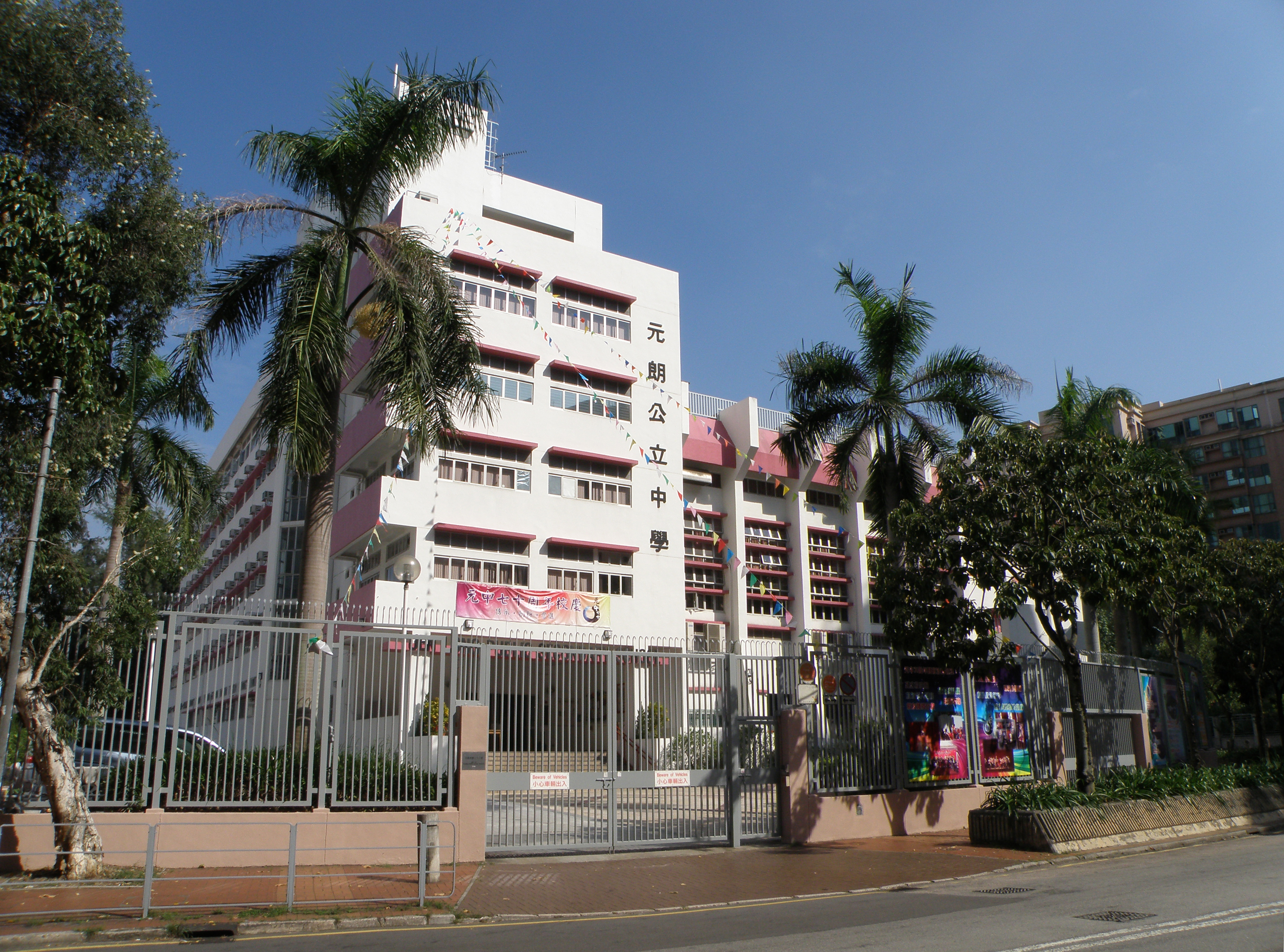
- 22 Town Park Road South, Yuen Long, N.T.

Information
- Other name: Yuen Long Public Secondary School
- Motto: Viavirtutis Sapientia
- Established: 1945; 81 years ago
- School district: Yuen Long
- Houses: Yuen, Long, Middle, School
- Affiliation: Hong Kong Government
- Website: ylpss.edu.hk

Yuen Long Public Secondary School
- Traditional Chinese: 元朗公立中學
- Simplified Chinese: 元朗公立中学
Transcriptions
Standard Mandarin
- Hanyu Pinyin: Yuán Lǎng Gōnglì Zhōngxué
Yue: Cantonese
- Jyutping: jyun4 long5 gung1 laap6 zung1 hok6

Yuen Long Public Secondary School is a school located in Yuen Long. In 1936, community members of Yuen Long felt that all primary school pupils in the district could not continue with secondary schooling. Seeing this, local community leaders initiated the establishment of a secondary school for the local students which led to fund-raising campaigns over a ten-year period.

== History ==
In 1946, the school was the first secondary school established by the Government in the New Territories. The school moved into the campus at Au Tau in 1949 and moved again in 1989 to the present modern campus in Town Park Road South, Yuen Long. The School Improvement Programme, scheduled for expansion with a total floor area of 1030 square metres, was completed in September 2003. The new annex was officially opened on 30 October 2003.

As early as the 1930s, there were no government or aided secondary schools established in the New Territories. There were only a few private secondary schools. Most students had to travel to Kowloon or Hong Kong Island to enter secondary schools. Therefore, the squires of Yuen Long began to raise funds for construction in 1936. The middle school, Yuen Long Public Middle School was completed in 1946.

Because the Yuen Long Public High School was originally built by the squires of Yuen Long and raised about 100,000 funds. At that time, the Education Department had the enthusiasm of the squires, and also injected about 100,000. The squires saw the support of the government, so they learned about the management rights.

As for the government, the government also thanked the squires for giving back to the society, so it named the school "Yuen Long Public Secondary School" instead of "Yuen Long Government Secondary School" and became the only "government secondary school" named "Public". The lyrics of the school song are also Yun: “The gov’ment at the helm. It’s pub-lic trait shows its goal”

At first, Yuan zhong school was established in Au tou, and then moved to the current site next to Yuen Long Park in Buffalo Ridge in 1989. The expansion project was completed in 2003. [1] The original site of Autou is now the Ma Zhen yu Memorial Middle School of the Tung Wah Group of Hospitals.
