= Internationalization of higher education =

Internationalization of higher education in theory is "the process of integrating an international, intercultural, or global dimension into the purpose, functions or delivery of postsecondary education." Internationalization of higher education in practice is "the process of commercializing research and postsecondary education, and international competition for the recruitment of foreign students from wealthy and privileged countries in order to generate revenue, secure national profile, and build international reputation." The main components of internationalization of higher education are recruitment of international students, development of international branch campuses, students, staff and scholars exchange programs, internationalization of the curriculum, and research and education partnerships between institutions regionally and internationally.

There are specific rationales which are driving the internationalisation and strategies which are being used in the internationalisation of the high education institutions (HEIs).

== Internationalization rationales ==
There are three rationales of internationalization: idealism, instrumentalism and educationalism.

=== Idealism ===
An idealist rationale of internationalization in higher education can generate a more democratic, fair and equal world with regard to international cooperation.

=== Instrumentalism ===
The second rationale is consistent with its practical and economic goals. This rationale influences policy-makers on developing the level of transparency and mobilization between national educational systems, enabling and simplifying the mobility of people and integrating university degrees, grading systems etc. According to instrumentalists, higher education is a way of increasing profit, ensuring economic boost and sustainable development and transferring ideologies of governments, transnational corporations, stakeholders or supranational regimes.

Furthermore, higher education is required to meet the demands of the capitalist and global world. In this respect, universities espousing internationalization are more likely to promote their country's competitiveness in the global academic arena. Instrumentalism can be contrasted with idealism in terms of hidden ideocultural goals.

=== Educationalism ===
Educationalists accept internationalization in higher education (HE) as a way of broadening the academic experiences of students and academic staff.

== Internationalization preparedness ==
Preparedness for internationalization of higher education can be understood better at two levels; organizational and systemic. Organizational preparedness includes structural preparedness, functional and administrative preparedness, academic preparedness and cultural preparedness. Systemic preparedness is about political will and support to internationalization, economic and financial support by the state, administrative and regulatory mechanism that is conducive for globalized outlook and importantly, social structures that enable.

== Internationalization strategies ==
=== Academic strategies ===
Academic strategies focus on academic programmes, research and scholarly collaboration, external relations: domestic and cross-border and extra-curricular activities.

=== Organizational strategies ===
Organisational strategies include governance, operations, services and human resources. Governance mainly focuses on the active participation of faculty and staff, recognition of the international dimension in institutional mission/mandate statements and in planning, management. Additionally, it indicates the importance of operations which highlights appropriate organizational structures, systems for coordination, communication and cooperation, adequate financial support and resource allocation systems.

== Internationalization categories ==
The internationalization of higher education can be divided into two processes:

=== Internationalization at home ===
As a response to domestic postsecondary students lacking opportunities with cross cultural experiences, schools have developed on campus internationalization efforts to promote a global student identity. Examples of on-campus cultural learning opportunities include: internationalizing the curriculum, developing inter-cultural research projects, collaborating with local minority groups, and promoting interactions amongst domestic and international students. Examples of good practice in this area are now also widely available.

=== Crossborder internationalization ===
Crossborder internationalization is "the movement of people, programs, providers, policies, knowledge, ideas, projects and services across national boundaries." Traditionally, crossborder internationalization was demonstrated through student mobility, but now postsecondary institutions are borrowing and implementing foreign programs within their own campus. This demonstrates how internationalization efforts involve the exchange of both people and ideas to new countries.

== Impacts of internationalization ==
=== Economic impacts ===
Considered to be a product of and response to globalization, internationalization has an economic orientation. Within the Anglo-American tradition of higher education, internationalization is increasingly associated with commodification and commercialization of postsecondary education. There is international competition for recruitment amongst postsecondary institutions to recruit foreign students from privileged countries in order to generate revenue, secure national profile, and build international reputation. Anglophone postsecondary institutions benefit from international students enrolling at their school due to the higher tuition fees for foreign students. International students contribute to their host country's economy through their tuition fees and their living costs during their study period.

=== Social impacts ===
Postsecondary institutions promote interactions between international and domestic students to develop their cultural fluency skills in preparation for a globalized future. The rise of internationalization has meant students from countries with limited access to domestic higher education opportunities are able to access and obtain their education in a foreign country. Postsecondary institutions that offer internationalization experiences, whether crossborder or within their own campus, are viewed as more prestigious and competitive than schools who have limited international mobility initiatives.

The emergence of concepts as internationalization of educational policies, students-staff exchange programs, internationalization of curriculum, internationalization at home (IAH) or even the emergence of multinational agencies to expedite global exchanges in the realm of Higher Education lead educational policy-makers to confess that segregation of the educational policies from nations’ foreign affairs policies have no promising results than failure of the nations’ educational goals and priorities.

=== Academic impacts ===
The rise of international students at postsecondary institutions has led to faculty adapting their teaching style and content delivery to better fit diverse student needs, especially language gaps, within the classroom. These academic modifications include providing diversity focused materials, promoting cross cultural collaboration in class, avoiding colloquial language, and presenting images/visual material to support lecture content.

== Challenges of internationalization ==
The internationalization of higher education can pose several challenges:

- Western postsecondary institutions have been tasked with developing culturally relevant support services for the rising diverse international student population.
- Cross cultural research projects and research collaborations can be difficult when language barriers are present between the countries working together.
- At the institutional level, internationalization efforts can be hindered when senior staff do not reach a consensus about the definition of internationalization and the steps needed to undertake the process.
- International students pay inflated tuition fees when compared to domestic students in some countries, such as the UK, which can act as a barrier for international study opportunities.
- The popularity of internationalizing higher education has led to the creation of private and non-accredited education companies offering unregulated courses and programs.

== Influential programs ==
Similarities – in systems or even in ideas – that schools share internationally have led to an increase in international student exchanges. The European Socrates-Erasmus Programme facilitates exchanges across European universities. The Soros Foundation provides many opportunities for students from central Asia and eastern Europe. Programs such as the International Baccalaureate have contributed to the internationalization of education. The global campus online, led by American universities, allows free access to class materials and lecture files recorded during the actual classes.

The Programme for International Student Assessment and the International Association for the Evaluation of Educational Achievement objectively monitor and compare the proficiency of students from a wide range of different nations.
