= Y.W.C.A. Hioe Tjo Yoeng College =

School in Hong Kong

The Y.M.C.A. Hioe Tjo Yoeng College
- 基督教女青年會丘佐榮中學
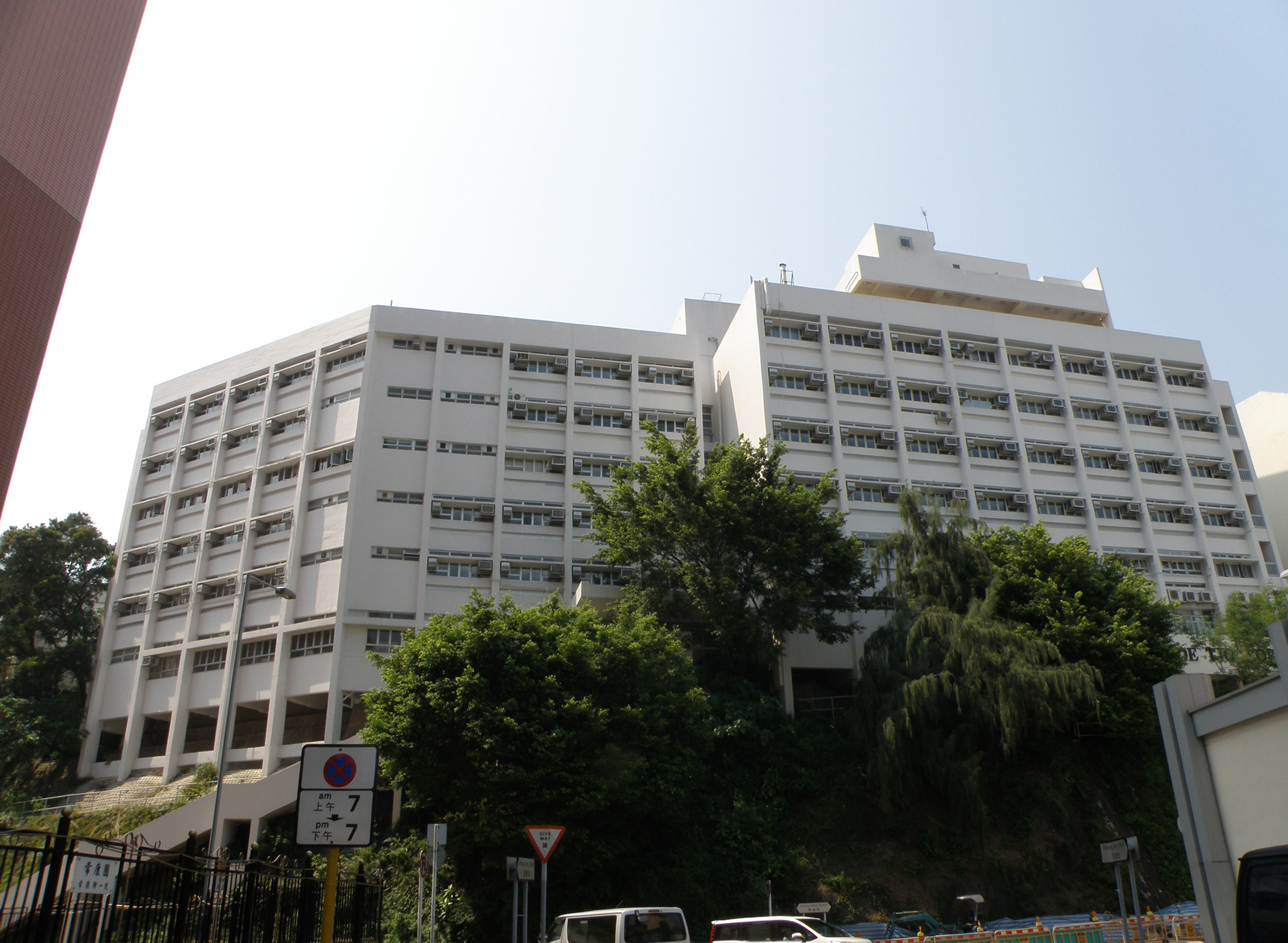
- The Y.W.C.A. Hioe Tjo Yoeng College

Location
- 6 Sheung Wo Street; Ho Man Tin; Kowloon; Hong Kong
- Coordinates: 22.3198°N 114.1831°E

Information
- Type: Grant, grammar, secondary, co-educational
- Motto: Think critically and be moral
- Religious affiliation: Christian
- Established: 1971
- Chairperson: Ms LUI San Man Simmy
- Principal: Mr KWOK Sai-man
- Teaching staff: ~58
- Secondary years taught: Secondary 1 - Secondary 6
- Enrollment: ~700
- Houses: Faith, Hope, Love & Grace
- Publication: 點滴（中文）、Sparks（英文）
- Website: http://www.htyc.edu.hk http://www.htycva.com (Visual Arts)
- Last updated: 10 SEP 2025

The Y.W.C.A. Hioe Tjo Yoeng College (HTYC; Chinese: 基督教女青年會丘佐榮中學) is a Hong Kong secondary school. A coeducational school subsidised by the government, it is in the Ho Man Tin, a residential area in Kowloon, Hong Kong. Established in 1971, HTYC is run under the sponsorship YWCA and was founded with a donation from Hioe Tjo Yoeng and his wife.

== History ==
The Y.W.C.A. Hioe Tjo Yoeng College (HTYC) is at 6 Sheung Wo Street in Ho Man Tin, a residential area in Kowloon, Hong Kong. Lady Black, the wife of Hong Kong colonial administrator Robert Black, put down the cornerstone signifying the start of construction on 15 October 1963. Lady Black stated at the ceremony, "As Patron of the Hongkong Chinese Women's Club, I am delighted to be here today to lay the foundation stone for the school, for which the members of the Club have worked so hard to show, in a positive way, their willingness to help the less fortunate people in this Colony. This school, when it is completed, will be a symbol of cooperation between all members of the varied community of Hongkong." When construction began, the school was estimated to cost $500,000 to build. After construction was completed, the total construction cost was $2.5 million. Hioe Tjo Yoeng and his wife donated $500,000 to construct the school and $20,000 for school supplies, while the government covered 80% of the construction expenses.

HTYC, a coeducational secondary, became the first school operated by YWCA to be government subsidised. The school had an opening ceremony on 26 January 1972 that was presided over by John Canning, Hong Kong's Director of Education. Ellen Li, who was serving as a Legislative Council of Hong Kong Unofficial Member, became the school's supervisor when it opened. Although HTYC could enrol up to 700 students, it had enrolled 249 students by January 1972 who would attend six Form I and II classes. When the first classes were held in September 1972, there were 280 enrolled students.

HTYC began enroling students in form five in 1974 and started offering A-level courses in 1976. The school in 1985 had classes from form one to form seven. That year, it had 700 students, 33 instructors, and 19 classes. Kwok Sai-man (Chinese: 郭世民), an HTYC alumnus, became its principal in 2021.

== See also ==
- Education in Hong Kong
- List of schools in Hong Kong
