= Hong Kong Inter-School Athletics Competition =

The Hong Kong Inter-School Athletics Competition, held by the Hong Kong Schools Sports Federation annually, aims to explore young talents in track and field events, to raise standards of such competitions to an international level, and to control the selection of Hong Kong representation at interport, Asian and World Competition. In order to accommodate the huge number of 245 participating schools each year, the competition is categorized into three divisions by region. There is a total of six groups: Division one, Division two and Division three (Area1- Area4), competing in 18 events in their regions separately.

== History ==
The Hong Kong Inter-School Athletics Competition was founded in the 1950s, and has become one of the leading athletics competitions in Hong Kong. Since 1 September 1997, it has been organized by the Hong Kong School Sports Federation (HKSSF), a unification of the three unincorporated associations namely Hong Kong Schools Sports Council, Hong Kong School Sports Association and New Territories Schools Sports Association. After that, the competition is held on a yearly basis, mostly in the midst of February to early March, with the Wan Chai Sports Ground being the sole venue.

== Events ==
There are 18 events in the competition, including 10 track events, 6 field events and 2 relay events, all events will be held in accordance with the competition rules of the Hong Kong Amateur Athletics Association as per IAAF unless otherwise specified.

Track events	Field events	Relay events
100m	High Jump	4 × 100 m Relay
200m	Long Jump	4 × 400 m Relay
400m	Triple Jump ( only eligible to Boys A&B grade )	
800m	Shot Put	
1500m	Discus	
3000m ( only eligible to Boys B grade )	Javelin	
5000m ( only eligible to Boys A grade )		
100m Hurdles ( Boys A grade excluded )		
110m Hurdles ( only eligible to Boys A grade )		
400m Hurdles ( only eligible to Boys B grade )		

== General Rules ==
In order to safeguard the authenticity and integrity of Athletics and the fairness of the competition, all athletes should adopt the following rules and procedures set out by the Federation.

=== Uniform Policy ===
An eligible team suit must have their school name or school badge clearly printed. Athletes should wear their team suits with the same colour and pattern in relay events or else they may be disqualified.

=== Identification ===
Students must possess their own registration card in order to compete, on which basic information like Chinese and English full name, gender, birthday, school of representation and a recent photo of the student must be included. Students can only represent the school at which they study.

=== Entries ===
Each school may enter TWO competitors in each event and ONE team in each of the relay races. Each competitor may enter TWO individual events and ONE relay race.

=== Punishment Mechanism ===
When mistakes are made by student athletes and member schools due to negligence and illegality, the results of relevant matches will be invalidated and warnings will be issued to the related schools. Punishments can involve disqualifications or suspensions for 2 to 3 years, depending on the severity of mistakes made.

=== Promotion and Relegation System ===
For Division one, the last 2 schools in each of the Boys and Girls categories will be relegated to Division two and vice versa. While for Division two, the last 4 schools in each of the Boys and Girls categories will be relegated to Division three and the top 2 schools in each of the Boys and Girls categories in Division three will be promoted to Division two.

== Outstanding Results and Athletes ==
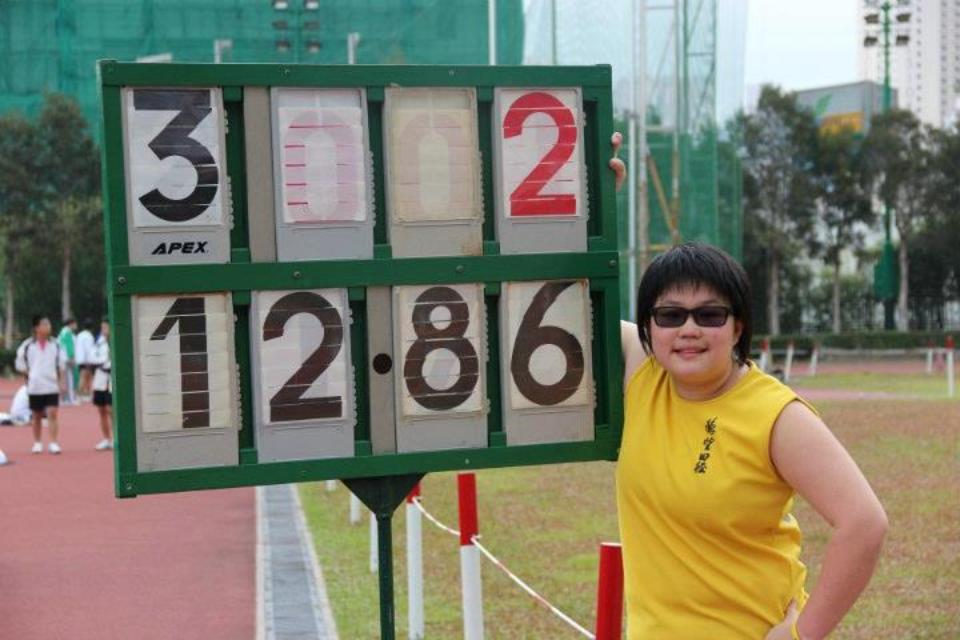
Ho's record breaking performance of 12.86m in the Girls A grade Shot put Event in 2012

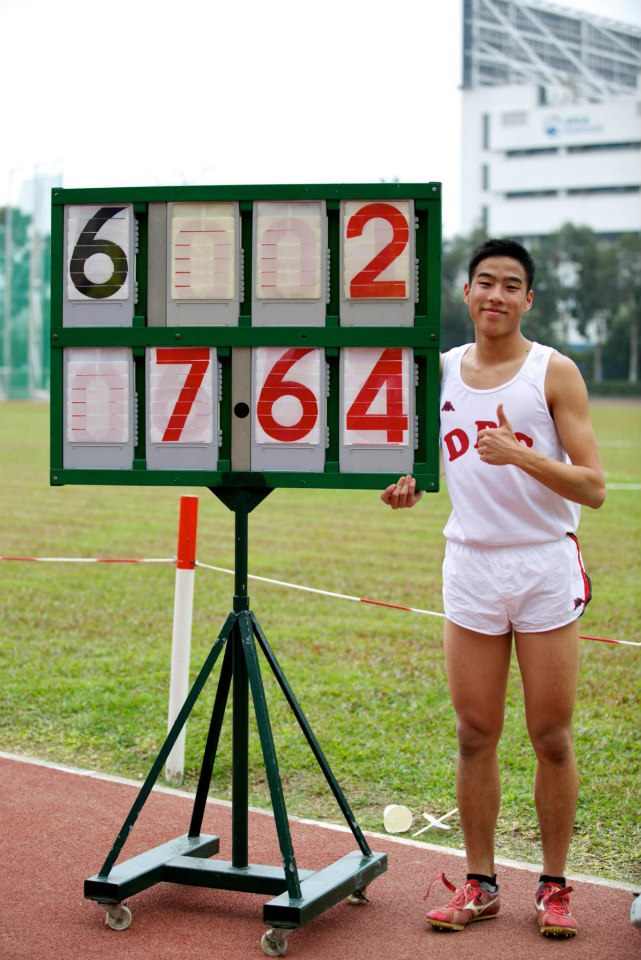
Chan's record breaking performance of 7.64m in the Boys A grade Long Jump event in 2013.

In 2012, Ho Yin Chiu from Good Hope School achieved an outstanding results of 12.86m in the A grade Shot Put event, concurrently breaking the Interschool Record, the Hong Kong Junior Record as well as the Hong Kong Record, of which the Hong Kong Record had remained unchallenged for over 37 years. She became the first person breaking a Hong Kong record in an Interschool competition.

In 2013, Chan Ming Tai from Diocesan Boys' School came out with the same achievement as Ho's, breaking the Hong Kong Record of men's Long Jump with a result of 7.64m, surpassed the former record of 7.49m which had been retained for more than 27 years. Chan's performance has made him the first male athlete breaking a Hong Kong Record in an Interschool competition.

== TV on the Spot Coverage ==
The competition has become increasingly popular in recent years, in particular, the Division One Competition. From 2014 onwards, Now TV has marked the Division one Inter-School Athletics Competition as a yearly program in their channel 630 Now TV Prime Sport, on which the Final Day of the competition is broadcast live. Audiences can track the events on TV in detail. Also, there would be an on the spot commentator navigating the competition and holding instant interviews with the winners.
