= Native-speakerism =

Ideology in language teaching

Native-speakerism is the belief that native-speaker teachers embody Western cultural ideals in both English language and teaching methodology. The term was coined by Adrian Holliday. However, the ideology of native-speakerism has been present much longer than that. Native-speakerism often stems from the dichotomous view that native language acquisition is ideal, while foreign language acquisition is inferior. This belief can be seen in the persistent preference for language teachers who are 'native speakers' of that language.

== History and background ==
In second language acquisition, native-speakerism developed quickly following the end of the Second World War and the beginning of the scientific period of language learning. This period saw the implementation of standards in grammar and vocabulary, which is the foundation of the favouritism given towards native-speakers in the second language learning and teaching environment. During this period post World War II, the Chomskian notion of the monolingual, idealised, native speaker was developed. As a result, the idealisation of native-speakers as the bearers of correct language has led to the ideal language teacher as also being a native-speaker.

== Criticisms ==
The native-speaker ideal for language teachers is a fallacy, as native-speaker teachers are not linguistically and instructionally superior compared to non-native speaking teachers. The native-speakerism ideology is described as "a distorted world view" by Holliday, and by labelling teachers as native or non-native it falsely positions them as inferior or superior in their profession. This results in employment discrimination and divisiveness in the second-language acquisition industry, which favours young White native speakers from English speaking countries. The privileging of native speakers and Western pedagogical methods has long been critiqued by scholars. These practices cause anxiety amongst non-native speaking teachers, and decrease feelings of self-efficacy. Meanwhile, a large body of work in fields such as English as a lingua franca has shown that language use outside the classroom has moved away from dependence on native speaker norms. Native-speaker teachers face over-generalisations of their abilities and pedagogical knowledge, and their experience can be undermined in preference for their native language.

== Current responses ==
Native-speakerism is still influencing ELT hiring practices on an international scale. In the EU there have been recent attempts to bring recruiters to justice. In February 2024 an unprecedented case, of a discriminated French English teacher, was acknowledged and undertaken by the French Defender of Rights.
