= Jockey Club Government Secondary School =

Coordinates: 22°19′45.74″N 114°10′51.08″E

Jockey Club Government Secondary School 賽馬會官立中學
- 2B, Oxford Road, Kowloon Tong, Hong Kong

Information
- Type: Government
- Motto: 達識應物 (Insight and Harmony)
- Established: 1960
- Head teacher: Miss Yuen Ka-chung
- Enrollment: Approximately 870
- Language: Chinese medium
- Website: http://www.jcgss.edu.hk

Jockey Club Government Secondary School
- Traditional Chinese: 賽馬會官立中學
- Simplified Chinese: 赛马会官立中学
Transcriptions
Standard Mandarin
- Hanyu Pinyin: Sàimǎhuì Guānlì Zhōngxué
Yue: Cantonese
- Jyutping: coi3 maa5 wui6*2 gun1 laap6 zung1 hok6

Jockey Club Government Secondary School or JCGSS (Chinese: 賽馬會官立中學), formed in 1960, is a government funded full-time secondary school in Oxford Road, Kowloon Tong, Hong Kong. The school was named after the Royal Hong Kong Jockey Club who funded the construction of the school building complex.

== History ==
Jockey Club Government Secondary School was established in 1960 as Jockey Club Modern School (賽馬會實用中學). In the 1950s to 60's Hong Kong, 41% (according to the census) of the population were under the age of 15. It was due to the mass migration of Chinese refugees arrived in Hong Kong after the civil war. It presented an education crisis to the Government because the number of existing schools was not enough to cater the need of the children. As a result, a lot of schools were established in order to resolve the issue and JCGSS was one of them.

Due to the urgent need of education for a large population, classes was temporarily held in Perth Street Government School until 10 October 1961, when the current 3 storey building complex was completed. The school was divided to Morning School and Afternoon School in order to provide maximum number of seats. Both schools provided 3-year education aimed at preparing students for direct entry into employment or for further vocational training. The school was named after the Royal Hong Kong Jockey Club (now Hong Kong Jockey Club) which provided fund of HK$17.7 million for the construction of the building.

In 1963, the school was expanded to provide the standard 5-year secondary education and renamed Jockey Club Government Secondary Technical School (賽馬會官立工業中學). In the next year, JCGSTS became a full day school in order to offer better educational environment for students. In 1975, the school was once again expanded, to provide the 7-year full secondary education. The school was renamed to Jockey Club Government Secondary School in 1997.

== Principals ==
- Mr Tristan (Morning School); Mr S. K. Buse (Afternoon School) (1960–1963)
- Mr Barns (1963–1969)
- Mr H. J. Head (1969–1975)
- Mr Sit Chun Hoi (薛俊海)(1975–1988)
- Mr Chan Ping-tat (1988–1992)
- Mr Chan Ping-yuen (1992–1994)
- Mr Wong Yin-chun (1994–1996)
- Mr Yung Ye-sau (1996–1997)
- Mr Leung Woon-man (梁喚民) (1997–2005)
- Mr Hung Chun-may (洪進美) (2005–2007)
- Mrs Chan O Sui-fong (陳柯瑞芳) (2007–2011)
- Ms YUEN Ka-chung (袁家頌) (2011–2015)
- Mr. To Kok-on (杜國安) (2015–2017)
- Mrs. Leung Lui King (梁呂琼) (2017–present)

== See also ==
- Jockey Club Ti-I College
