= List of schools in Yuen Long District =

This is a list of schools in Yuen Long District, Hong Kong.

== Secondary schools ==
Government

- Chiu Lut Sau Memorial Secondary School
- New Territories Heung Yee Kuk Yuen Long District Secondary School
- Tin Shui Wai Government Secondary School
- Yuen Long Public Secondary School

Aided

- Bethel High School
- Buddhist Mau Fung Memorial College (佛教茂峰法師紀念中學)
- Caritas YL Chan Chun Ha Secondary School (明愛元朗陳震夏中學)
- CCC Fong Yun Wah Secondary School (中華基督教會方潤華中學)
- CCC Kei Long College (中華基督教會基朗中學)
- CCC Kei Yuen College (中華基督教會基元中學)
- CUHKFAA Thomas Cheung Secondary School (香港中文大學校友會聯會張煊昌中學)
- Cumberland Presbyterian Church Yao Dao Secondary School (金巴崙長老會耀道中學)
- The Evangelical Lutheran Church of Hong Kong Yuen Long Lutheran Secondary School (基督教香港信義會元朗信義中學)
- Gertrude Simon Lutheran College (路德會西門英才中學)
- The Hong Kong Management Association K S Lo College (香港管理專業協會羅桂祥中學)
- Ho Dao College (sponsored by Sik Sik Yuen) (可道中學（嗇色園主辦）)
- Jockey Club Man Kwan Eduyoung College (賽馬會萬鈞毅智書院)
- Ju Ching Chu Secondary School (Yuen Long) (裘錦秋中學（元朗）)
- Poh Tang Pui King Memorial College (博愛醫院鄧佩瓊紀念中學)
- Pui Shing Catholic Secondary School (天主教培聖中學)
- Queen Elizabeth School Old Students' Association Secondary School (伊利沙伯中學舊生會中學)
- Queen Elizabeth School Old Students' Association Tong Kwok Wah Secondary School (伊利沙伯中學舊生會湯國華中學)
- Shung Tak Catholic English College (天主教崇德英文書院)
- SKH Bishop Baker Secondary School (聖公會白約翰會督中學)
- SPHRC Kung Yik She Secondary School (十八鄉鄉事委員會公益社中學)
- STFA Yung Yau College (順德聯誼總會翁祐中學)
- Tin Shui Wai Methodist College (天水圍循道衞理中學)
- TWGH Cy Ma Memorial College (東華三院馬振玉紀念中學)
- TWGH Kwok Yat Wai College (東華三院郭一葦中學)
- TWGH Lo Kon Ting Memorial College (東華三院盧幹庭紀念中學)
- The Yuen Yuen Institute MFBM Nei Ming Chan Lui Chung Tak Memorial College (圓玄學院妙法寺內明陳呂重德紀念中學)
- YLPMSAA Tang Siu Tong Secondary School (元朗公立中學校友會鄧兆棠中學)
- Yuen Long Catholic Secondary School (元朗天主教中學)
- Yuen Long Merchants Association Secondary School (元朗商會中學)

Direct Subsidy Scheme

- Chinese YMCA Secondary School (中華基督教青年會中學)
- ELCHK Lutheran Academy (基督教香港信義會宏信書院)
- Heung To Middle School (Tin Shui Wai) (天水圍香島中學)
- HKFYG Lee Shau Kee College (香港青年協會李兆基書院)
- Man Kwan Pak Kau College (萬鈞伯裘書院)

Private

- Beacon College (遵理學校)
- Gertrude Simon Lutheran Evening College (路德會西門英才夜校)
- Rudolf Steiner Education Foundation Hong Kong Maria College

== Primary schools ==
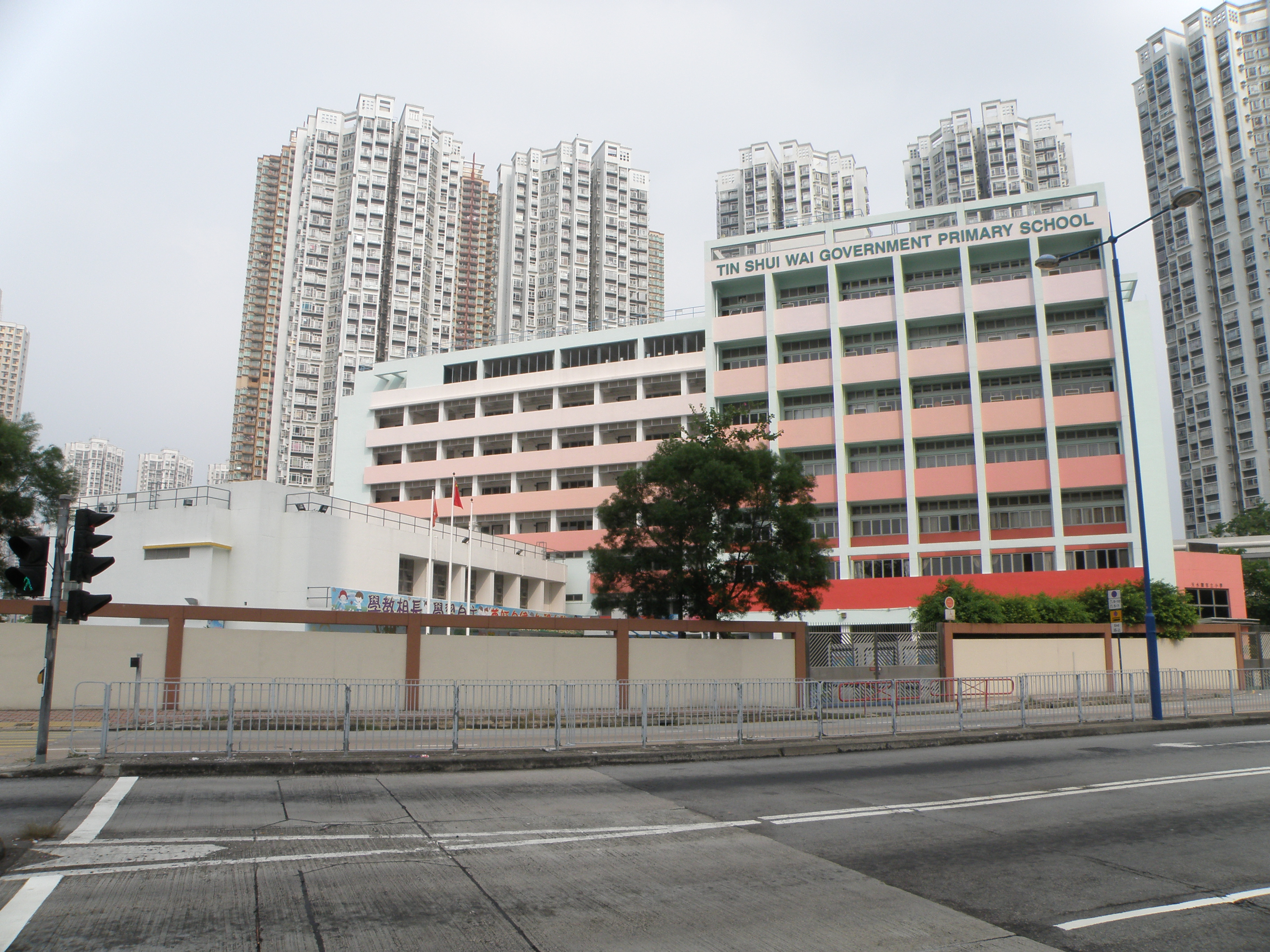
Tin Shui Wai Government Primary School

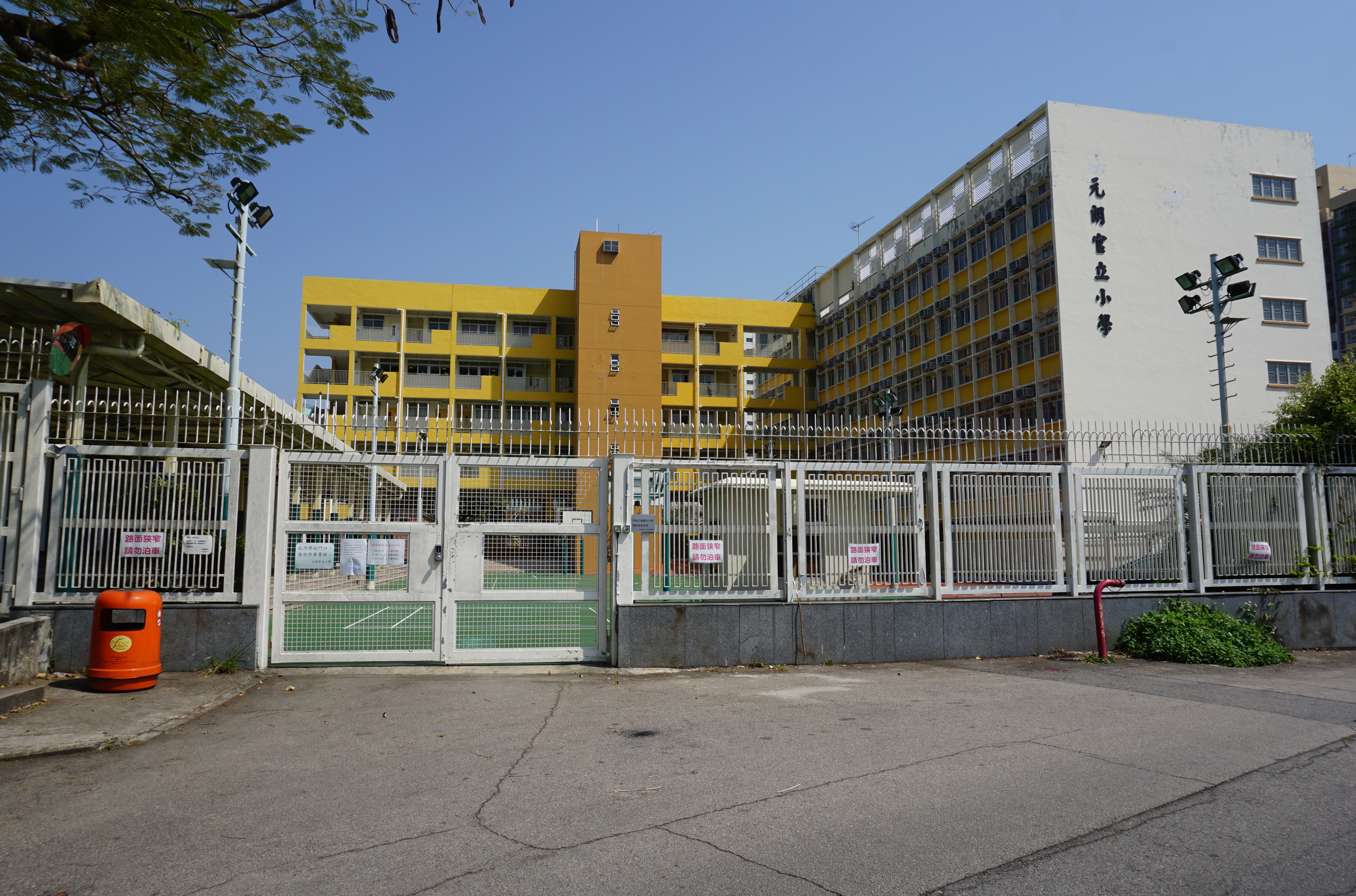
Yuen Long Government Primary School

Government

- South Yuen Long Government Primary School (南元朗官立小學)
- Tin Shui Wai Government Primary School (天水圍官立小學)
- Yuen Long Government Primary School (元朗官立小學)

Aided

- AD&FD of POHL Leung Sing Tak School (博愛醫院歷屆總理聯誼會梁省德學校)
- Buddhist Chan Wing Kan Memorial School (佛教陳榮根紀念學校)
- Buddhist Wing Yan School (佛教榮茵學校)
- C & M Alliance Chui Chak Lam Memorial School (基督教宣道會徐澤林紀念小學)
- CCC Chun Kwong Primary School (中華基督教會元朗真光小學)
- CCC Fong Yun Wah Primary School (中華基督教會方潤華小學)
- Chinese YMCA Primary School (中華基督教青年會小學)
- Chiu Yang Por Yen Primary School (潮陽百欣小學)
- Chiu Yang Primary School of Hong Kong (香港潮陽小學)
- Christian Alliance S Y Yeh Memorial Primary School (宣道會葉紹蔭紀念小學)
- Chung Sing School (鐘聲學校)
- Cumberland Presbyterian Church Yao Dao Primary School (金巴崙長老會耀道小學)
- Hong Kong and Macau Lutheran Church Wong Chan Sook Ying Memorial School (港澳信義會黃陳淑英紀念學校)
- HKFYG Lee Shau Kee Primary School (香港青年協會李兆基小學)
- Ho Ming Primary School SPSD by Sik Sik Yuen (嗇色園主辦可銘學校)
- Hong Kong Student Aid Society Primary School (香港學生輔助會小學)
- Kam Tin Mung Yeung Public School (錦田公立蒙養學校)
- Kwong Ming School (光明學校)
- Kwong Ming Ying Loi School (光明英來學校)
- Lions Clubs International Ho Tak Sum Primary School (獅子會何德心小學)
- Lok Sin Tong Leung Kai Kui Primary School (樂善堂梁銶琚學校)
- LST Leung Kau Kui Primary School (Branch) (樂善堂梁銶琚學校（分校）)
- Pat Heung Central Primary School (八鄉中心小學)
- Queen Elizabeth School Old Students' Association Branch Primary School (伊利沙伯中學舊生會小學分校)
- Queen Elizabeth School Old Students' Association Primary School (伊利沙伯中學舊生會小學)
- SKH Ling Oi Primary School (聖公會靈愛小學)
- SKH St Joseph's Primary School (聖公會聖約瑟小學)
- SKH Tin Shui Wai Ling Oi Primary School (聖公會天水圍靈愛小學)
- Shap Pat Heung Rural Committee Kung Yik She Primary School (十八鄉鄉事委員會公益社小學)
- STFA Wu Mien Tuen Primary School (順德聯誼總會伍冕端小學)
- Tin Shui Wai Catholic Primary School (天水圍天主教小學)
- Tin Shui Wai Methodist Primary School (天水圍循道衞理小學)
- Tun Yu School (惇裕學校)
- Tung Tak School (通德學校)
- TWGH Leo Tung-hai Lee Primary School (東華三院李東海小學)
- TWGH Yiu Dak Chi Memorial Primary School (Yuen Long) (東華三院姚達之紀念小學（元朗）)
- Xianggang Putonghua Yanxishe Primary School of Science and Creativity (香港普通話研習社科技創意小學)
- Yuen Long Long Ping Estate Tung Koon Primary School (元朗朗屏邨東莞學校)
- Yuen Long Public Middle School Alumni Association Tang Ying Yip Primary School (元朗公立中學校友會鄧英業小學)
- Yuen Long Public Middle School Alumni Association Primary School (元朗公立中學校友會小學)
- Yuen Long Long Ping Estate Wai Chow School (元朗朗屏邨惠州學校)
- Yuen Long Merchants Association Primary School (元朗商會小學)
- Yuen Long Po Kok Primary School (元朗寶覺小學)

Direct Subsidy Scheme

- ELCHK Lutheran Academy (基督教香港信義會宏信書院)
- W F Joseph Lee Primary School (和富慈善基金李宗德小學)

Private

- Anchors Academy (安基司學校)
- ELCHK Lutheran School (基督教香港信義會啟信學校)
- Gigamind English Primary School (激活英文小學)
- Zenith Primary School & Kindergarten (英藝小學暨幼稚園)

== Special schools ==
Aided

- Buddhist TCS Yeung Yat Lam Memorial School (道慈佛社楊日霖紀念學校)
- Caritas Lok Kan School (明愛樂勤學校)
- Hong Chi Morningjoy School, Yuen Long (匡智元朗晨樂學校)
- Hong Chi Morninglight School, Yuen Long (匡智元朗晨曦學校)
- PLK Law's Foundation School (保良局羅氏信託學校)
