= Yat Chak (constituency) =

Hong Kong electoral district

- Elected constituency for the Yuen Long District Council
- Boundary of Yat Chak in Yuen Long District
- District: Yuen Long
- Legislative Council constituency: New Territories North
- Population: 20,392 (2019)
- Electorate: 11,627 (2019)

Current constituency
- Created: 2003
- Number of members: One
- Member: Vacant

Yat Chak (Chinese: 逸澤) is one of the 39 constituencies in the Yuen Long District of Hong Kong. The constituency returns one district councillor to the Yuen Long District Council, with an election every four years.

Yat Chak constituency is loosely based on Tin Chak Estate and part of Tin Yat Estate in Tin Shui Wai with estimated population of 20,392.

== Councillors represented ==
Election	Member	Party
2003	Wong Yu-choi	Nonpartisan
2011	Kwok Hing-ping	Democratic
2014	Kwok Hing-ping	Nonpartisan
2019	Wong Wing-sze→Vacant	Civic Passion

== Election results ==
=== 2010s ===
Yuen Long District Council Election, 2019: Yat Chak
Party	Candidate	Votes	%	±%
Civic Passion	Wong Wing-sze	4,454	58.14	
Independent	Kwok Hing-ping	2,607	34.03	−19.78
Nonpartisan	Regine Fan Hui-yu	600	7.83	
Majority		1,847	24.11	
Turnout		7,687	66.15	
Civic Passion gain from Nonpartisan		Swing		

Yuen Long District Council Election, 2015: Yat Chak
Party	Candidate	Votes	%	±%
Nonpartisan	Kwok Hing-ping	2,288	53.81	+1.17
Nonpartisan	Wong Yu-choi	1,468	34.53	−12.83
Nonpartisan	Wong Yuen-fai	496	11.67	
Majority		820	19.28	
Turnout		4,252	41.63	
Nonpartisan hold		Swing		

Yuen Long District Council Election, 2011: Yat Chak
Party	Candidate	Votes	%	±%
Democratic	Kwok Hing-ping	1,735	52.64	+20.70
Nonpartisan	Wong Yu-choi	1,561	47.36	−6.01
Majority		174	5.28	
Turnout		3,296	37.49	
Democratic gain from Nonpartisan		Swing		

=== 2000s ===
Yuen Long District Council Election, 2007: Yat Chak
Party	Candidate	Votes	%	±%
Independent	Wong Yu-choi	1,489	53.37	+10.24
Democratic	Kwok Hing-ping	891	31.94	
Nonpartisan	Cheung Wah-yau	193	6.92	
Nonpartisan	Luk Wing-chuen	142	4.17	
Nonpartisan	Ng Chun-choi	43	1.54	
Majority		598	21.43	
Independent win (new seat)				

Yuen Long District Council Election, 2003: Yat Chak
Party	Candidate	Votes	%	±%
Nonpartisan	Wong Yu-choi	1,123	43.13	
DAB	Francisco Yung Doi-wah	781	29.99	
Democratic Alliance	Wong Siu-han	700	26.88	
Majority		342	13.14	
Nonpartisan win (new seat)				
