= Tin Chak Estate =

Public housing estate in Tin Shui Wai, Hong Kong

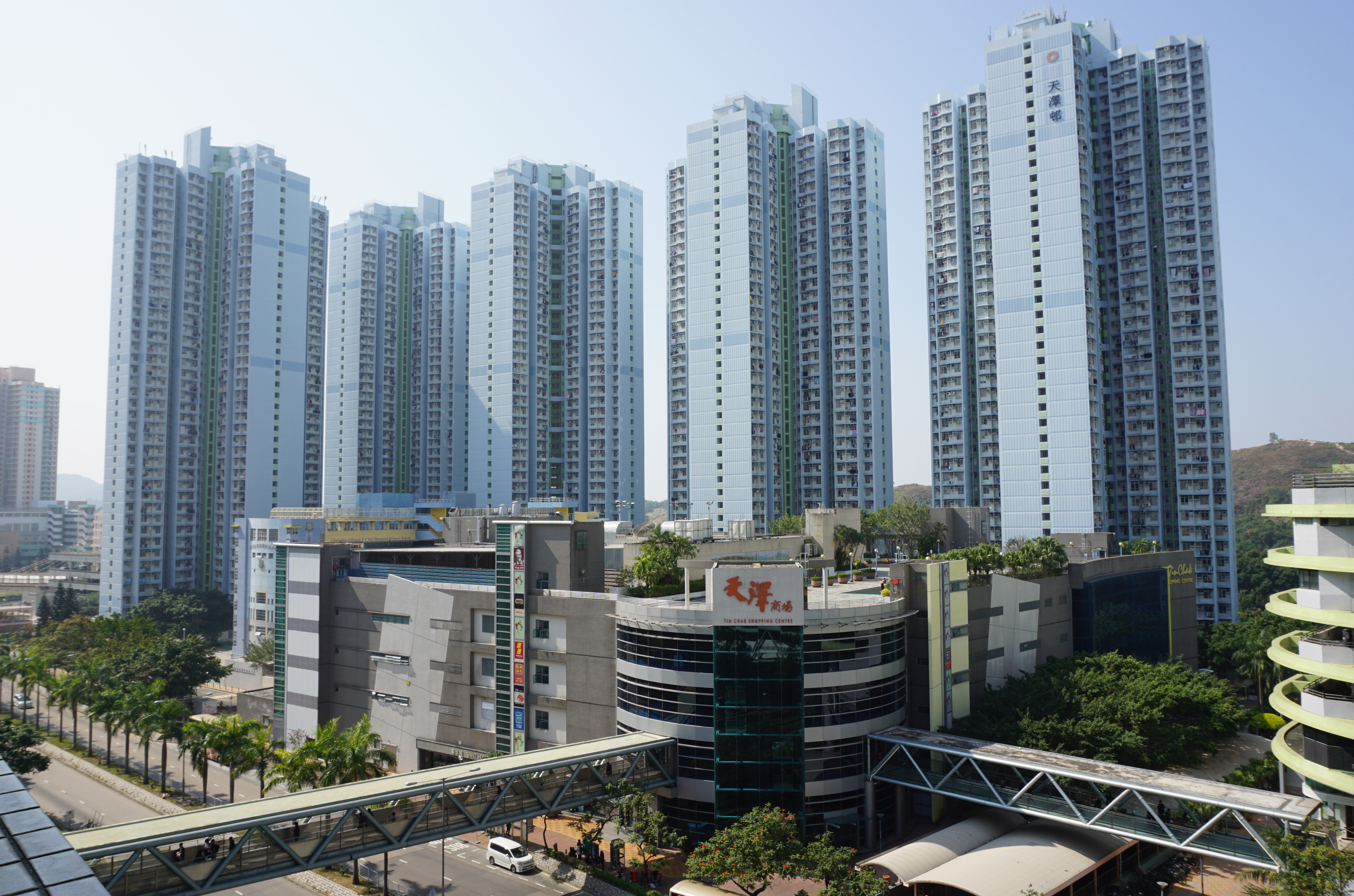
- Tin Chak Estate
- Interactive map of Tin Chak Estate

General information
- Location: 73 Tin Shui Road, Tin Shui Wai; New Territories, Hong Kong
- Coordinates: 22.4677822°N 113.9975337°E
- Status: Completed
- Category: Public rental housing
- Population: 11,695 (2016)
- No. of blocks: 6
- No. of units: 4,216

Construction
- Constructed: 2001; 25 years ago
- Authority: Hong Kong Housing Authority

Tin Chak Estate (Chinese: 天澤邨) is a public housing estate in Tin Shui Wai, New Territories, Hong Kong, near Light Rail Tin Yat stop. It consists of nine residential buildings completed in 2001.

Hong Kong Public Libraries operates the Tin Shui Wai North Public Library in the Tin Chak Shopping Centre in Tin Chak Estate.

== Houses ==
Name	Chinese name	Building type	Completed
Chak Fai House	澤輝樓	Harmony 1	2001
Chak Sing House	澤星樓	Harmony 1	2001
Chak Sun House	澤辰樓	Harmony 1	2001
Chak Yun House	澤潤樓	Harmony 1	2001
Chak Yu House	澤宇樓	Harmony 1	2001
Ancillary Facilities Block	服務設施大樓	Senior Citizens	2001

== Demographics ==
According to the 2016 by-census, Tin Chak Estate had a population of 11,695. The median age was 43.8 and the majority of residents (96.8 per cent) were of Chinese ethnicity. The average household size was 3 people. The median monthly household income of all households (i.e. including both economically active and inactive households) was HK$24,000.

== Politics ==
Tin Chak Estate is located in Yat Chak constituency of the Yuen Long District Council. It is currently represented by Wong Wing-sze, who was elected in the 2019 elections.

== See also ==
- Public housing estates in Tin Shui Wai
