= Wetlands of Hong Kong =

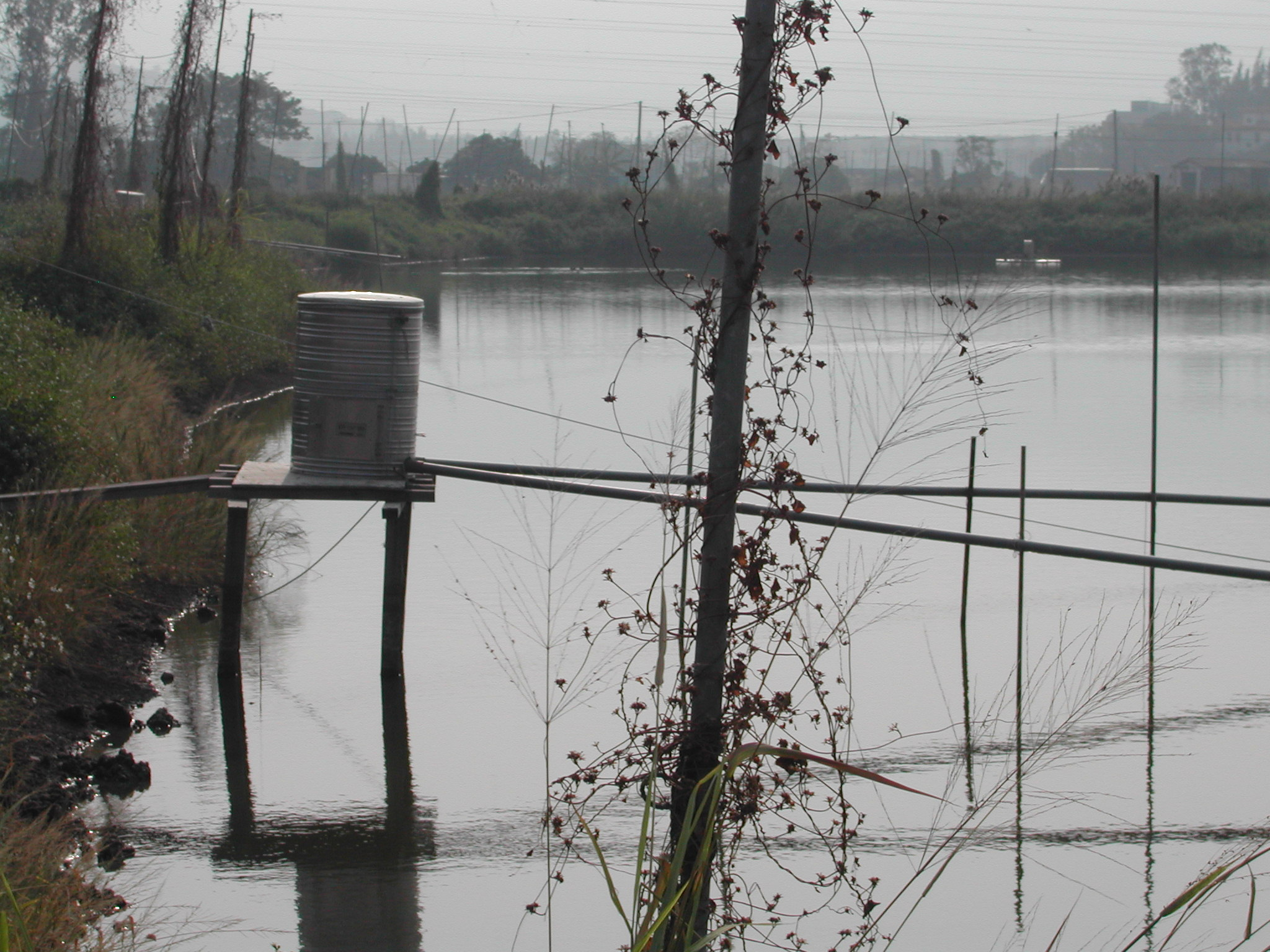

There are few natural wetlands in Hong Kong because most were used as sites for shallow shrimp ponds (gei wai) and oyster farming. Presently, the bulk of these wetlands are unused farmlands such as the Long Valley wetland (塱原濕地). These wetlands are mostly located near Deep Bay, which is an area close to the Pearl River estuary.

The Mai Po Marshes is the biggest and the most famous of these. In the 1940s, this wetland was a mangrove swamp covering 200 hectares (490 acres) and they were converted to fish ponds and parts of it were also reclaimed to provide land for the development of the Tin Shui Wai new town.‌

Biodiversity is a concern in these wetlands and around 3,420 hectares (8,500 acres) are considered ecologically important as habitats for rare and fragile creatures. The wetlands are home to a unique combination of flora and fauna, which includes seagrass, mangrove, amphibian, bird, butterfly, dragonfly, fish, macroinvertebrates, mammal, and reptile species.

Due to the limited land in Hong Kong the area is threatened by land development, particularly residential projects that are rising near Hong Kong's Deep Bay and even the Mai Po Ramsar site. The government often approves development if construction proposals satisfy the so-called no-net-loss-of-wetland principle. This can be demonstrated in the way Kowloon–Canton Railway Corporation (KCRC) built part of the Lok Ma Chau Spur Line as an underground tunnel to cross the Long Valley wetland. Usually, the principle entails the artificial creation of wetlands to compensate for the loss of the original in the course of construction. Critics, however, point out that this policy is ineffective because the newly created wetlands are usually inferior.‌

== See also ==
- Mai Po Marshes
- Hong Kong Wetland Park
- Nam Sang Wai
