= SPHRC Kung Yik She Secondary School =

Secondary school in Tin Shui Wai, Hong Kong

- 十八鄉鄉事委員會公益社中學
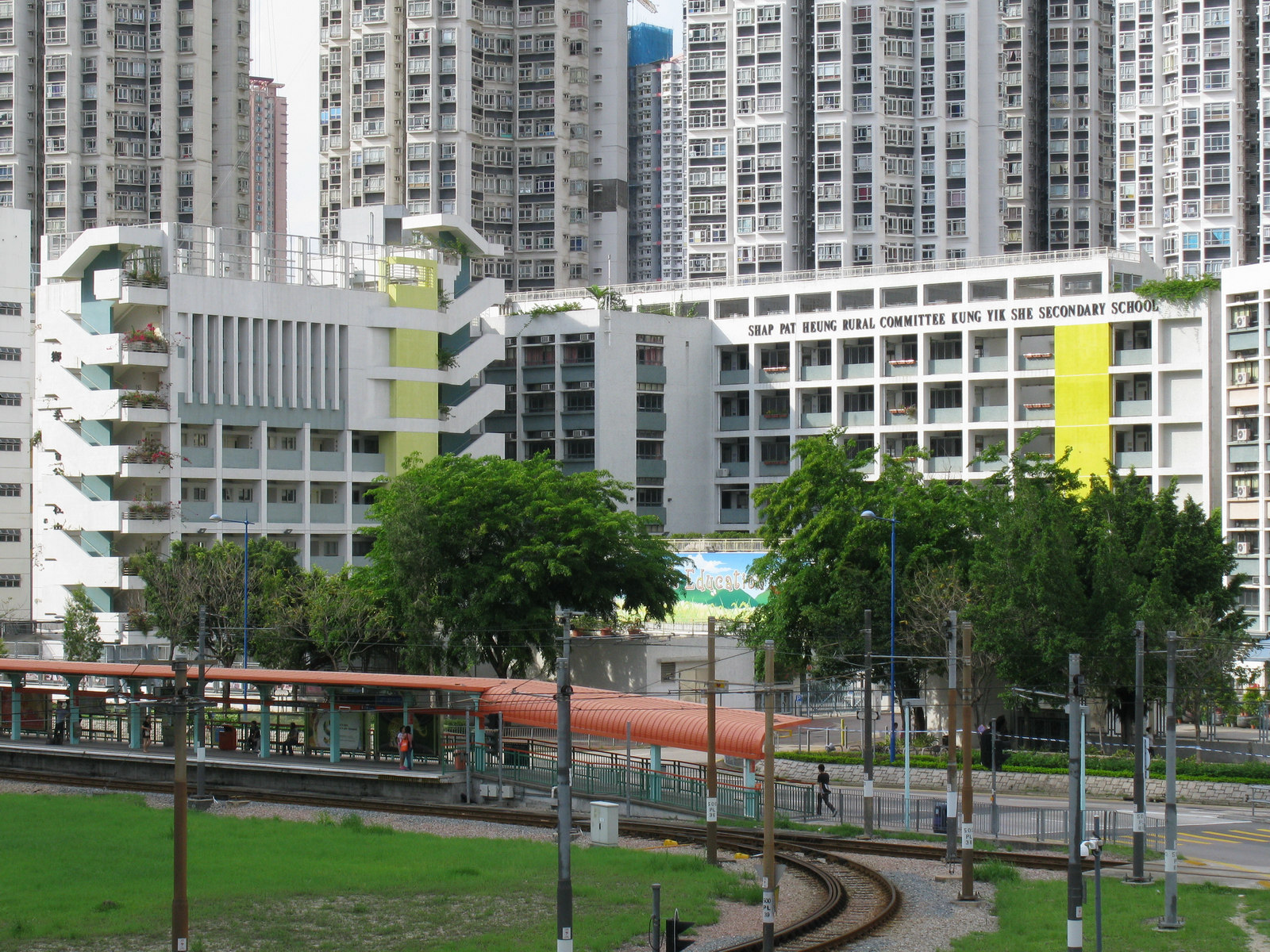
- Pictured in 2009

Location
- 20 Tin Shing Road, Tin Shui Wai, New Territories; Hong Kong
- Coordinates: 22.460213°N 114.003354°E

Information
- School type: Aided Secondary school
- Motto: 博學篤志
- Established: September 1996; 29 years ago
- Sister school: SPHRC Kung Yik She Primary School
- School district: Yuen Long District
- Chairman: Leung Fuk-yuen
- Principal: Liu Siu-lin
- Teaching staff: 56 (as of 2017)
- Employees: 93 (as of 2017)
- Grades: 6
- Gender: Co-educational
- Classes: 24 (as of 2017)
- Student to teacher ratio: 13.5:1
- Language: Predominantly Chinese
- Campus size: About 6,180 m²
- Houses: Red; Yellow; Blue; Green
- Mascot: Water rocket (unofficial)
- Affiliation: Shap Pat Heung Rural Committee
- Website: www.sphrc.edu.hk

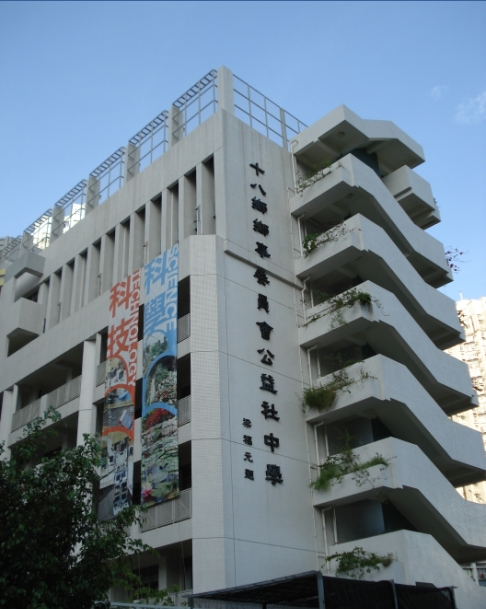
A closer look of the school

Shap Pat Heung Rural Committee Kung Yik She Secondary School is an aided Hong Kong secondary school founded in September 1996. Located at Tin Shing Road in Tin Shui Wai, it is the only secondary school established by Shap Pat Heung Rural Committee. Since the retirement of then-principal Yeung Ng Wai-chun, Liu Siu-lin has been the principal of the school.

== School academics ==
The school actively arranges science and technology related competitions for students. From time to time one may encounter small groups of students collaborating or discussing the competitions on campus. The students are talented in many ways, which laid the ground for the development of gifted education. Some students are not confident enough of their abilities, though.

When the school opened in 1996, the course "life education" and the corresponding Subject Board were established. The school was the first in Hong Kong to teach "life education" in secondary schools. The school plays an important role promoting life education in the local academia.

In recent years, the school's public examination results have improved. The school's add-value rate is the highest in the district. 2009 HKCEE subject pass rate of 94%; HKALE subject pass rate is 85%. Schools have also invested lot of resources in English education. Students' level of English has been improved steadily; however, there remains room for improvement.

== Science Park ==
The school is recognized for its science and technology education. The school has established a large-scale "Science Park", which is committed to the development of science and technology education. Science Park costs approximately 1.6 million Hong Kong dollars, mainly sponsored by the Quality Education Fund and the China Light and Power funds. It includes a biotechnology lab, greenhouses, plant tissue culture rooms, orchards, and other ecological-centric facilities.

Teachers and students from Mainland China, Singapore, Thailand and the United Kingdom have visited the Science Park. Nevertheless, the project has been criticized for focusing solely on science education, ignoring the needs of arts students. Also, the volleyball field is too close to the facilities, affecting the training of volleyball team. Meanwhile, many teachers and students regard such a project serves for promotional purpose more than educational purpose.

== History ==
=== Prior to 1996: organizing phase ===
- In 1995, to be allocated in Tin Shui Wai Area 27 standard designs for the construction of a secondary school; the contractor charges approximately 5 million Hong Kong dollars.

=== From 1996 to 2000 ===
- September 1996, the school was offered a temporary registration status (offering the use of temporary registration as a normal procedure)
- In 1998, the school graduates its first form five students. In the same year, the school receives formal registration status.
- In 1998, the school is forced to change its medium of instruction from English to Chinese by the Government.
- In 1999, the Quality Education Fund grants 500,000 Hong Kong dollars for the establishment of school orchestra. In the same year, Girl Scouts are also established. The first open day held at the school.
- In 2000, the Parent-Teacher Association was officially established.

=== From 2001 to 2003 ===
- Fifth anniversary in 2002. The first school open day, and encapsulates a time capsule.
- May 2002, Parent-Teacher Association meeting venue "Concentric Circle" is put into operation.
- In 2002, the Red Cross sets up.
- July 2003, school improvement works commence, including the construction of a new wing.

=== From 2004 to 2008 ===
In addition to the award-winning science and technology, an increasing number of programs, including music, arts and sports, see increased development. The former English teacher Miss Cheung Chok Yee describes the school "as a young institution...experiencing rapid growth after the establishment of the school."

- In 2004, students receive third prize in the International Year of Rice Art and Design Competition.
- The school makes gains in science and technology competitions in 2004 and 2005, winning more than 40 in a single year. The school gained much media attention, in addition to some reports that were made on behalf of the school's request. In 2006 and 2007, the students reach the Hong Kong Budding Scientists Awards final top ten and in 2006 receive the bronze medal at the "Third International Junior Science Olympiad." In 2007, students win the "Hong Kong Student Science Project Competition" research team championship. Because of the school's outstanding performance in science education, the Education Bureau, together with the TVB, produce a half-hour TV programme with the school as its theme. The episode appears on 23 January 2007 on the Jade Channel.
- In 2005, the first phase of the new "Science Park" is completed. The new wing was completed in August 2005 and officially opened March 2006 for the school's tenth anniversary celebration. The school also receives government grants of 3 million Hong Kong dollars (disbursed over 6 years) to hire additional English language teachers and develop school-based curriculum to enhance the quality of teaching English.

=== From 2009 onwards ===
- Some Facebook groups, which criticize the school, are created during 2009 and 2010. Meanwhile, the Student Union was established on 2009/2010 academic year, replacing the role of co-curricular activities student group.
- There are some controversies that the loss rate of staff is too high such that the students feel hard to get used to the teaching style of new teachers every year. Students have attributed this to the tension between the school principal and teachers, arising from the ambition of the school principal to rapidly develop the school.
- The school sets Guinness World Record of launching most water rockets simultaneously on 7 December 2013, where they launched 1056 of them at the same time, together with primary school students in Tin Shui Wai. This act was met with objection from some students on the ground that it is a waste of school resource and the activity is not very educational. Students also reported that plastic bottles used for constructing the water rockets were not recycled, causing environmental problems.

== Class Structure (2009-2010) ==
One	Two	Three	Four	Five	Six	Seven
5	5	5	5	4 (1 Arts + 2 Sciences + 1 Commerce)	2 (1 Arts + 1 Sciences)	2 (1 Arts + 1 Sciences)

- A total of 28 classes
- Teacher-student ratio of 1:16.5
- Male to female ratio is approximately 1:1.14 (2009-10 year)

== Language policy ==
- F.1 to F.3: The majority of subjects taught in Chinese and then join the enrichment part of English. 2010-11 school year may operate a maximum of one English class in each grade.
- F.4 to F.6: science subjects taught in Chinese and English in separate groups; arts be taught in Chinese.
