= Tin Shui Wai =

Tin Shui Wai New Town 天水圍新市鎮
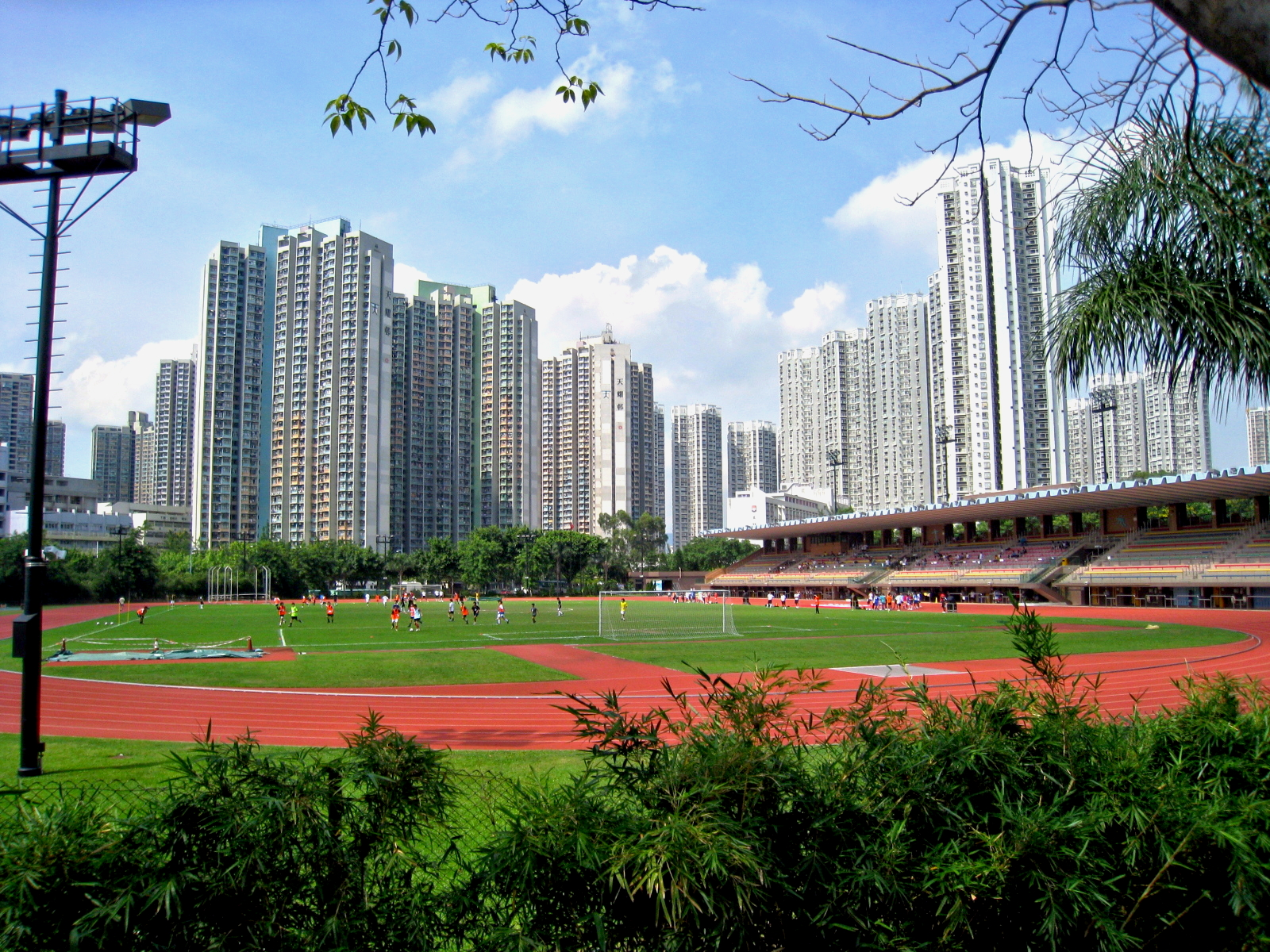
- Tin Shui Wai Sports Ground

- Location within Hong Kong
- Coordinates: 22.460°N 114.002°E
- Country: China
- SAR: Hong Kong
- Region: New Territories
- District: Yuen Long District
- Established: 1993; 33 years ago

Area
  - Total: 4.3 km^{2} (1.7 sq mi)

Population (2016)
  - Total: 286,232
  - Density: 67,906/km^{2} (175,880/sq mi)
- Website: Yuen Long District Council

Tin Shui Wai New Town
- Traditional Chinese: 天水圍新市鎮
- Simplified Chinese: 天水围新市镇
- Cantonese Yale: Tīnséuiwài Sānsíhjan
- Literal meaning: Sky Water Walled Village New Town
Transcriptions
Standard Mandarin
- Hanyu Pinyin: Tiānshuǐwéi Xīnshìzhèn
- Wade–Giles: T'ien-shui-wei Hsin-shih-chen
Yue: Cantonese
- Yale Romanization: Tīnséuiwài Sānsíhjan
- Jyutping: Tin1seoi2wai4 San1si5zan3

Tin Shui Wai New Town is a satellite town in the northwestern New Territories of Hong Kong. Originally a gei wai (基圍) fish pond area, it was developed in the 1980s as the second new town in Yuen Long District and the eighth in Hong Kong. It is 25 kilometres (16 mi) due northwest of Central, the main business area in the territory, on land reclaimed from low-lying areas south of Deep Bay, next to Ping Shan. The population was 283,595 as of 2021.

== History ==
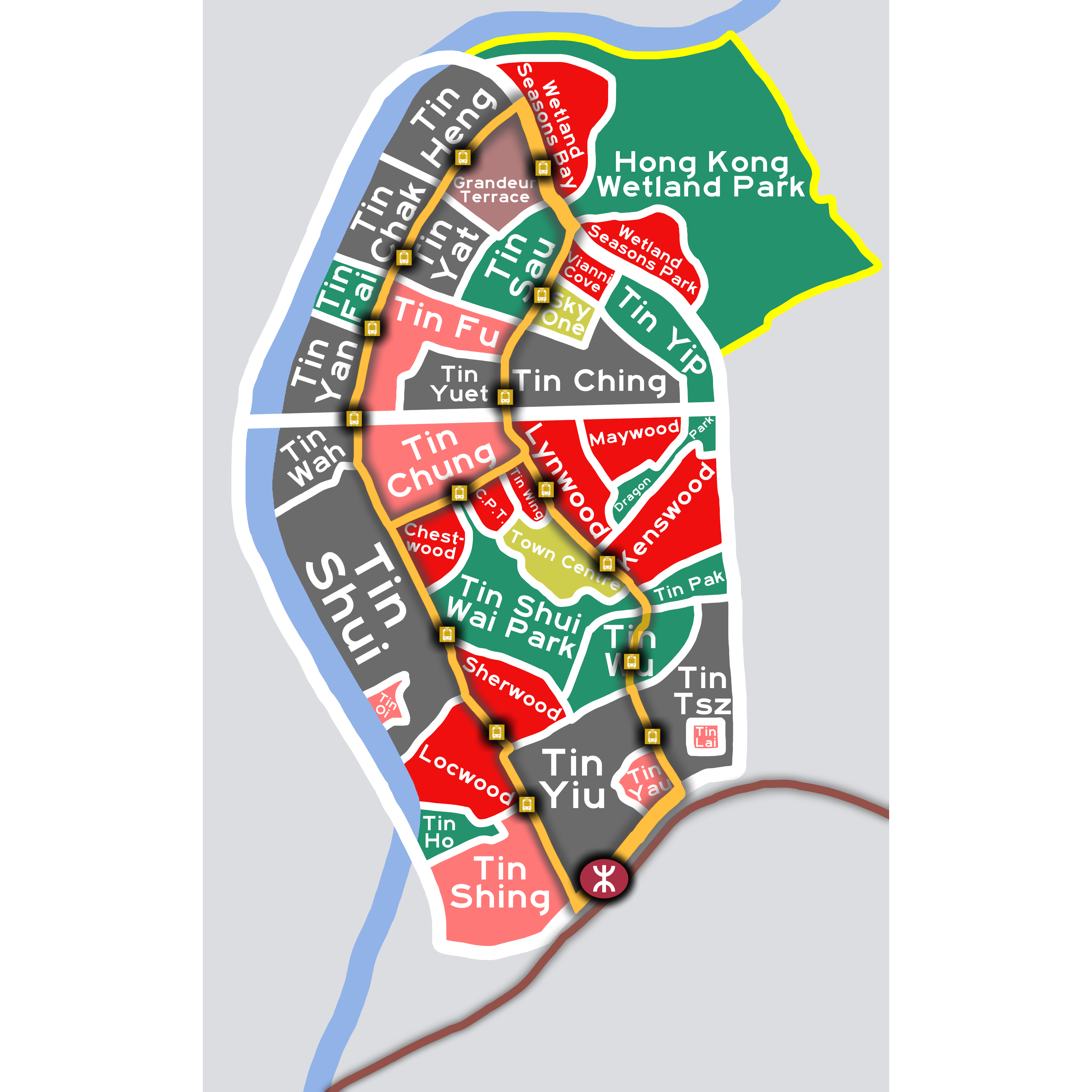
Map of Tin Shui Wai New Town Subzones as of 2022

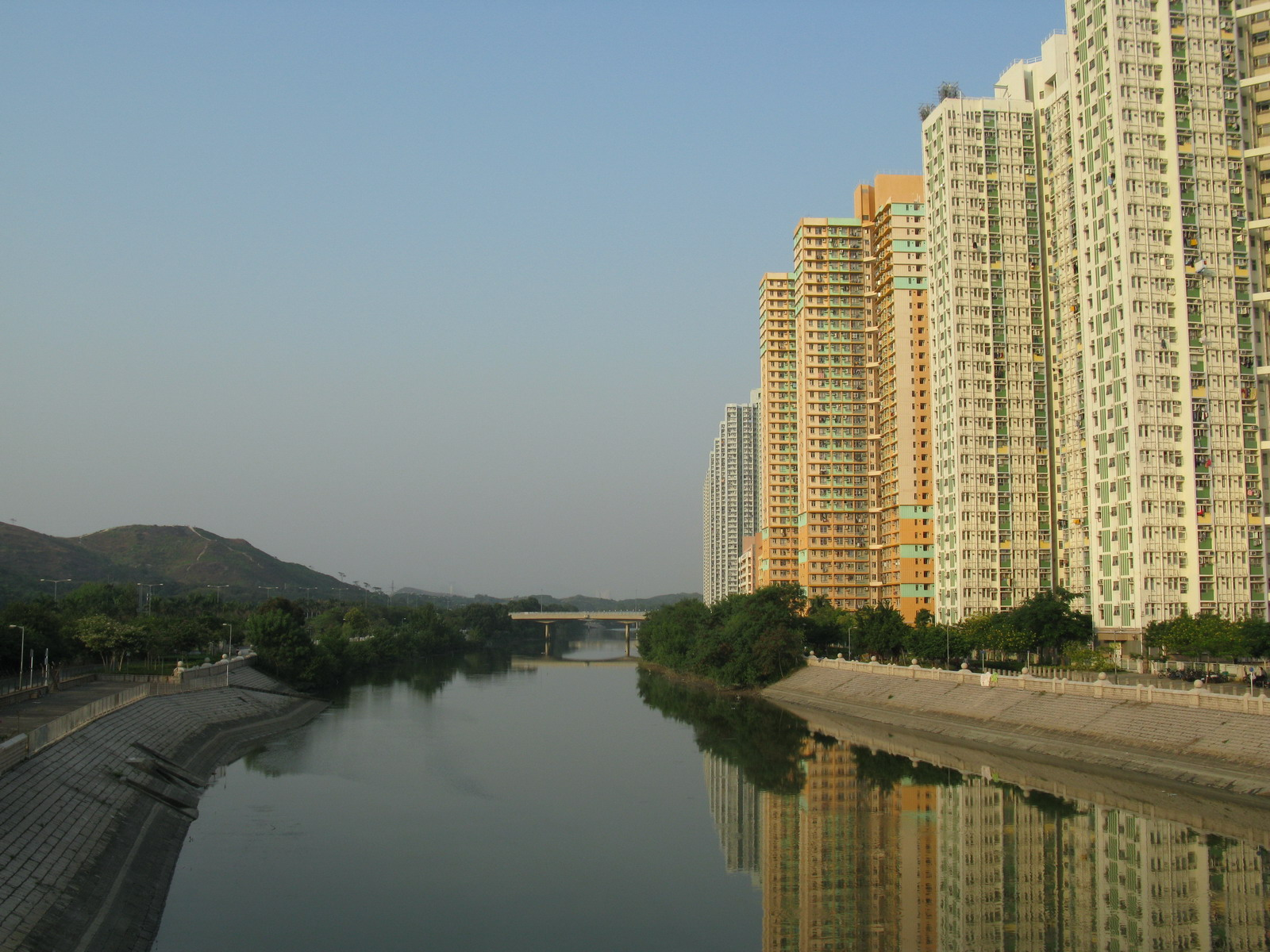

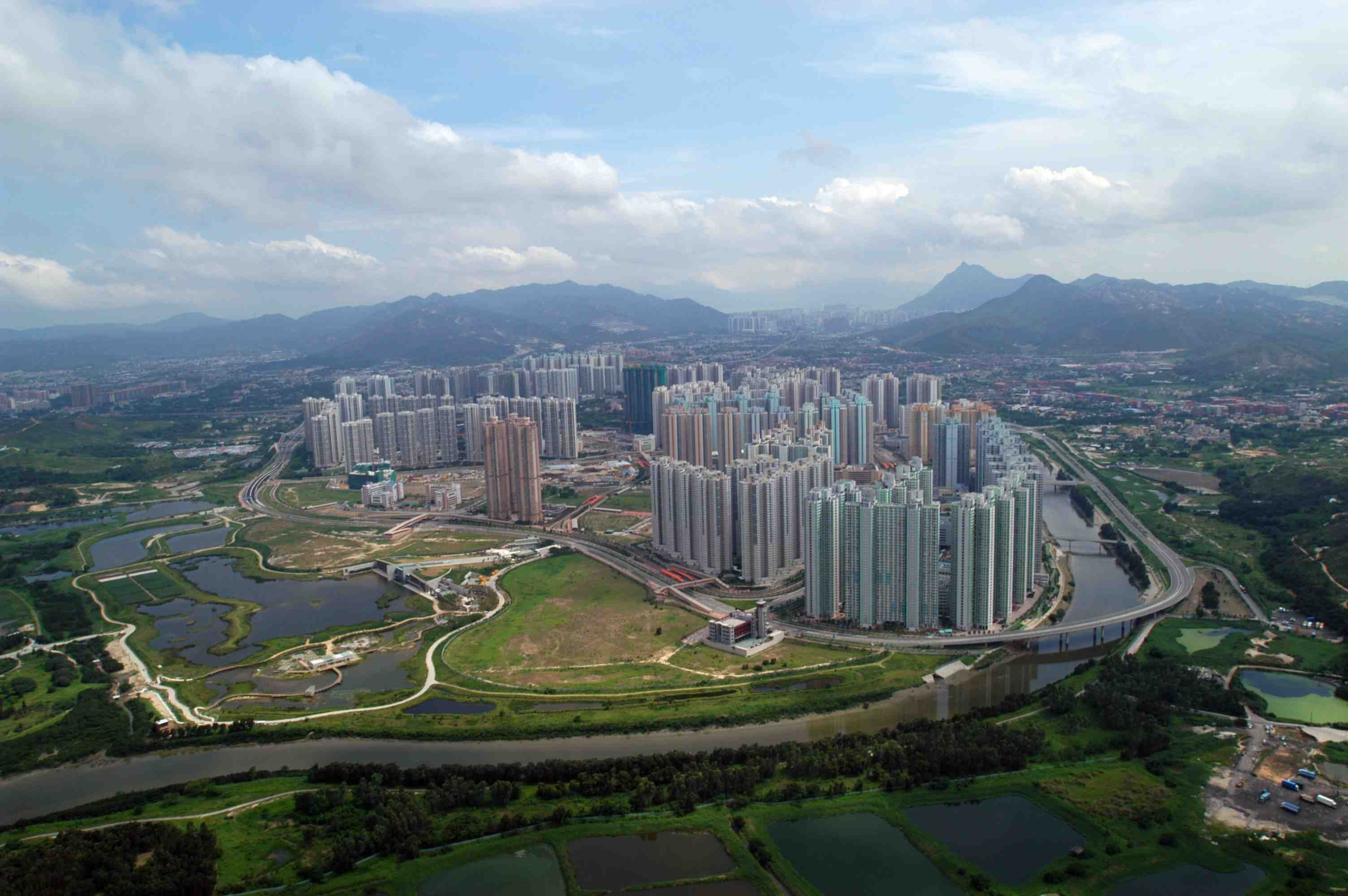
Tin Shui Wai in 2005

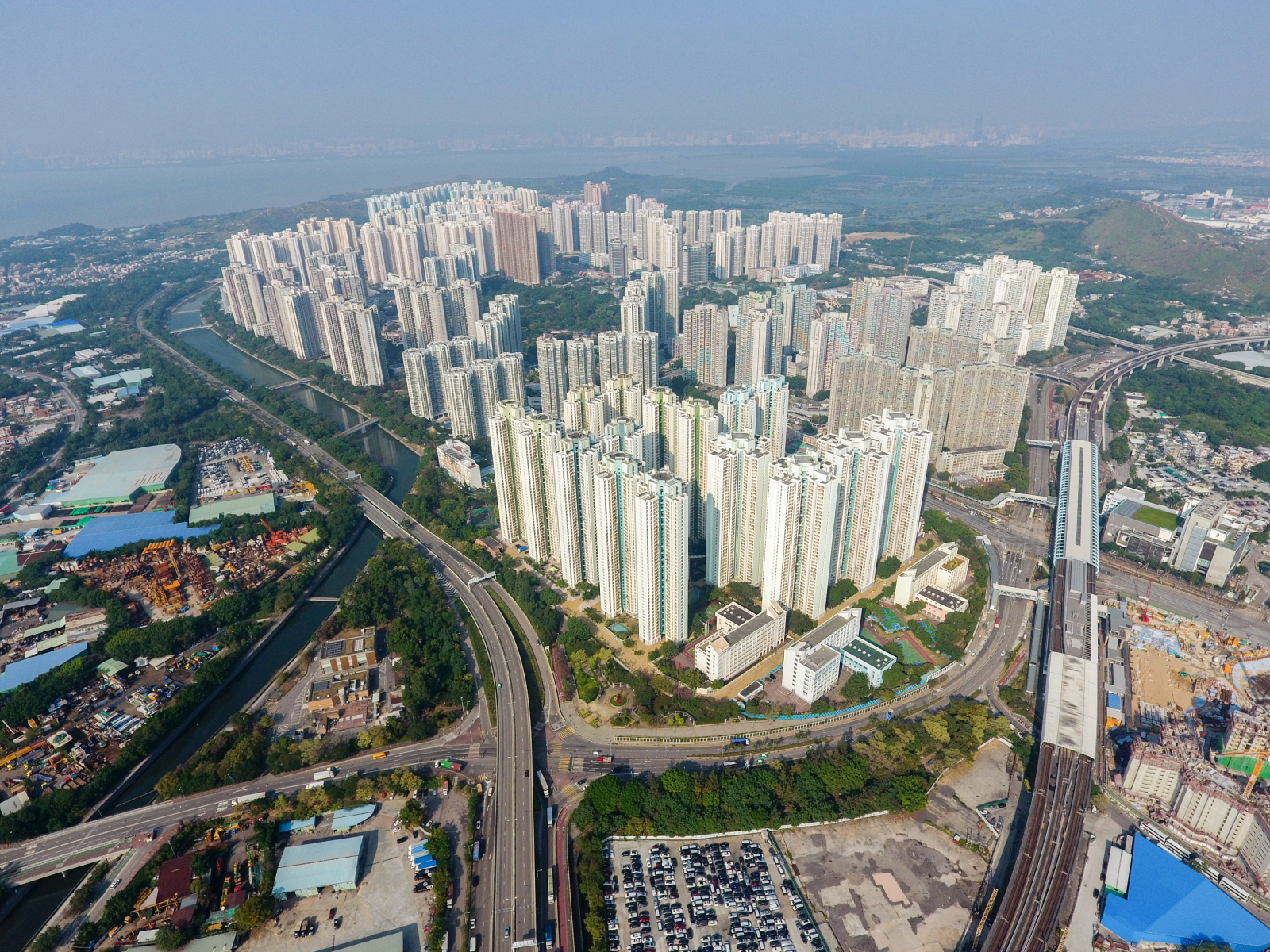
Tin Shui Wai in 2016

The land on which Tin Shui Wai was built did not exist at the beginning of the 1900s, while the adjacent Ping Shan was by the sea. The water north of Ping Shan gradually turned to marshes and villagers converted them into pools and rice paddies. The pools became gei wai fish ponds where most of the residents were fishermen before the new town was developed. With the decline in aquaculture, most of the fish ponds were abandoned. The Hong Kong Government developed the area into a new town through land reclamation.

=== New town development ===
The new town, conceived in 1987 to house 140,000 people, was constructed on 2.4 square kilometres (590 acres) of reclaimed fishponds and wetland representing one quarter of the flat land in the New Territories. The process of land reclamation for the new town was completed in 1990. Formation of the 2.4 km^{2} was estimated to cost HK$820 million in a contract signed with a Chinese joint-venture company. 20 million cubic metres (706.29 million cubic feet) of material would be required for the landfill. Maximum possible land formation was 4.88 km^{2}.

The government was accused by the developers of stalling the release of land for political reasons. Tin Shui Wai Development, a company 51% owned by China Resources and 49% by Cheung Kong Holdings, sued the government for damages caused by delays in handing over 388,000 m^{2} of land for development originally promised for 1985. The land was eventually handed over in May 1989.

The first occupants moved into the new town in 1991. The Housing Authority launched 6,459 Home Ownership Scheme flats in the area at steep discounts to an adjacent private estate and attracted some 90,000 applications.

A new modular style of construction for the public housing estates allowed rapid development and, in a first for a new town, on 26 March 1993 Tin Shui Wai was officially opened by Governor Chris Patten. By that time, some 30,000 people were living there.

The Development Zone of 220 hectares, in the southern part of the new town, has been developed to house about 200,000 people. An LRT (Light Rail Transit) line‌ and new roads linking the town to the trunk road network provide good connections to the Yuen Long and Tuen Mun districts and to the urban areas beyond.

Further expansion of the new town into the remaining areas to the north, known as the Reserve Zone, with an area of 210 hectares, commenced in July 1998. The infrastructure was completed in stages from 2000 to 2004 to cope with population intake of the housing developments.

In the early 2000's, Tin Shui Wai developed a notorious reputation as a "city of sadness". The town was criticized for its cramped public housing, isolation, and lack of employment opportunities. On 25 November 2007, numerous residents rallied outside government headquarters to push for more aid and reform for the area. Many demanded the government to create new hospitals, jobs, and increase police enforcement in the town.

West Rail and the extension of the LRT service to the Reserve Zone were commissioned in late 2003. To the northeastern portion of the new town, a constructed wetland has been completed which serves as a buffer between the developments in the Reserve Zone and the Mai Po Nature Reserve. The wetland has been further developed into the Hong Kong Wetland Park, opening to public in May 2006. The total planned population of Tin Shui Wai is about 306,000 while the current population is about 292,000.

== Environment ==
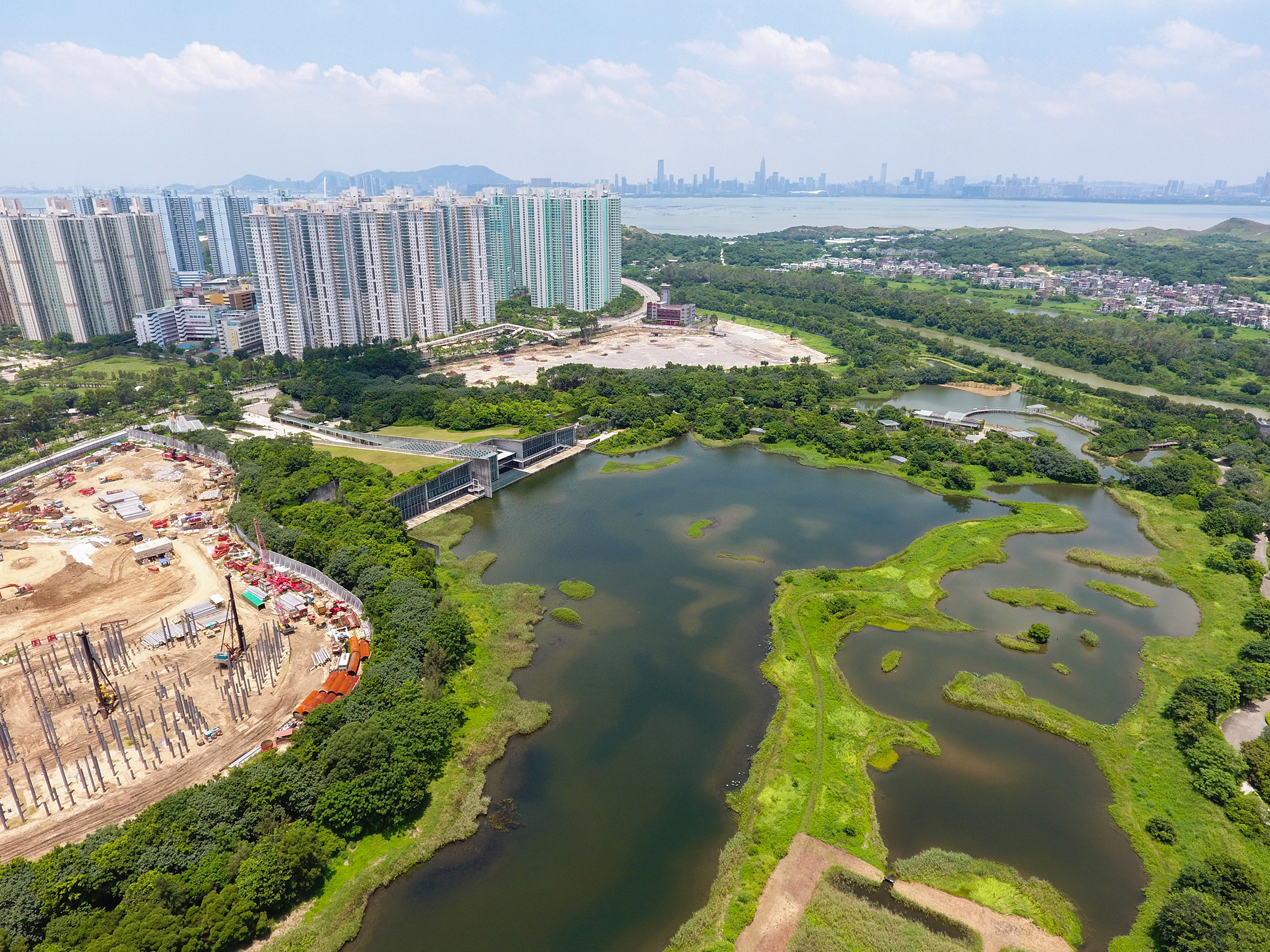
Wetland Park

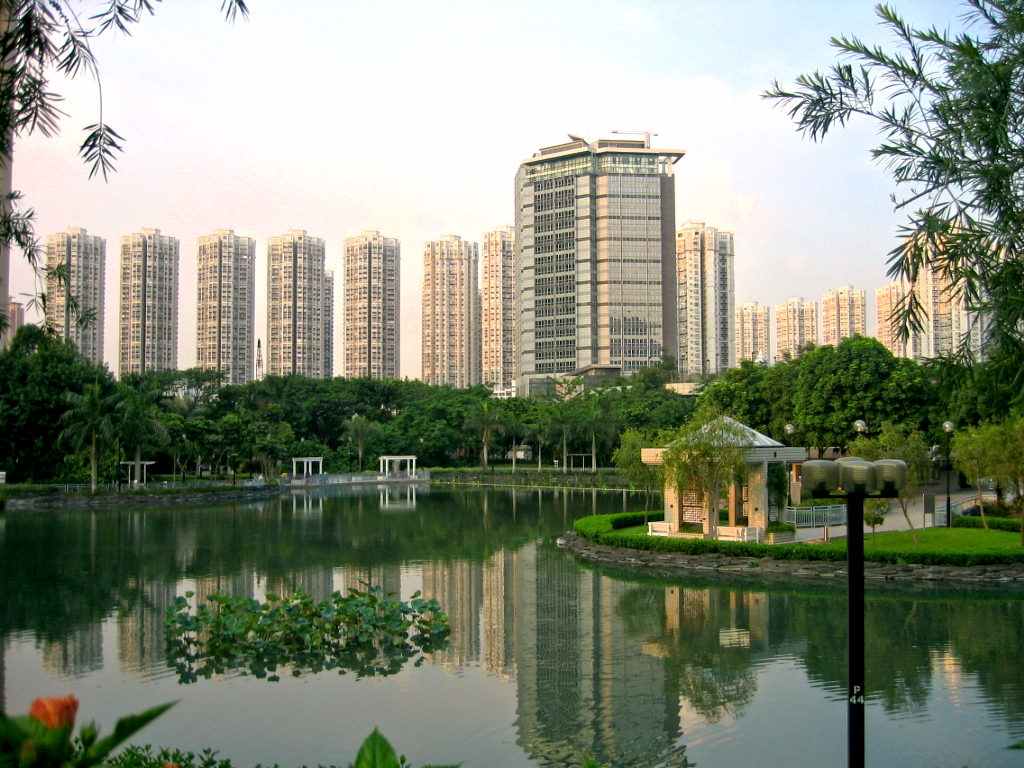
Tin Shui Wai Park

Parts of Tin Shui Wai have a picturesque and tranquil environment. The Hong Kong Wetland Park, demonstrating the diversity of the Hong Kong's wetland ecosystem, is in north Tin Shui Wai.

Tin Shui Wai consists of public and private housing estates. Tin Wah Road separates the south and the north development zones. The south development zone first started in the early 1990s and has since become a unique community. Since Tin Shui Wai was planned and developed from scratch, locals enjoy wider walkways and larger open areas when compared to other urban developments in Hong Kong.

Following the completion of the north development zone, the government planned to build 85,000 units and apartments annually in Hong Kong after 1997. As such, the north development zone has residential apartment buildings that are generally taller and denser than those in the south zone. The population of Tin Shui Wai rose rapidly over the last part of the century but has since stabilised. The government has been criticised for maintaining an insufficient level of services and facilities to meet the rapid population growth.

== Sights ==
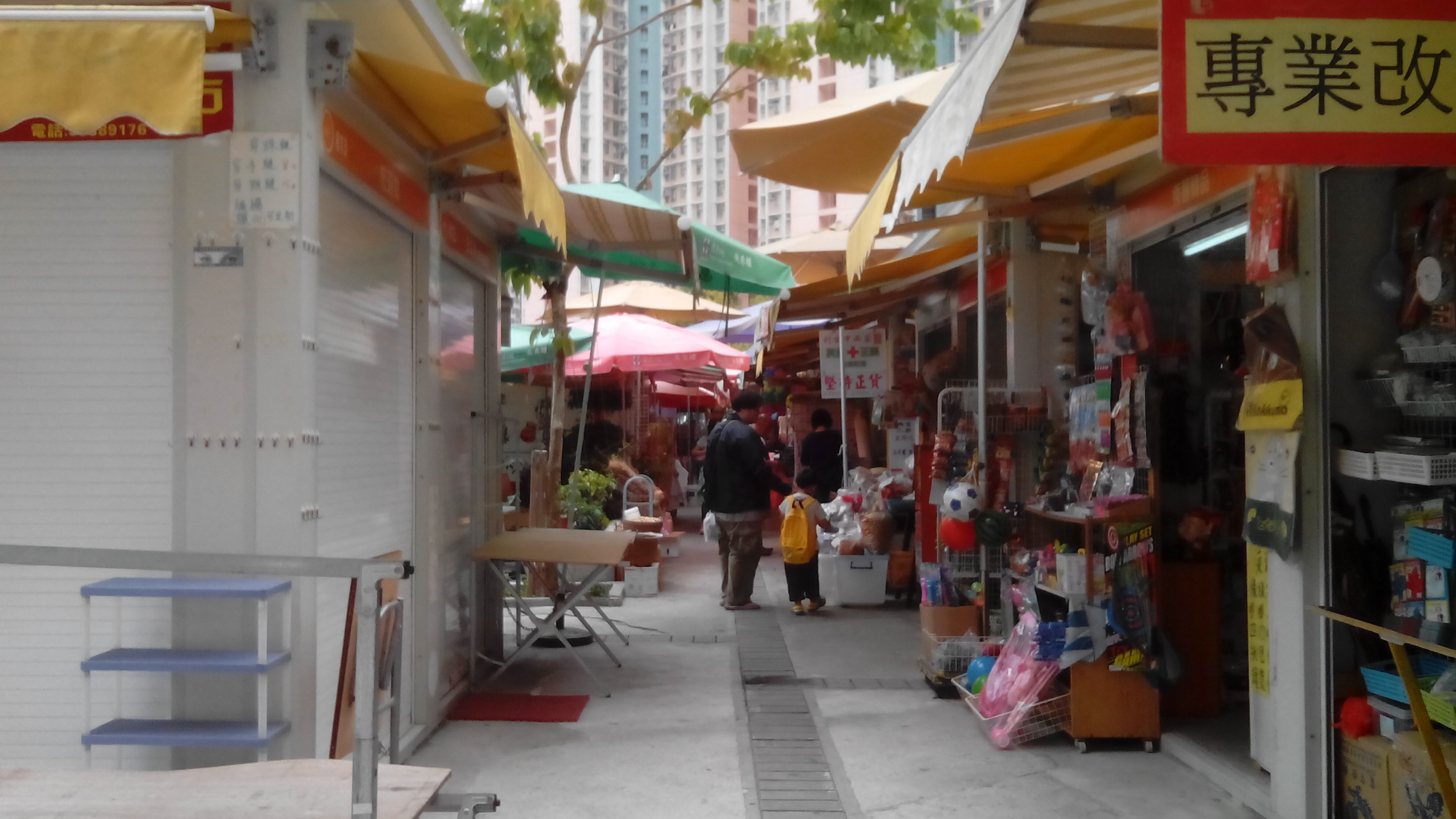
Tin Sau Bazaar, a local marketplace

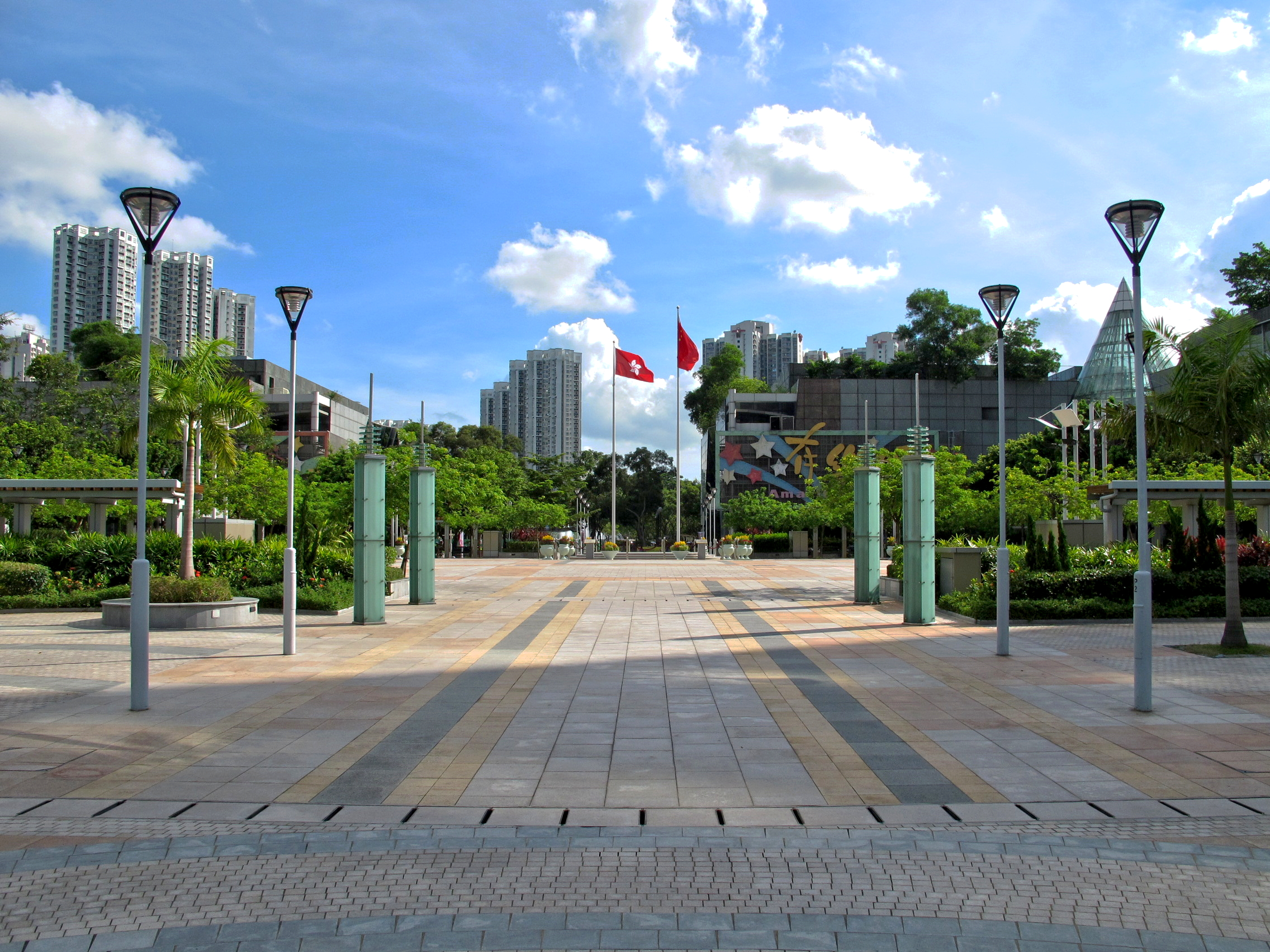
Tin Shui Wai Kingswood Plaza

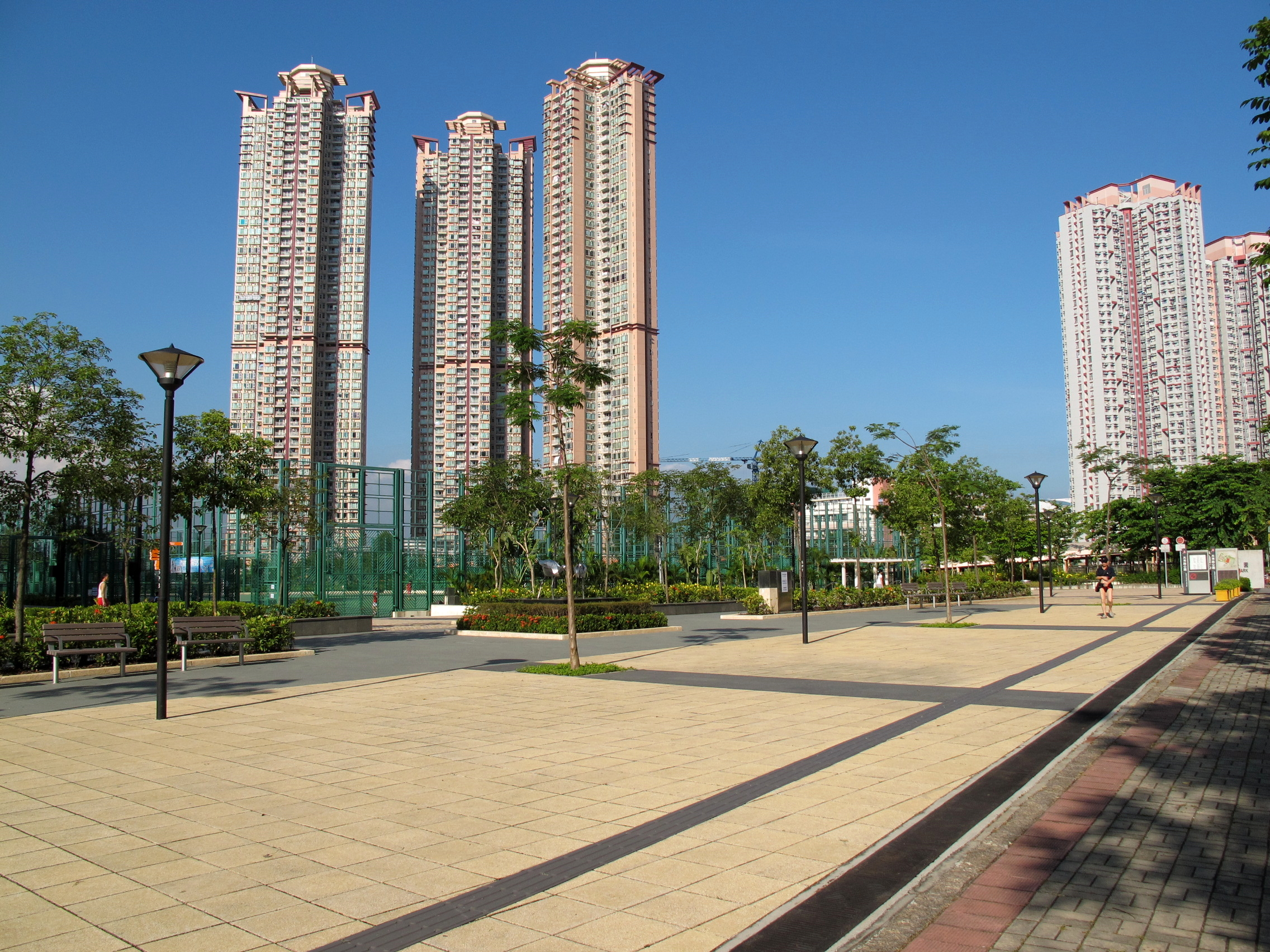
Tin Sau Road Park

The new town is centred on the Tin Shui Wai Park, which offers many gardens and activities.

The Tin Sau Bazaar is a marketplace in the northern part of the town managed by the charity organisation Tung Wah Group of Hospitals.

Parts of Tin Shui Wai have a picturesque and tranquil environment. The Hong Kong Wetland Park, demonstrating the diversity of Hong Kong's wetland ecosystem, is located in Tin Shui Wai.

The light rail routes 705 and 706 stop at Wetland Park stop.

== Public facilities ==
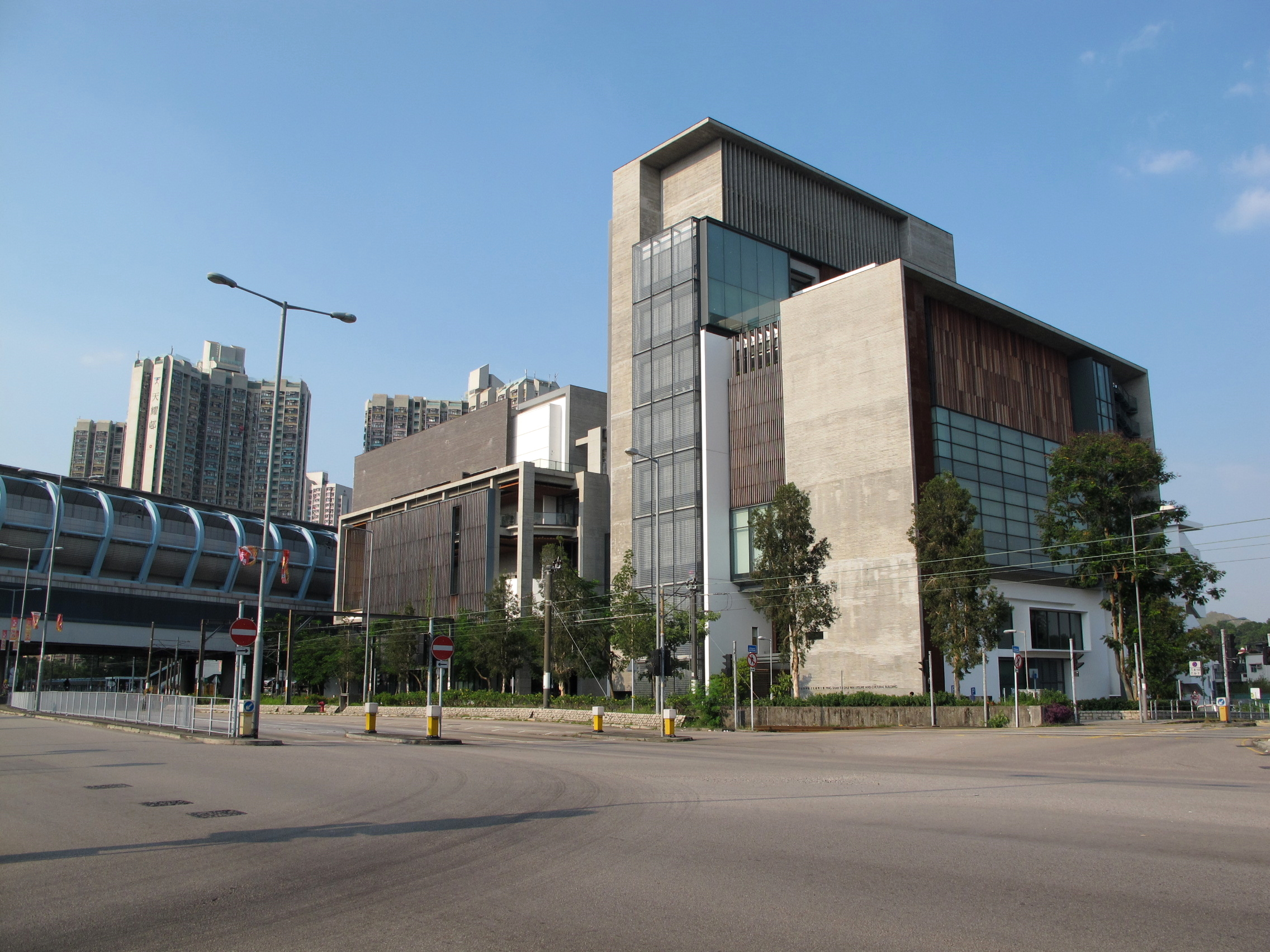
Ping Shan Tin Shui Wai Public Library

=== Culture and leisure ===
Tin Shui Wai has two public libraries. Ping Shan Tin Shui Wai Public Library is in the south, directly beside the railway station. It opened in 2013 and is the second-largest public library in Hong Kong, behind the Hong Kong Central Library. Tin Shui Wai North Public Library is small, at Tin Chak Estate in the north of the town.

The town has three public swimming pools: the Tin Shui Wai Swimming Pool (opened 1994), the Ping Shan Tin Shui Wai Swimming Pool (opened 2011) and the Tin Sau Road Swimming Pool (opened 2025). Since the opening of the new pool, the facilities are no longer overcrowded.

The largest sports ground is the Tin Shui Wai Sports Ground, a stadium with a capacity of 2,500 spectators. It also has a 400-metre running track. There are other football and rugby pitches at Tin Sau Road Park and Tin Yip Road Park in the northern part of the town.

There are four indoor sports centres in Tin Shui Wai. They are Tin Shui Wai Sports Centre, Tin Shui Sports Centre, Tin Fai Sports Centre and Ping Shan Tin Shui Wai Sports Centre. There is an outdoor sports area in Tin Sau Road for volleyball, basketball and football court.

=== Medicine ===
After years of planning, the Tin Shui Wai Hospital opened in January 2017. The hospital's Accident and Emergency Department opened in March 2017 on a part-time basis. Smaller public medical facilities include the Tin Shui Wai Health Centre and the Tin Shui Wai (Tin Yip Road) Community Health Centre, in the south and north of the town respectively.

== Housing ==
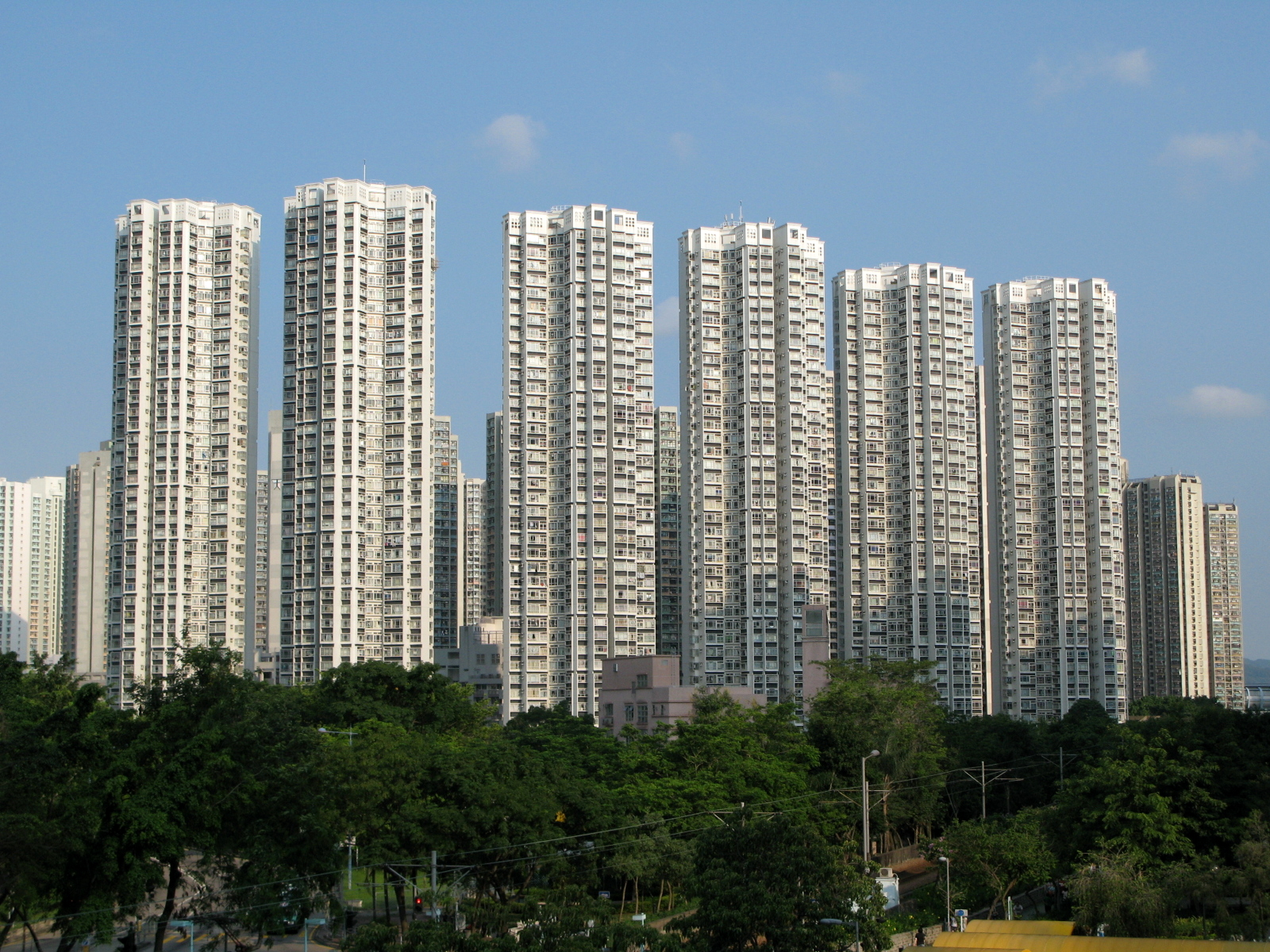
Sherwood Court

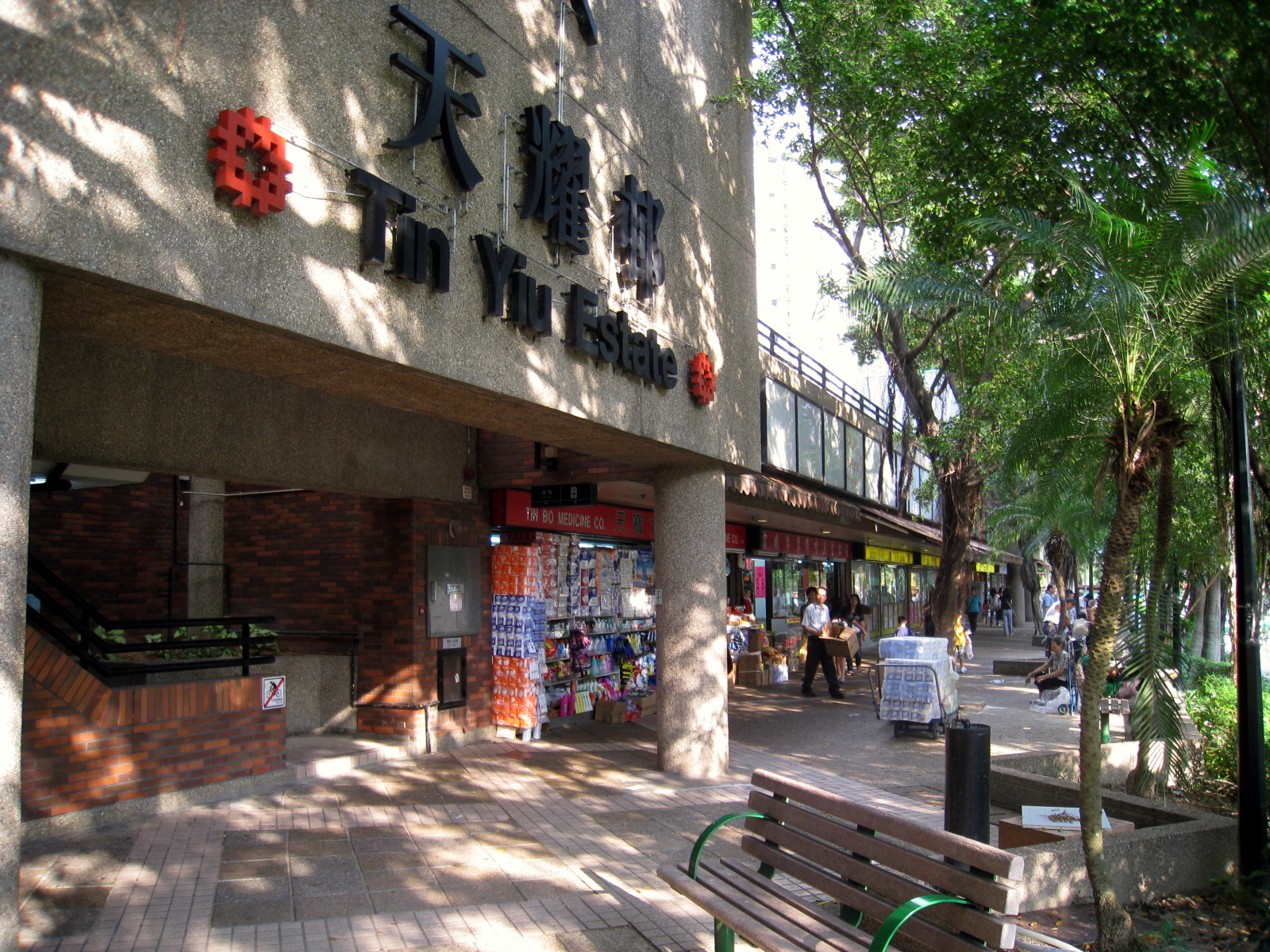
Tin Yiu Estate shops

The main residences of Tin Shui Wai are the public housing estates , the 58 residential blocks of Kingswood Villas and Wetland Seasons Park and Bay.

=== Public estates ===
- Grandeur Terrace (俊宏軒)
- Tin Chak Estate (天澤邨)
- Tin Ching Estate (天晴邨)
- Tin Heng Estate (天恆邨)
- Tin Shui (I) Estate (天瑞（一）邨)
- Tin Shui (II) Estate (天瑞（二）邨)
- Tin Tsz Estate (天慈邨)
- Tin Wah Estate (天華邨)
- Tin Yan Estate (天恩邨)
- Tin Yat Estate (天逸邨)
- Tin Yiu (I) Estate (天耀（一）邨)
- Tin Yiu (II) Estate (天耀（二）邨)
- Tin Yuet Estate (天悅邨)

=== Home Ownership Scheme estates ===
- Tin Chung Court (天頌苑)
- Tin Fu Court (天富苑)
- Tin Oi Court (天愛苑)
- Tin Lai Court (天麗苑)
- Tin Shing Court (天盛苑)
- Tin Yau Court (天祐苑)

=== Private housing estates ===
- Central Park Towers (柏慧豪園)
- Kingswood Villas (嘉湖山莊) — one of the largest private housing estates in Hong Kong
  - Chestwood Court (翠湖居)
  - Kenswood Court (景湖居)
  - Maywood Court (美湖居)
  - Lynwood Court (麗湖居)
  - Sherwood Court (賞湖居)
  - Locwood Court (樂湖居)
- Vianni Cove (慧景軒)
- Wetland Seasons Park
- Wetland Seasons Bay
- Yoho West

== Education ==
=== Primary and secondary schools ===
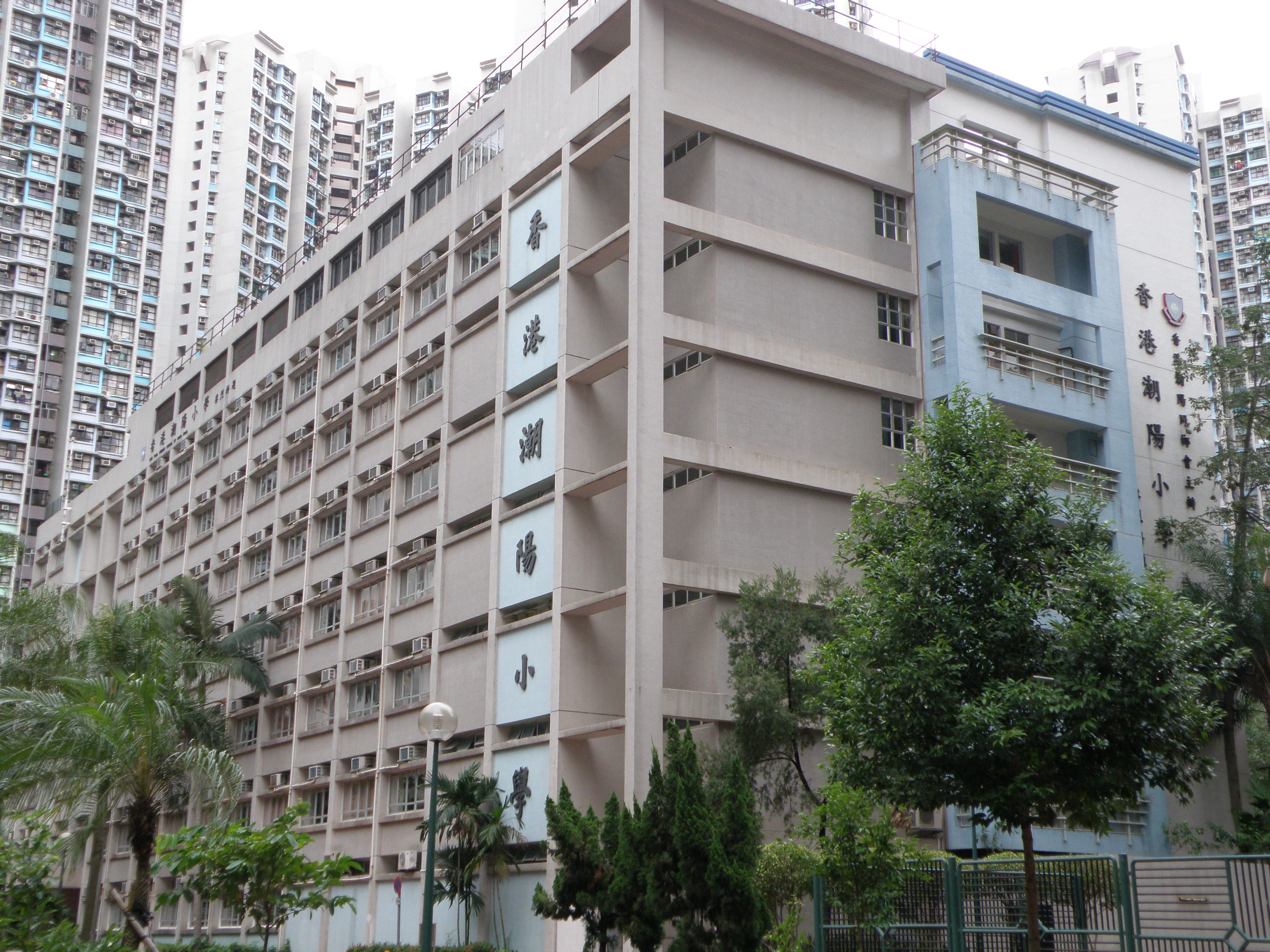
Chiu Yang Primary School

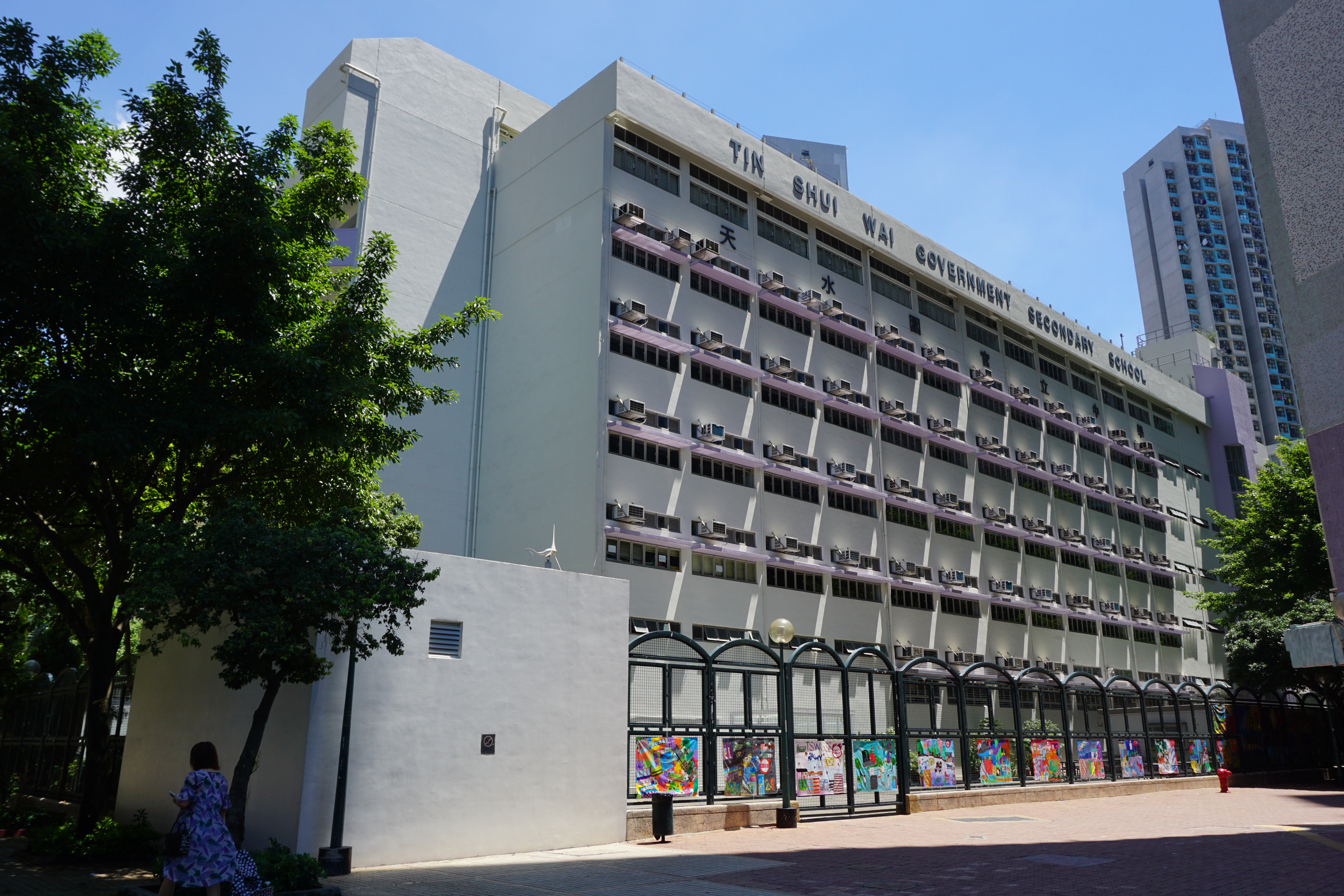
Tin Shui Wai Government Secondary School

Tin Shui Wai is in Primary One Admission (POA) School Net 72. Within the school net are multiple aided schools (operated independently but funded with government money) and one government school: Tin Shui Wai Government Primary School (天水圍官立小學).

Schools in Tin Shui Wai:

- Primary schools
  - Buddhist TCFS Yeung Yat Lam Memorial School — special-needs school for intellectual disability
  - Caritas Lok Kan School — special-needs school for intellectual disability
  - CCC Fong Yun Wah School
  - Chinese YMCA Primary School
  - Christian Alliance S. Y. Yeh Memorial Primary School
  - Chiu Yang Por Yen Primary School
  - Chiu Yang Primary School of Hong Kong
  - C.P.C. Yao Dao Primary School
  - Cumberland Presbyterian Church Yao Dao Primary School
  - Gigamind English Primary School
  - Ho Ming Primary School (Sponsored by Sik Sik Yuen)
  - Hong Kong Student Aid Society Primary School
  - Lee Shau Kee Primary School
  - Ling Oi Primary School
  - Lions Club International Ho Tak Sum Primary School
  - Lok Sin Tong Leung Kau Kui Primary School
  - Lok Sin Tong Leung Kau Kui Primary School (Branch)
  - Methodist Primary School
  - Queen Elizabeth School Old Students' Association Primary School
  - Queen Elizabeth School Old Students' Association Branch Primary School
  - Shap Pat Heung Rural Committee Kung Yik She Primary School
  - Shun Tak Fraternal Association Wu Mien Tuen Primary School
  - Tin Shui Wai Catholic Primary School
  - Tin Shui Wai Government Primary School
  - TWGH Leo Tung-hai Lee Primary School
  - TWGH Yiu Dak Chi Memorial Primary School
  - W F Joseph Lee Primary School
  - Ying Yip Primary School
  - Xianggang Putonghua Yanxishe Primary School of Science And Creativity
- Secondary schools
  - Buddhist Mau Fung Memorial College
  - Caritas Lok Kan School
  - CCC Fong Yun Wah Secondary School
  - Chinese YMCA Secondary School
  - CUHK FAA Thomas Cheung Secondary School
  - HKFYG Lee Shau Kee College
  - Hong Kong Management Association K S Lo College
  - Jockey Club Eduyoung College
  - Ju Ching Chu Secondary School (Yuen Long)
  - Kung Yik She Secondary School
  - MFBM Chan Lui Chung Tak Memorial College
  - Pak Kau College
  - Pui Shing Catholic Secondary School
  - Queen Elizabeth School Old Students' Association Secondary School
  - Queen Elizabeth School Old Students' Association Tong Kwok Wah Secondary School
  - Shap Pat Heung Rural Committee Kung Yik She Secondary School
  - Shun Tak Fraternal Association Yung Yau College
  - Tin Shui Wai Government Secondary School
  - Tin Shui Wai Heung To Middle School
  - Tin Shui Wai Methodist College
  - YLPMSAA Tang Siu Tong Secondary School
  - Yuen Long Lutheran Secondary School
- Vocational education
  - Youth College Tin Shui Wai campus

=== Public libraries ===
Hong Kong Public Libraries operates the Tin Shui Wai North Public Library in the Tin Chak Estate, and the Ping Shan Tin Shui Wai Public Library in the Ping Shan Tin Shui Wai Leisure and Cultural Building.

== Transport ==
=== Commuter railway ===
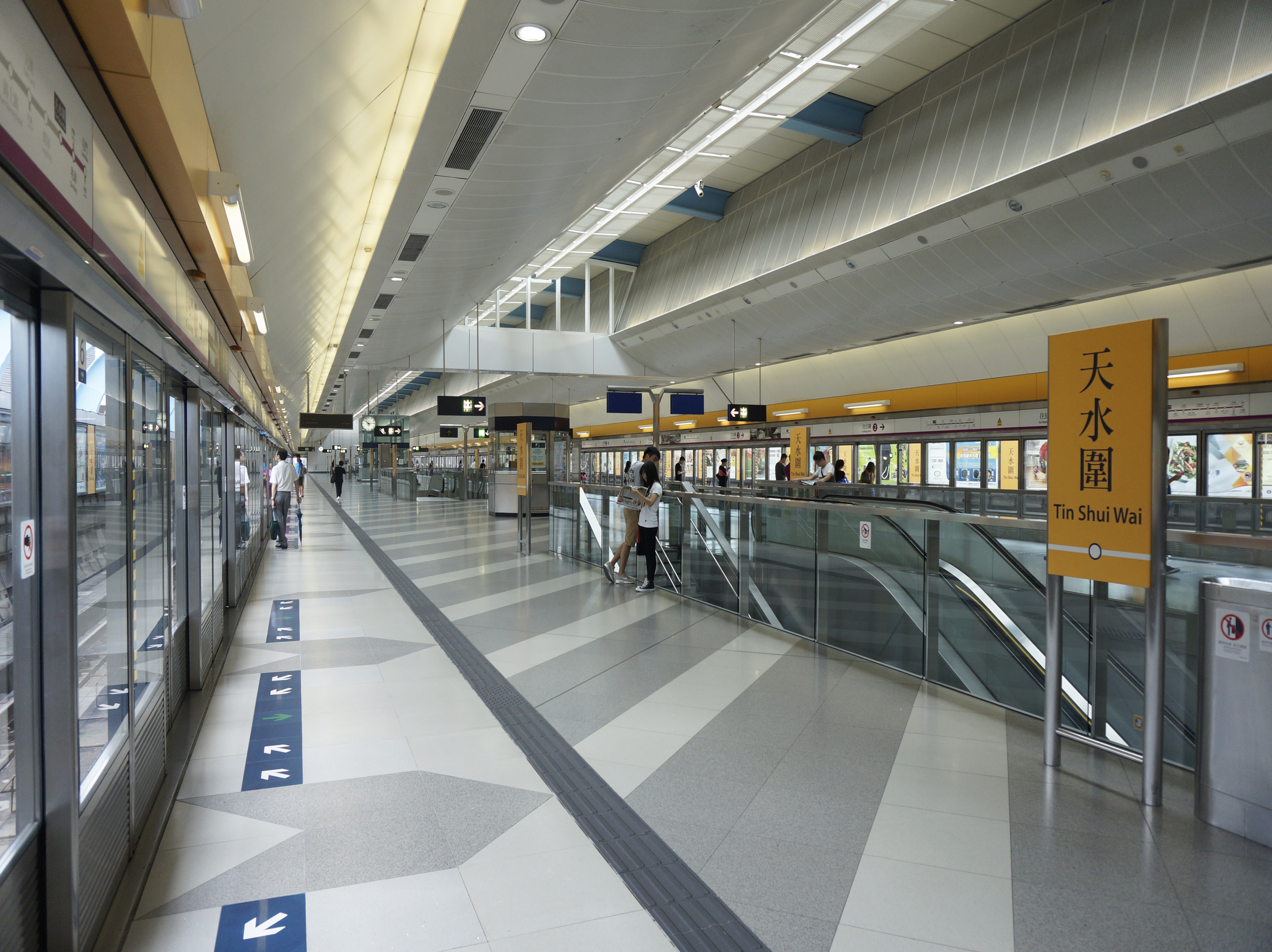
Tin Shui Wai station platform

The town is served by Tin Shui Wai station on the Tuen Ma line. The station borders the south of the town, near Ping Shan, and is adjacent to Tin Yiu Estate, Tin Shing Court and Tin Yau Court. It is elevated over the junction of Ping Ha Road and Tin Fuk Road. Many bus stops serve the station. Three footbridges are constructed along Tin Fuk Road and Ping Ha Road to connect the station to the town.

The Tuen Ma line directly connects Tin Shui Wai to the neighbouring new towns of Tuen Mun and Yuen Long, as well as Tsuen Wan , Kowloon and East New Territories via the 5.5 kilometre Tai Lam Tunnel.

The entrances/exits of the station are:

- A: Public transport interchange, Hang Mei Tsuen
- B: Tin Shing Court, Tin Shui Wai Police Station
- C: Tin Yiu Light Rail stop, Tin Yiu Estate
- D: Tin Yau Court, Tin Tsz Estate
- E1: Tin Shui Wai Light Rail stop (Platform 1)
- E2: Tin Shui Wai Light Rail stop (Platform 2)
- E3: Tin Shui Wai Light Rail stop (Platform 3), Pagoda, Ping Shan Heritage Trail, Sheung Cheung Wai

=== Light railway ===
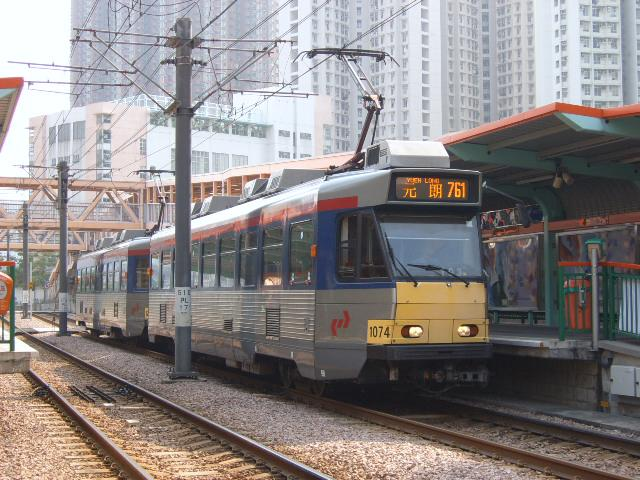
A light rail vehicle at Tin Yuet stop

The district is also served by the Light Rail, with Tin Shui Wai station serving as the main interchange point for the local branch of this network, which runs in a circle around the new town, called Tin Shui Wai Circular. The light rail network, in conjunction with the Tuen Ma line, connects the townships of Tuen Mun and Yuen Long. The light rail is divided into fare zones 1, 2, 3, 4, 5, and 5A. All of Tin Shui Wai's 16 light rail stops fall in zones 4 and 5A.

The Tin Shui Wai stop of the Light Rail network belongs to Zone 4 for single-ride ticket. It is underneath the Tuen Ma line station at ground level. Platforms 1, 2 and 3 can be reached by escalators at West Rail exits E1, E2 and E3, respectively.

==== Routes ====
Route	Destination	Tin Shui Wai station platform
705	Tin Shui Wai Circular (Anti-clockwise)	1
706	Tin Shui Wai Circular (Clockwise)	3
751	Yau Oi	3
751	Tin Yat	2

=== Bus and road ===
A well-developed bus network is an important transport element in Tin Shui Wai, with buses running to most major destinations in Hong Kong.

Main roads connecting the township to surrounding areas are Ping Ha Road, Tin Ha Road, Long Tin Road, Yuen Long Highway and Tin Wah Road (to Lau Fau Shan).

== In popular culture ==
Two 2008 Hong Kong films were set in Tin Shui Wai: The Way We Are, directed by Ann Hui and Besieged City directed by Lawrence Ah Mon. The 2009 Ann Hui film Night and Fog is also set there.

A 2020 Cantonese hip-hop song 'Tin Shui Wai Gang Gang' by TomFatKi and Billy Choi had 5 million views on Youtube. They performed a clean version at Chill Club Awards on ViuTV in 2022.

A 2020 Hong Kong drama We are the Littles by ViuTV starring Stephy Tang, Zeno Koo, Ian Chan and Anson Lo was set in Tin Shui Wai.

== Gallery ==
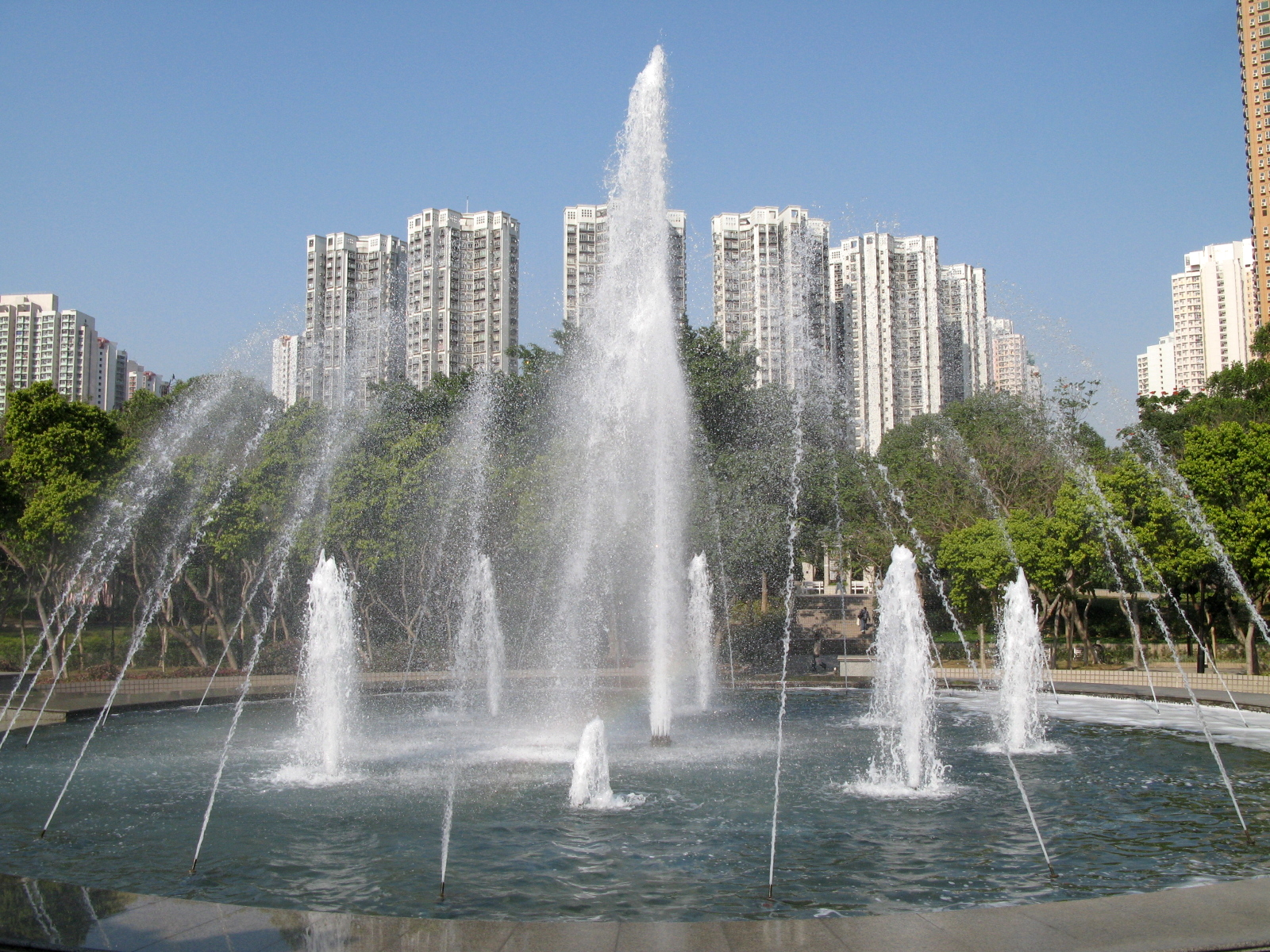
Tin Shui Wai Park

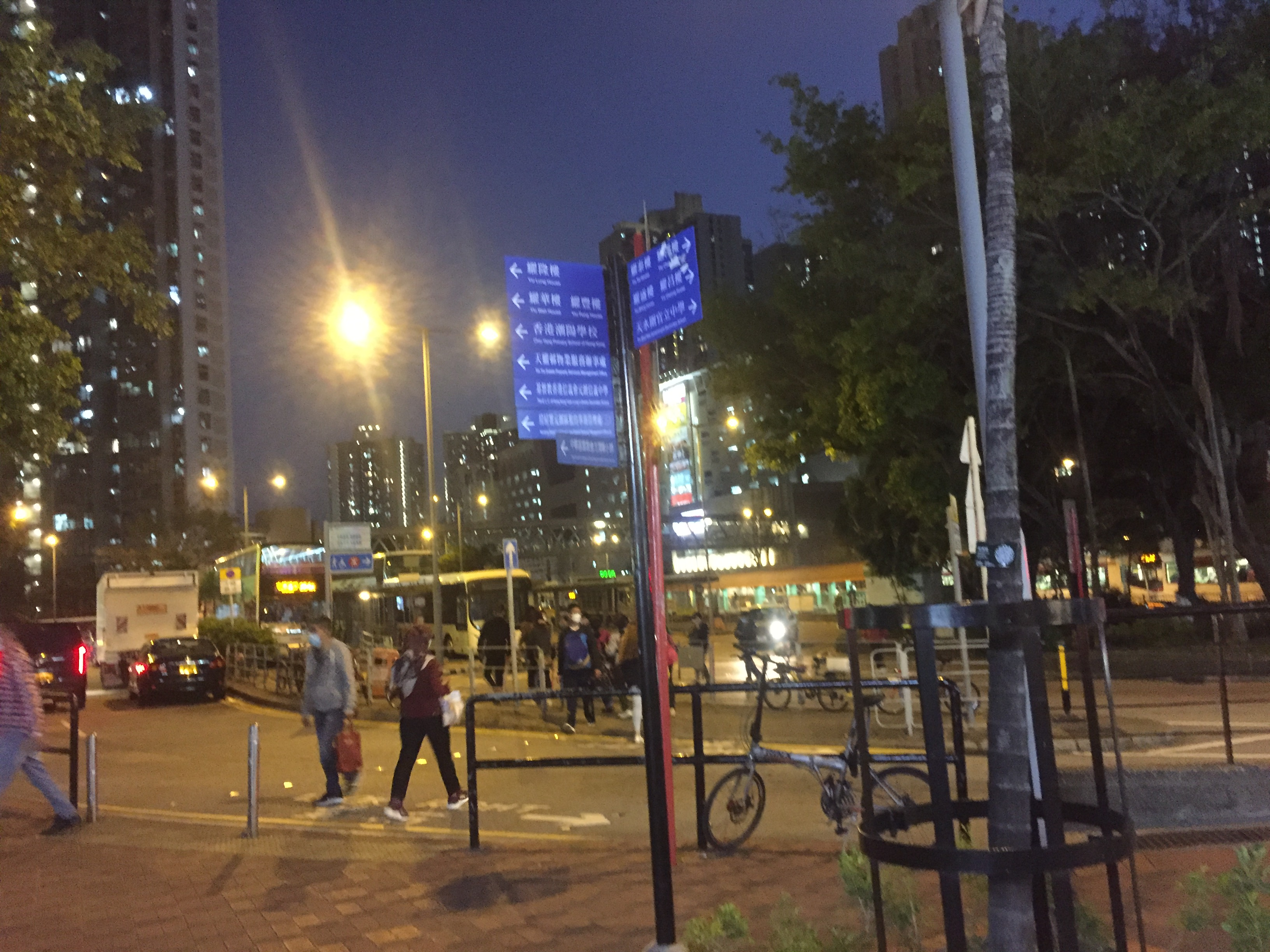
Tin Yiu Road

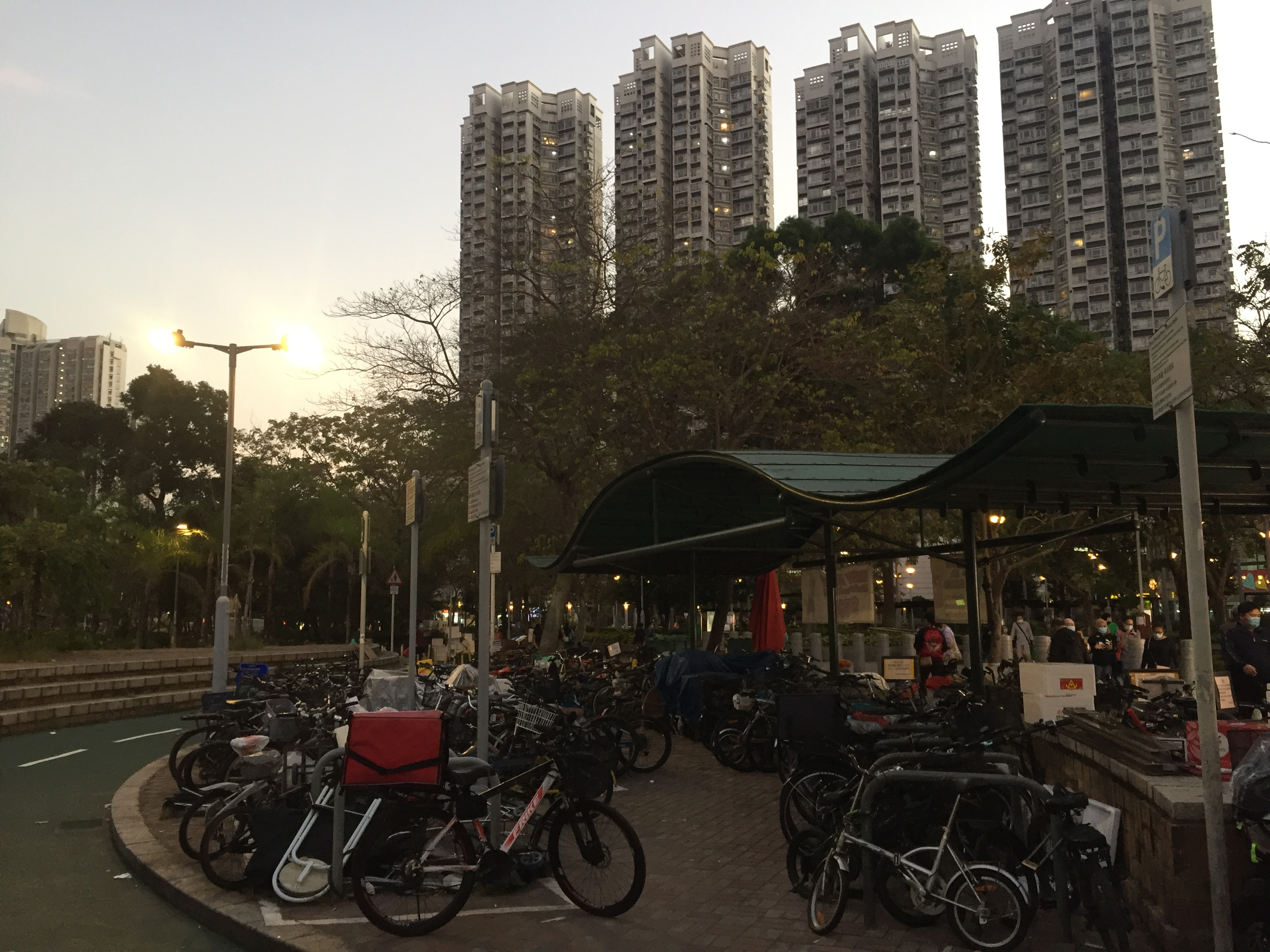
Kingswood Villas

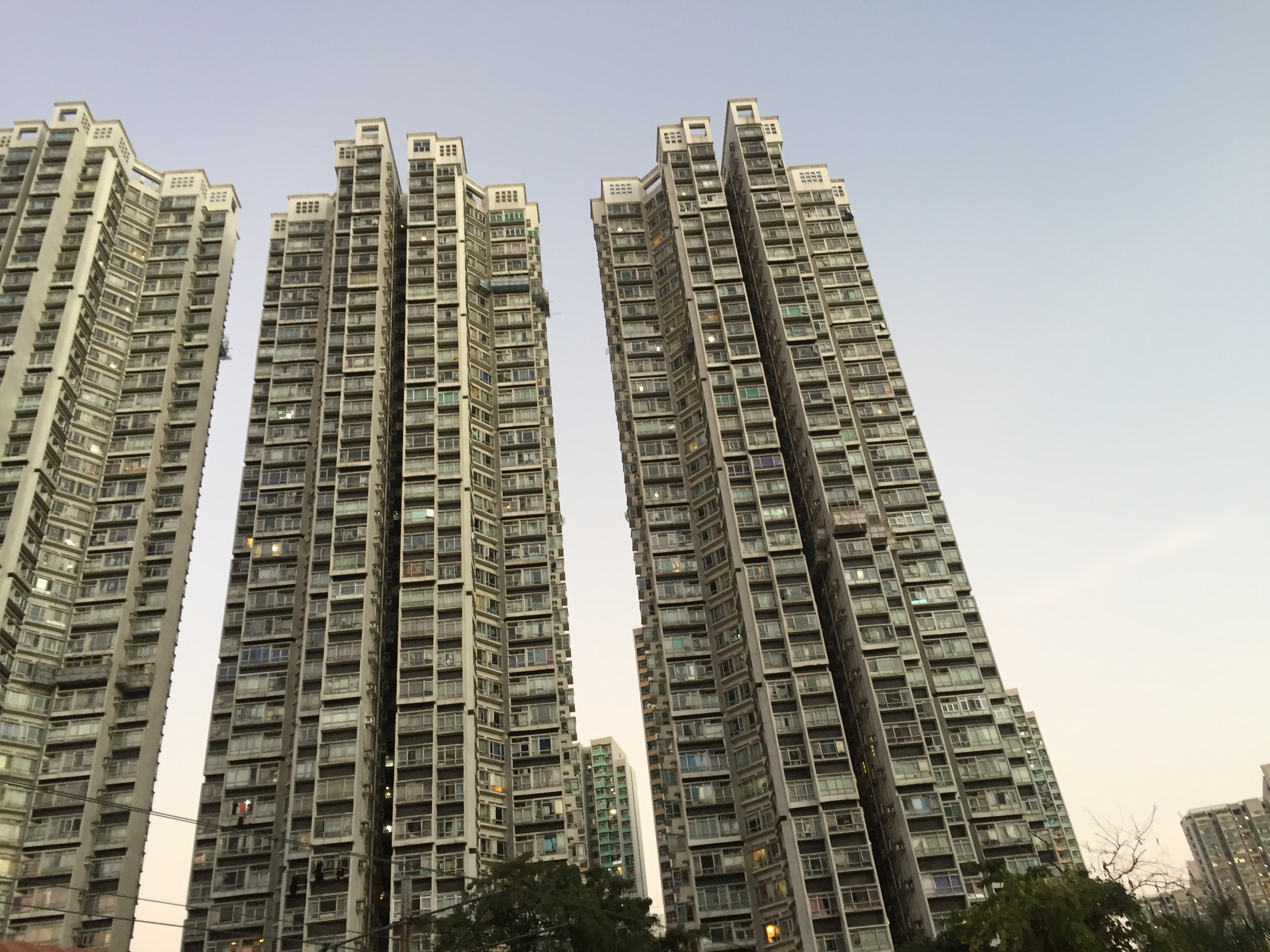
Kingswood Villas Locwood Courts

== See also ==
- Hung Shui Kiu
- List of places in Hong Kong
- Tin Shui Wai New Force — a political group with a focus on Tin Shui Wai
- Wetlands of Hong Kong
