= Tin Shui Wai Government Secondary School =

Secondary school in Tin Shui Wai, Hong Kong

Coordinates: 22.452422°N 114.004403°E

Tin Shui Wai Government Secondary School (TSWGSS) 天水圍官立中學 (天官)
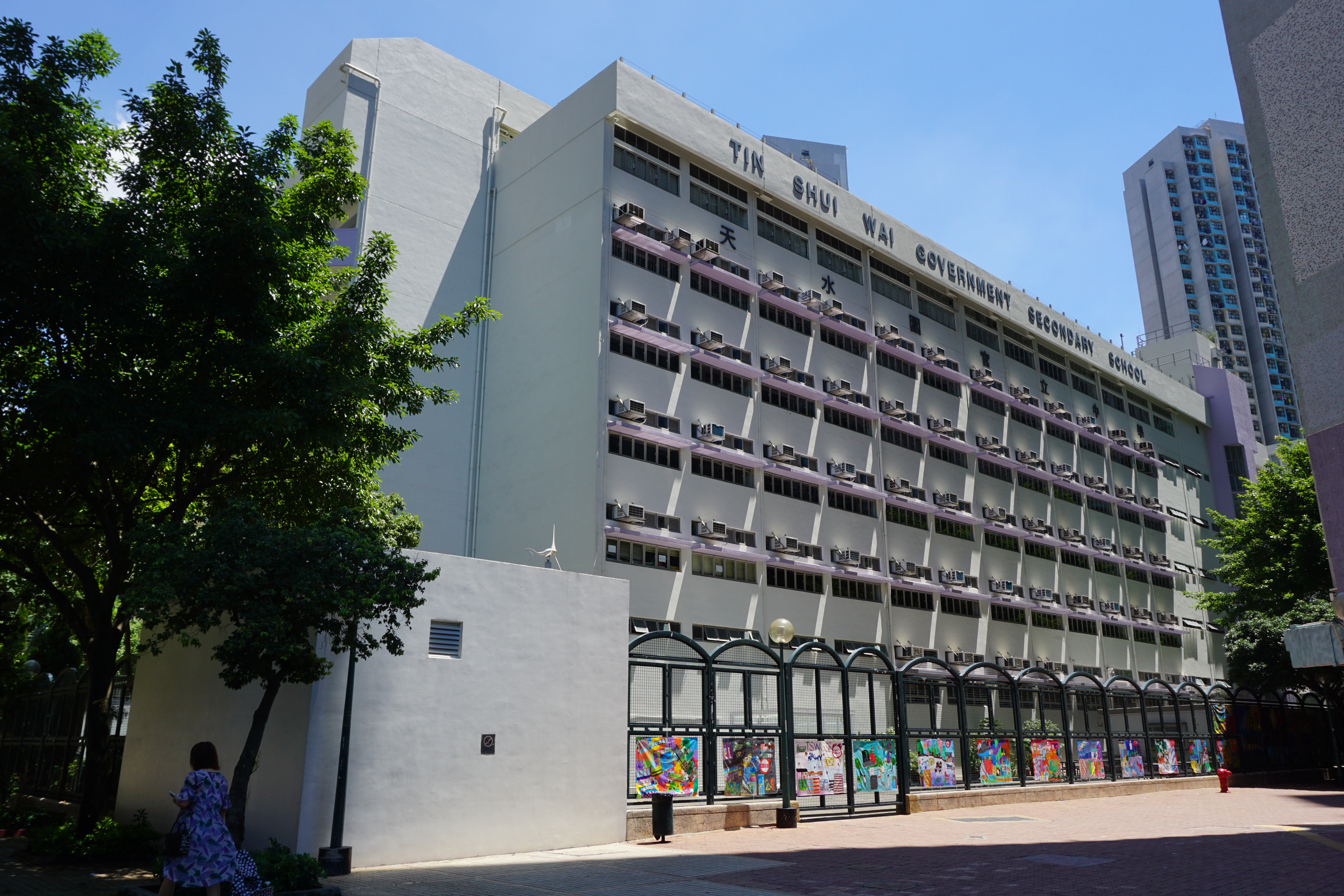
- Tin Shui Wai Government Secondary School
- Phase II Tin Yiu Estate, Tin Shui Wai, Yuen Long New Territories

Information
- Type: Government
- Established: 1990
- School district: Yuen Long District
- Principal: Kwok Kin Wa
- Staff: 60
- Enrollment: 1,100
- Language: Chinese
- Area: approx. 5,400 Sq. M
- Houses: Jupiter, Mars, Mercury, Venus
- Affiliation: Government
- Website: tswgss.edu.hk

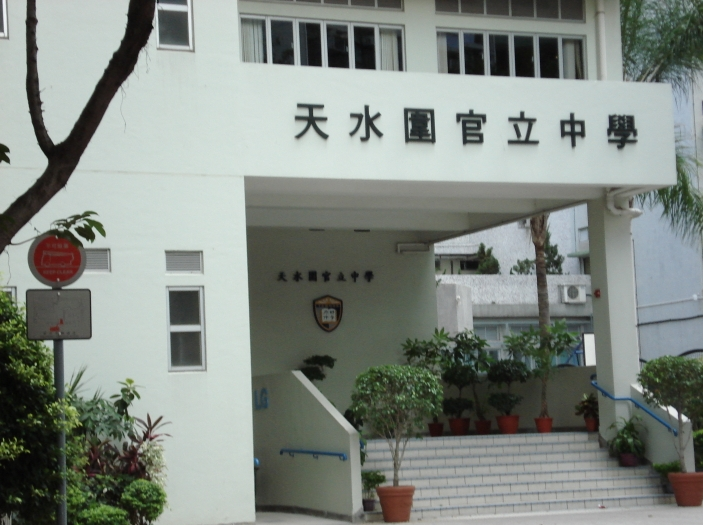
Tin Shui Wai Government Secondary School

Tin Shui Wai Government Secondary School or TSWGSS was established in 1990. It is located in Tin Yiu Estate in Tin Shui Wai, a part of Hong Kong. Having adopted the policy of inclusive education, it is a co-educational grammar school. TSWGSS is a nominated secondary school of Tin Shui Wai Government Primary School.

TSWGSS was first built in Au Tau in Yuen Long in 1990. It has moved to Tin Shui Wai since 1992. Medium of instruction in junior forms had been switched from English to Chinese starting from September 1998. The TSWGSS campus is next to Yuen Long Lutheran Secondary School, which shares the same location in parts of TSWGSS.
