= Church of Christ in China Kei Long College =

Subsidized school in Hong Kong

Coordinates: 22.441301°N 114.034374°E

The Church of Christ in China Kei Long College
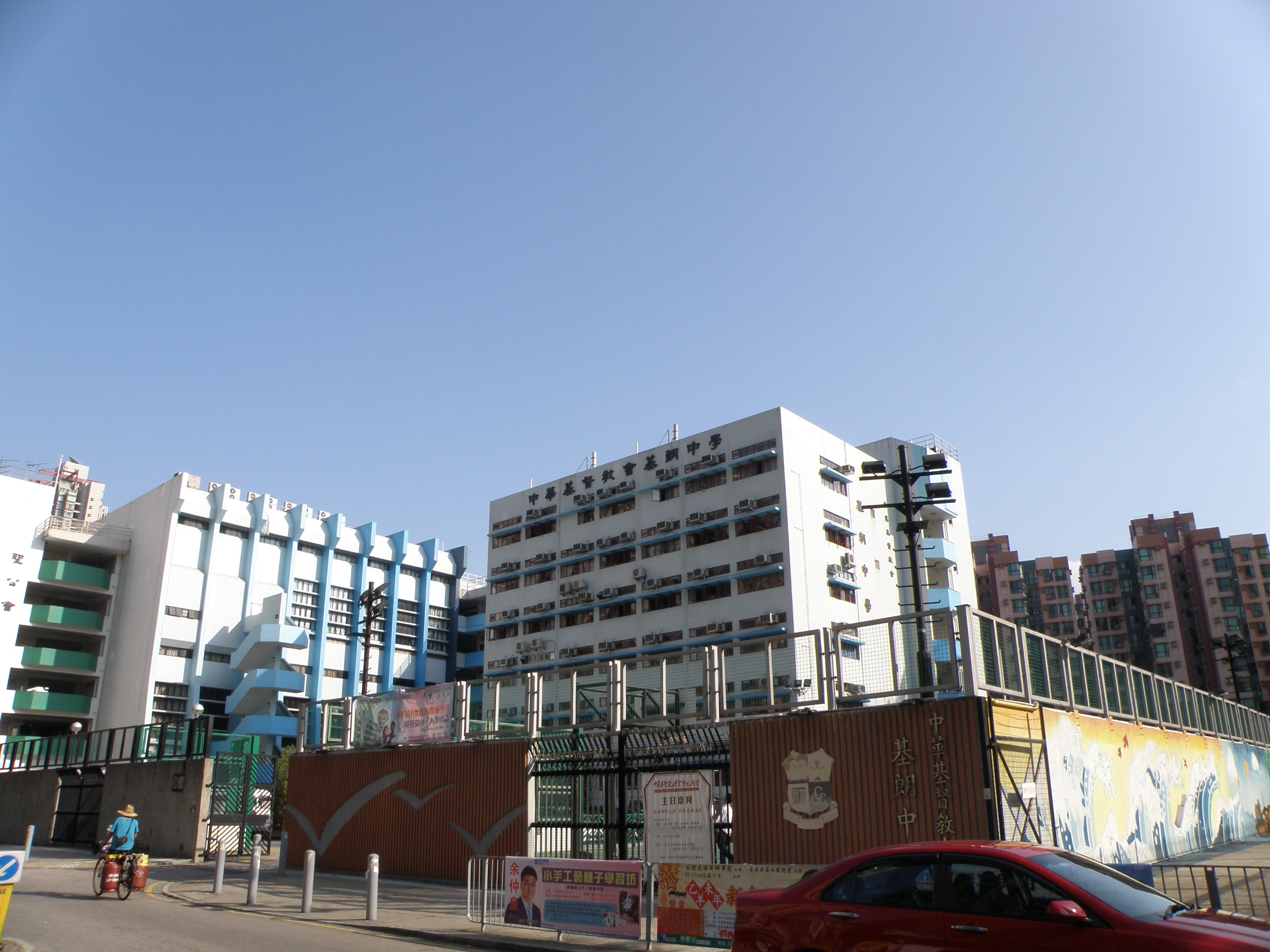
- CCC Kei Long College in Yuen Long, Hong Kong.
- 8 Fung Yau St South, Yuen Long, New Territories, Hong Kong

Information
- Type: Subsidized grammar school (co-educational)
- Established: 1982
- Principal: 曾頴基
- Faith: Christianity
- Forms: Form One to Form Six
- Website: http://www.keilong.edu.hk/

The Church of Christ in China Kei Long College (CCCKLC, Chinese: 中華基督教會基朗中學), is a co-educational subsidized secondary school located in Hong Kong. It was founded in 1982.

A part of the school campus is shared with SKH Bishop Baker Secondary School (Chinese: 聖公會白約翰會督中學). CCCKLC and CCC Kei Yuen College (Chinese: 中華基督教會基元中學) are sister schools.

The school organizer, the Hong Kong Council of the Church of Christ in China, aims at witnessing for Christ in Yuen Long.

Some subjects, such as mathematics and Integrated Science, are taught in English as the medium of instruction in the junior forms.
