= HKFYG Lee Shau Kee College =

Secondary school in Tin Shui Wai, Hong Kong

Coordinates: 22.462687°N 114.004566°E

Hong Kong Federation of Youth Groups Lee Shau Kee College
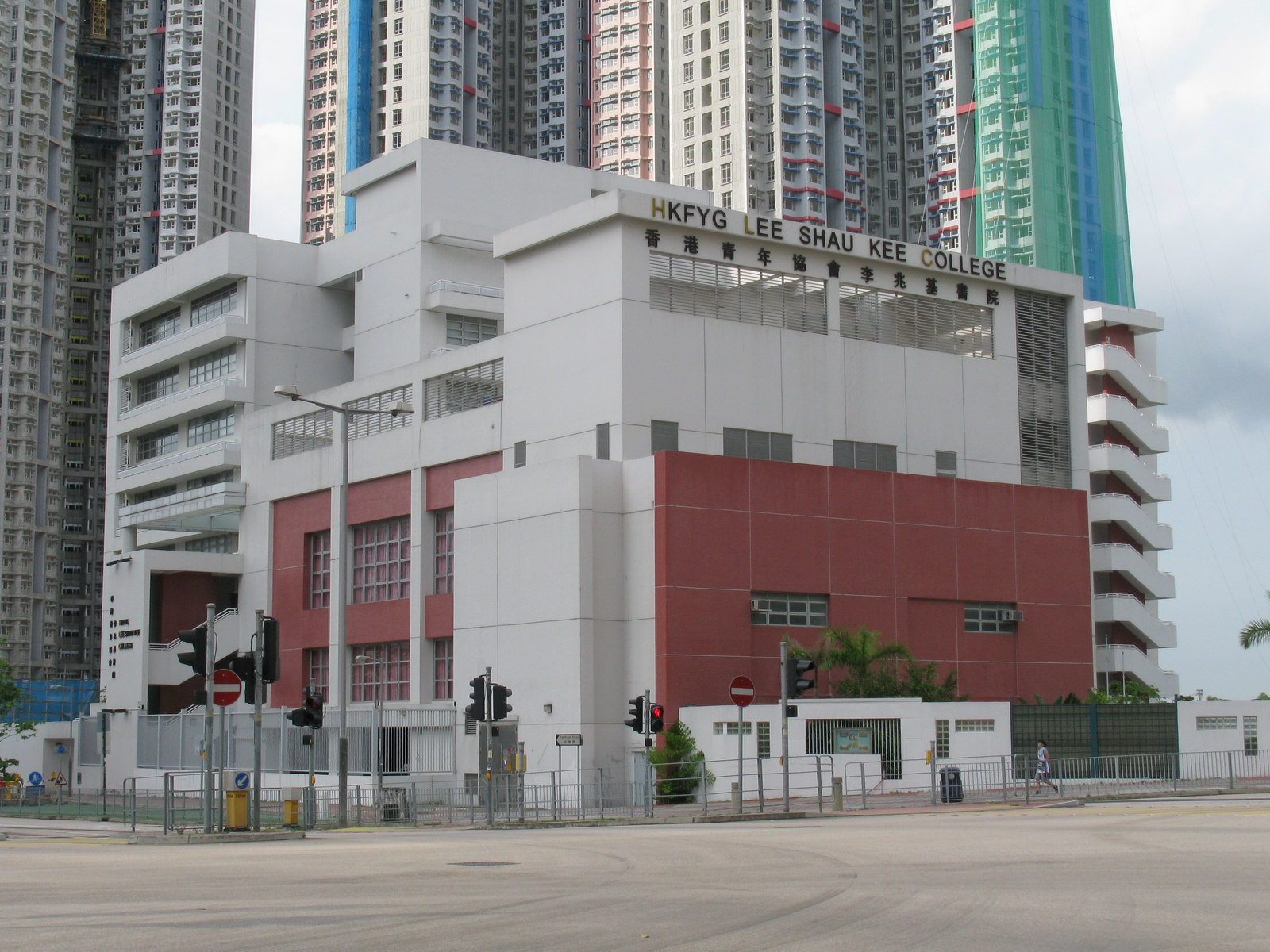

Location
- 12 Tin Kwai Road, Tin Shui Wai, Yuen Long, N.T.

Information
- Other name: 香港青年協會李兆基書院
- Type: Direct Subsidy Scheme
- Motto: Wisdom in Action
- Established: 2006; 20 years ago
- School district: Tin Shui Wai, Yuen Long District, New Territories
- Principal: Mr Lin Chun-pong
- Staff: 74
- Grades: Secondary 1 to Secondary 6
- Language: English
- Houses: Probity, Rationality, Sagacity, Acuity
- Color: Orange
- Affiliation: HKFYG (Sponsoring Body)
- Website: hlc.edu.hk

The HKFYG Lee Shau Kee College (Chinese: 香港青年協會李兆基書院) is a Hong Kong Band 1 Secondary School located in Tin Shui Wai, New Territories. Founded in 2006, it is the second school in Tin Shui Wai sponsored by HKFYG and funded by Lee Shau-kee, the first being the HKFYG Lee Shau Kee Primary School.

== Motto ==
Wisdom in Action and 3-S, Self-directed learning, Self-discipline and Self-efficacy

== Class structure & Size ==
From Secondary 1 to Secondary 6, there would be 1 streams for each level, with no more than 1 students per class. Under the New Senior Secondary curriculum, students would be grouped according to their choice of elective subjects.

== Curriculum ==
The school follows the local six-year secondary school system in an English medium. For Form 1 to Form 3 students, The following subject would be offered:

- Chinese Language
- English Language
- Mathematics
- Integrated Science
- Biology
- Chemistry
- Physics
- Integrated Humanities (To be cancelled in 2019–20)
- Economics
- History
- Geography
- Computer Literacy
- Visual Arts
- Music
- Physical & Health Education (PHE)

For Form 4 to Form 6 students, the school follows the New Senior Secondary Curriculum. All students take 4 compulsory subjects:

- Chinese Language
- English Language
- Mathematics (Compulsory Part)
- Citizenship and Social Development

Plus 2 to 3 elective subjects from the following options:

- Chinese Literature
- Literature in English
- Chinese History
- History
- Geography
- Economics
- Tourism & Hospitality Studies
- Business, Accounting & Financial Studies
- Information & Communication Technology
- Physics
- Chemistry
- Biology
- Visual Arts
- Music
- Physical Education

Note: Mathematics (Extended Module) is also offered but it is not counted as an elective subject.

Visual Arts, Music and PHE classes would be part of the school curriculum.

== Principals ==
- 1. POON Chun Kau, Henry [2006-2012]
- 2. LEE Pak Lan [2012-2018]
- 3. LIN Chun Pong [2018- ongoing]
