= Vocational university =

Degree-granting applied professional education institution

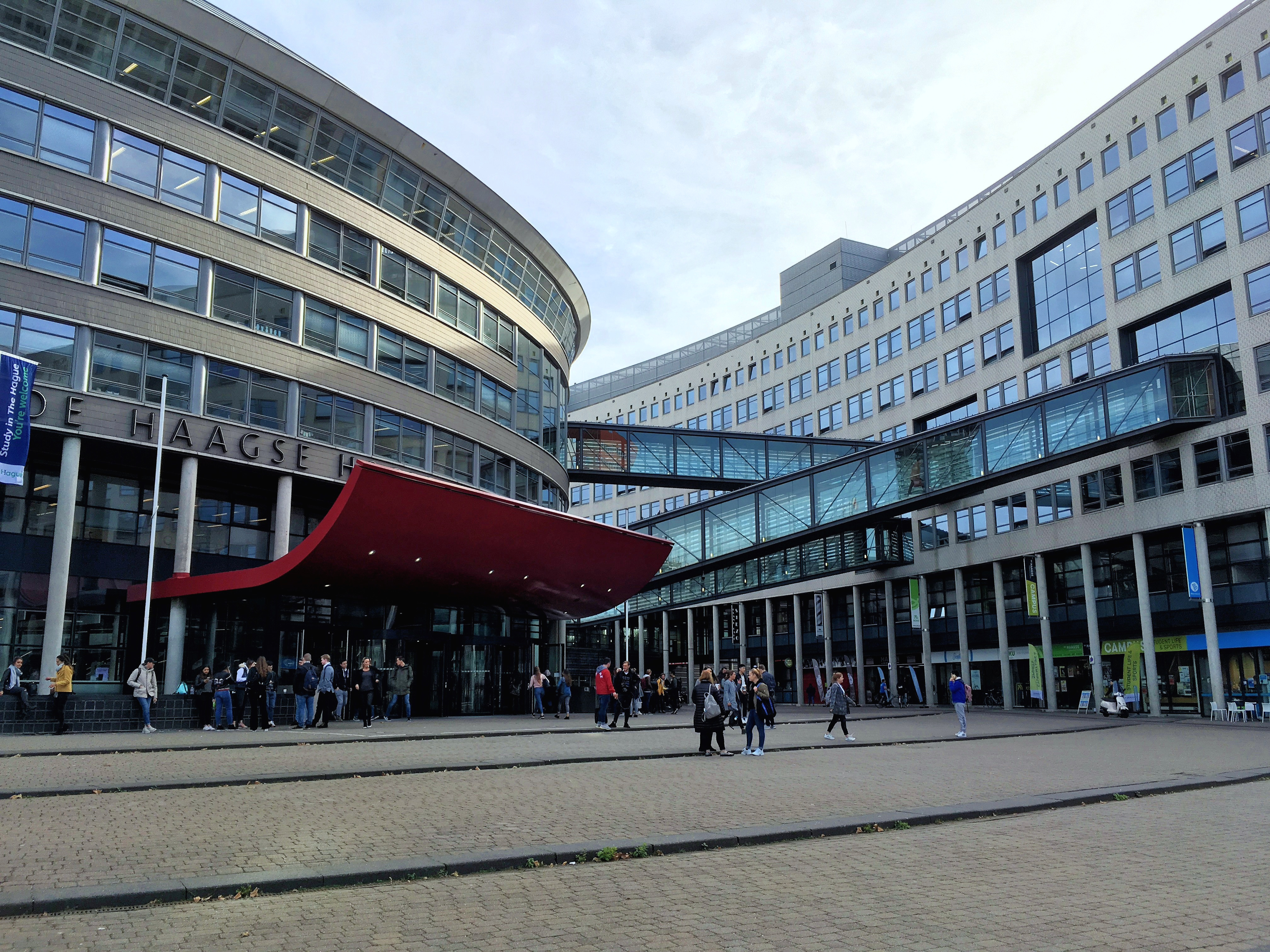
Building of The Hague University of Applied Sciences

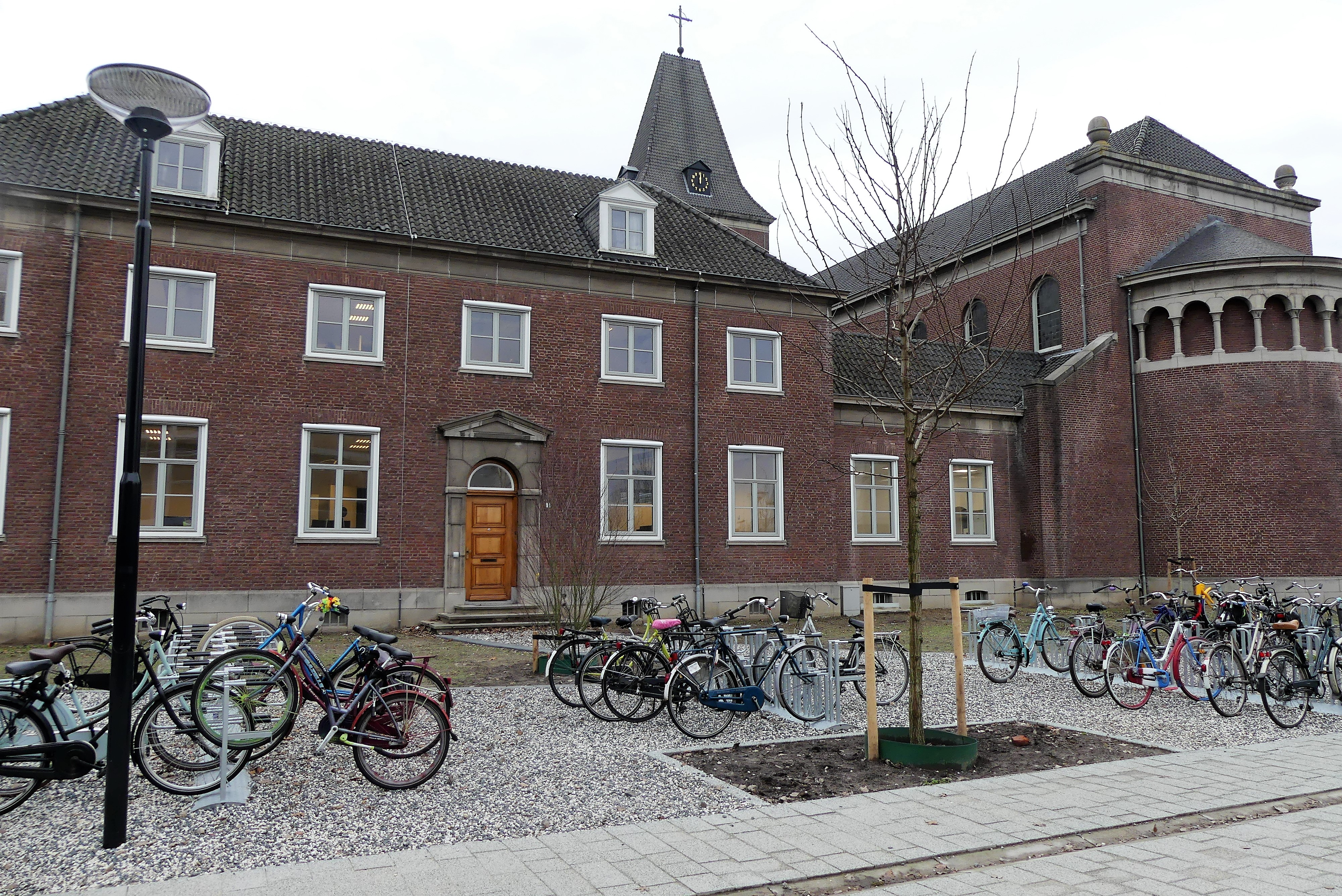
Building of Breda University of Applied Sciences

A vocational university or university of applied sciences (UAS), less commonly called a polytechnic university is an institution of higher education and increasingly research that provides applied professional education and grants academic degrees. It should not be confused with vocational schools or technical schools that do not meet the strict standards of higher education nor have the ability to grant officially accredited academic degrees.

In some countries, a vocational university more precisely grants professional degrees like professional bachelor's degree, professional master's degree and professional doctorates. The term is not officially used in many countries, and an assignment to a certain type of university in a certain country's educational system is therefore difficult. The UK once had a very extensive vocational university sector with its polytechnic system dating back to the mid-19th century. Vocational universities are often regulated and funded differently (for example, by the local government rather than the state) from research-focused universities, and the degrees granted are not necessarily interchangeable.

== Education ==
The education at vocational universities combines teaching of both practical skills and theoretical expertise. It can be contrasted with education in a usually broader scientific field, which may concentrate on theory and abstract conceptual knowledge. There is also the historical background that an educational institution was called a university in the Middle Ages only if a certain classical canon of subjects was taught (typically including philosophy, medicine and theology). In modern times, other subjects, namely natural and engineering sciences, became more important, but institutions of tertiary education focusing on these subjects and not offering the classical canon have been until recently or are still denied the prestigious denomination "university" in all countries. They had to use other, more general terms (which in many languages are false friends of the English term "high school", sometimes with modifiers), including Fachhochschule in German, Haute École in French (Belgium and Switzerland), Hogeschool in Dutch, Høyskole in Norwegian, Scuola universitaria professionale in Italian, etc.

There are different varieties, including vocational universities of applied sciences (also named polytechnics or institutes of technology), vocational universities of liberal arts, etc. In recent years, many vocational universities have received full university status, such as the University of Music and Performing Arts Vienna, Austria (Universität für Musik und darstellende Kunst Wien, formerly Hochschule für Musik und Darstellende Kunst Wien), or the Örebro University, Sweden (formerly Örebro Högskola). There are also some establishments which now have full university status but continue to use their former names, such as the Royal Institute of Technology in Stockholm, Sweden.

== In Europe ==
=== Austria ===
The Austrian government decided to establish Fachhochschulen (FH) in 1990. In the academic year of 2010/11, there were twenty-one institutions officially considered as Fachhochschulen plus a number of other providers of Fachhochschulstudiengängen with a total of over 27,000 students. About a third of the 136 Fachhochschulstudiengänge are organized as part-time courses of studies.

=== Finland ===
In Finland, vocational universities are called Ammattikorkeakoulu (Yrkeshögskola in Swedish, translated "university of applied sciences", literally "vocational institution of higher education"). They focus on vocational education and do not grant licentiate or doctorate degrees.

Certain universities are called korkeakoulu because they effectively have only one faculty, e.g. Teatterikorkeakoulu, the Theatre Academy, whereas universities with several faculties are called yliopisto. The term ammattikorkeakoulu (AMK) creates some confusion with korkeakoulu, because traditionally AMK's were not considered universities. A graduate of university of applied sciences (ammattikorkeakoulu) is eligible for doctoral studies in Finnish universities (yliopisto).

=== France ===
In France, the term "Grande École" is much more prestigious than "university". A "Grande École" is one of the types of higher education institution that can be similar to vocational universities, along with Universities of Technology (UTs) and National Polytechnic Institutes (INPs). According to Campus France, the government agency responsible for promoting French higher education abroad, the grandes écoles represent "the French culture of excellence", while the universities offer higher education to all.

=== Germany ===
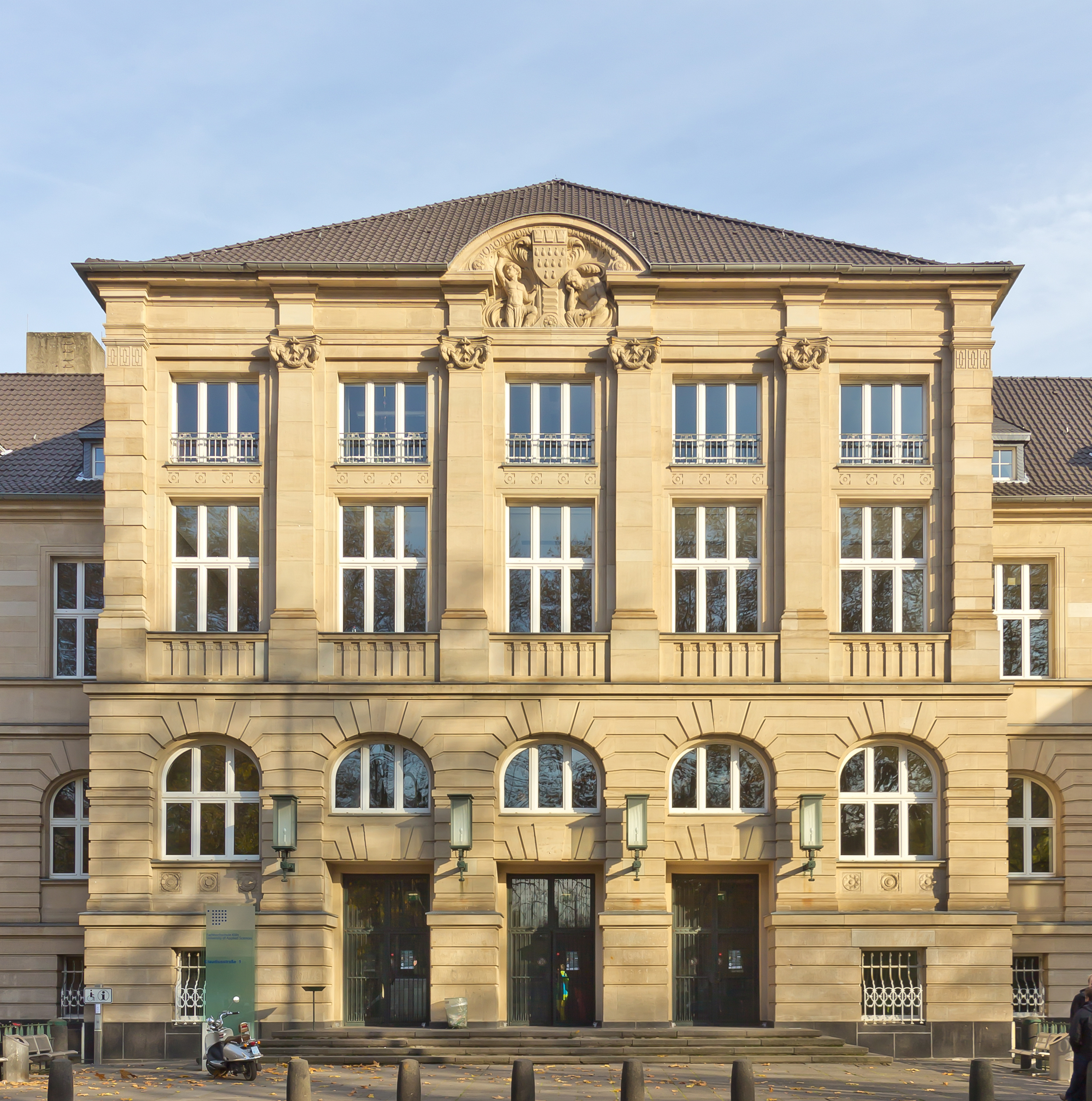
Building of Cologne University of Applied Sciences

The Fachhochschule (German: [ˈfaxhoːxʃuːlə]; plural Fachhochschulen; translated "university of applied sciences"), abbreviated FH, is the German model for vocational universities. Within the German higher education system, they offer academic degree programs with an emphasis on practical and professional applications. Fachhochschulen offer degrees in many many applied sciences and arts, such as engineering, technology, business, architecture, design, and industrial design. An increasing number of Fachhochschulen are abbreviated as Hochschule, the generic term in Germany for institutions awarding academic degrees in higher education, or expanded as Hochschule für angewandte Wissenschaften (HAW), the German translation of "universities of applied sciences", which were primarily designed with a focus on teaching professional skills. This is reflected in the fact that the ratio of the number of students to the number of professors is significantly better than at traditional universities. However, there are also a number of subjects, such as social work or the legal sub-discipline of social law, which are traditionally underrepresented at traditional universities. In these areas, universities of applied sciences make a significant contribution to research. UAS professors are also increasingly attracting national and international third-party funding. It differs from the traditional university (Universität) mainly through its more practical orientation. Subjects taught at Fachhochschulen include engineering, computer science, business and management, arts and design, communication studies, social service, and other professional fields.

In terms of student numbers, universities of applied sciences are on average smaller than traditional universities. However, there are also a number of HAW, such as TH Köln or UAS Frankfurt, which can keep up with large universities in this respect.

Fachhochschulen do not award doctoral degrees themselves but sometimes in cooperation with award-granting partner universities. In the meantime, however, some professors at HAW also have additional habilitations and can therefore directly supervise doctoral students at their home university. This and the rule that they give priority to hiring professors with a professional career of at least three years outside the university system additional to the doctoral degree are the two major ways in which they differ from traditional universities.

The traditional degree awarded at a Fachhochschule was the Diplom (FH). Coursework generally totaled six semesters (three years) of full-time study, with various options for specialization. In addition, there were one or two practical training semesters to provide hands-on experience in real working environments. The program concluded, usually after 3.5 – 4 years, with the final examination and a thesis (Diplomarbeit) which is usually an extensive project on a current practical or scientific aspect of the profession. In an effort to make educational degrees more compatible within Europe, the German Diplom degrees were mostly phased out by 2010 and replaced by the European bachelor's and master's degree.

The Fachhochschule represents a close relationship between higher education and the employment system. Their practical orientation makes them very attractive to employers.

Today, Fachhochschulen also conduct research. Research projects are either publicly funded or sponsored by industry. Nevertheless, in Germany the right to confer doctoral degrees is still generally reserved to Universitäten. In 2016, however, Fulda University of Applied Sciences became the first Fachhochschule to be conferred this right for its graduate center for social sciences. Several Fachhochschulen run doctoral programs where the degree itself is awarded by a partner university in Germany or abroad (similar to the doctoral programs in German research institutes, such as the Fraunhofer Society or the Max Planck Society).

There are a few universities, such as the Catholic University of Eichstätt-Ingolstadt and the University of the Bundeswehr Munich, which run Fachhochschule courses in addition to their normal courses. It is also important to note that in the 1990s, some universities of applied sciences were developed from former GDR universities with the right to award doctoral and post-doctoral degrees in order to cut costs. These include, for example, the Zittau/Görlitz University of Applied Sciences and the Leipzig University of Applied Sciences (HTWK Leipzig). In these institutions, the classic university spirit lives on to this day.

==== Impact of the Bologna process ====
Due to the Bologna process, universities and Fachhochschulen award legally equivalent bachelor's and master's degrees. Excepting research-intensive institutions in Hesse, Saxony Anhalt, Baden-Württemberg, North Rhine-Westphalia and Bavaria

Due to the Bologna process, most German Universitäten and Fachhochschulen have ceased admitting students to programs leading to the traditional German Diplom (FH), but now apply the new degree standard of Bachelor's and Master's degrees. In line with the Bologna process, bachelor's and master's degrees awarded by both types of universities (Universitäten and Fachhochschulen) are legally equivalent.

With a Master's from either, one can now enter a doctoral degree program at a Universität, but a graduate with a bachelor's degree from either is normally unable to proceed directly to a doctoral degree program in Germany. Also, with the master's degree of either of the institutions a graduate can enter the höheren Dienst (higher service) career for civil servants.

==== Berufsakademie ====
Berufsakademie is a college type strongly inspired by the dual education system. A Berufsakademie is called a university of cooperative education in English and only grants bachelor's degrees. This type of institution was first created in the German state of Baden-Württemberg and now exists in Hamburg, Hesse, Lower Saxony, Saarland, Saxony, Schleswig-Holstein, and Thuringia, but not in the other German states. In 2009, Baden-Württemberg transformed its Berufsakademie into a new type of institution, which until now only exists in that state, a "Duale Hochschule". In English, this type of institution is also called university of cooperative education, but a Duale Hochschule also offers master's degrees.

=== Greece ===
In Greece, comparable institutions to the vocational universities (or perhaps better to the universities of applied sciences) are the technological educational institutes (TEIs). These constitute part and parcel of the higher education in Greece and offer in their own capacity bachelor's and master's degrees, and soon doctorate degrees.

On the other hand, the term college in Greece may refer, among others, to the institutions that are officially titled Centres of Post-lyceum (secondary) Education. These have a solely professional, i.e. non-academic, orientation according to existing Greek law, and are so far only private. However, they run in collaboration with foreign authorities, such as universities and accreditation organisations, that may recognise them academically. They may offer professional bachelor's degrees of minimum three years, as well as master's and doctorate degrees.

=== Italy ===
An Istituto tecnico superiore (abbreviated ITS – Higher Technical Institute) is an Italian tertiary educational institution. They were established in 2008, and are modelled on the Fachhochschule system of Germany. Programs have a duration of two or three years, and require a high school degree for access.

=== Lithuania ===
College (kolegija) is the traditional term to refer to vocational education, however usage of Universitu of Applied Sciences, or even College of Applied Sciences is becoming more common in modern times, especially when promoting for foreign students. Most of institutions are relatively new, established between 2000 and 2002. Since 2006, they award professional bachelor's degrees. Reforms introduced by the Šimonytė Cabinet in the 2020s led to the first wave of consolidation within the sector and a refined focus on its objectives.

=== Netherlands ===
As of January 29, 2008, a Dutch hogeschool (HBO) may call itself a "university of applied sciences" in English. Just like the German Fachhochschule, these HBO institutes firstly have a practical profile. They focus primarily on teaching the practicing of a profession at the highest professional level and applied scientific research, at the state of the art. This as opposed to research universities (Dutch: "universiteiten"), that focus on professional practice and theoretical research. This so-called binary system of professional and academic education co-exists with upper secondary vocational education, which provides vocational education at EQF levels 1-4 for equal, similar or different professions.

Universities of applied sciences offer associate degrees, bachelor's degrees and master's degrees "BaMa". From 2022 onward there will be pilots on Professional Doctorates. Hogescholen in the Netherlands have been provided with the right to conduct research by the revised Higher Education and Research Act (WHOO) 2010.

Examples:

- HAN University of Applied Sciences (Arnhem and Nijmegen)
- Hanze University of Applied Sciences (Groningen)
- The Hague University of Applied Sciences

=== Sweden ===
The main difference between universities (universitet) and vocational universities (högskola, official translation university college) is that only the former ones have the right to award doctorate degrees in all subjects they offer. Some vocational universities have been given such rights within limited areas of research.

=== Switzerland ===
Swiss law calls Fachhochschulen and universities "separate but equal". The Swiss Universities of Applied Sciences UAS are vocational universities established in Switzerland in 1995 following the model of the German Fachhochschulen. They are called Fachhochschule in German, Haute école specialisée in French and scuola universitaria professionale (SUP) in Italian. The Swiss Universities of Applied Sciences offer third level education, continuing education, services businesses and institutions, and produce applied research activities. In 2013 there are seven public UAS approved by the Swiss Federal Council in 1998 and two private UAS approved by the Federal Council in 2005 and 2008. The public UAS are run by one or more cantons.

UAS have the institutional mandate to provide degree programmes (Bachelor's degrees and Master's degrees), continuing education and training, to conduct applied research and to offer services to companies and institutions. Students with a finished apprenticeship and a Fachmatura (subject Matura) and students with the Matura and a practical year in a company can access further education within the Universities for Applied Science. The UAS and their Bachelor's and Master's degrees are federally accredited.

The Federal Department of Economic Affairs, Education and Research (EAER) and is in charge of the accreditation of the UAS which are requested to meet the federal legislative requirements. The UAS are supported by the cantons, the Federal Department of Economic Affairs, Education and Research (EAER), the State Secretariat for Education, Research and Innovation (SERI) and by the Rector's Conference of Swiss Universities (swissuniversities).

University of Applied Sciences	Typology	Establishment	Recognition	Note
Berner Fachhochschule (BFH)	Public		1998	
Fachhochschule Nordwestschweiz (FHNW)	Public		1998	
Haute école spécialisée de la Suisse occidentale (HES-SO)	Public		1998	
Hochschule Luzern (HSLU, formerly known as FHZ)	Public		1998	Not to be confused with University of Lucerne (unilu)
Ostschweizer Fachhochschulen (OST)	Public		1998	Until 2019 Fachhochschule Ostschweiz (FHO)
Scuola universitaria professionale della Svizzera italiana (SUPSI)	Public	1997	1998	
Zürcher Fachhochschule (ZFH)	Public		1998	
Kalaidos Fachhochschule	Private		2005	
Haute école spécialisée Les Roches-Gruyère	Private		2008	

== In Asia ==
=== Mainland China ===
China is home to the largest vocational education system in the world. In 2018, mainland China had a total of 1,418 vocational colleges.

Examples:

- Fashion Institute (Ningbo, Zhejiang)
- Hunan Mass Media Vocational and Technical College (Changsha, capital of Hunan)
- Hunan Chemical Vocational Technology College (Zhuzhou, Hunan)
- Hunan Railway Professional Technology College (Zhuzhou, Hunan)
- Guangsha College of Applied Construction Technology (Zhejiang)
- Liming Vocational University (Quanzhou, Fujian)
- Qingdao Vocational and Technical College (Qingdao)
- Vocational Academy of Art (Zhejiang)
- Yuying College of Vocational Technology (Zhejiang)
- Zhejiang Vocational College of Economic & Trade (Zhejiang)
- Zibo Vocational Institute (Zibo, Shandong)
- Zhaoqing University (Zhaoqing, Guangdong)
- Suqian Economic and Trade Vocational College (Shuyang)

=== Hong Kong ===
- Vocational Training Council
  - Hong Kong Design Institute
  - Hong Kong Institute of Vocational Education
  - Hong Kong Institute of Information Technology
  - Technological and Higher Education Institute of Hong Kong
  - Chinese Culinary Institute
  - Hotel and Tourism Institute
  - International Culinary Institute
  - Maritime Services Training Institute

==== University of Applied Sciences status ====
In the 2023 Policy Address, the government facilitates the establishment of universities of applied sciences (UAS), and strive to raise the status of vocational and professional education and training to attain qualifications at university degree level, closely collaborating with technical professions and offer programmes with more internship and practical learning opportunities, to help students hone their practical skills in the fields. At 11 November 2024, the government launched the Alliance of Universities of Applied Sciences, comprising four post-secondary institutions as founding members, with the Hong Kong Metropolitan University and Saint Francis University as full members, and Tung Wah College and the Technological and Higher Education Institute of Hong Kong as associate members.

- Hong Kong Metropolitan University (HKMU), gained the status at 21 March 2024
- Saint Francis University (SFU), gained the status at 1 November 2024

=== Iran ===
==== University of Applied Science and Technology ====
The University of Applied Science and Technology (UAST) is a public university administrated by Ministry of Science, Research and Technology with various branches all over the provinces of Iran. This university helps to increase skill level of employed personnel in various sectors of economic field and graduates of higher education and professional skills that are lacking in administrative. It is an educational system inspired and derived from 'Community College' in the United States. With more than 1500 education center in all corner of Iran. UAST confers degrees in over 100 programs at the associate, bachelor's and master's degree levels.

==== Technical and Vocational University ====
The Technical and Vocational University (TVU) is one of Institutes of Higher Education under control of the Ministry of Science, Research and Technology. The university has more than 176 schools and colleges across the country and more than 220 thousand students is one of the largest universities in Iran.

=== Malaysia ===
There are five public vocational universities in Malaysia:

- Universiti Malaysia Pahang (UMP)
- Universiti Malaysia Perlis (UniMAP)
- Universiti Teknikal Malaysia Melaka (UTeM)
- Universiti Tun Hussein Onn Malaysia (UTHM)
- Universiti Malaysia Kelantan (UMK)

=== Sri Lanka ===
In 2009, the first University of Vocational Technology was established under the purview of the Ministry of Vocational and Technical Training. There are also nine College of Technology in Sri Lanka.

=== Taiwan ===
In Taiwan, vocational university is called University of science and technology or University of technology.

- National Taiwan University of Science and Technology (Taiwan Tech)
- National Taipei University of Technology (Taipei Tech)
- National Kaohsiung University of Science and Technology
- National Yunlin University of Science and Technology (Yen Tech)

== In Africa ==
=== Nigeria ===
In 2025, Nigeria had its first university of applied science opened, the Federal University of Applied Sciences Kachia (FUASK).

== See also ==
- Ammattikorkeakoulu
- Community college
- Education in Switzerland
- Further education
- Institute of technology
- Technical school
- Trade school
