= LRG =

LRG may refer to:

== Science and technology ==
- Locus Reference Genomic, DNA sequence format
- Luminous red galaxy in the Sloan Digital Sky Survey

== Education ==
- LRG University of Applied Sciences, Switzerland

== Companies and organisations ==
- Land Rover Group, a former division of auto manufacturer British Leyland and later the Rover Group
- Lifted Research Group, a clothing manufacturer
- Limited Run Games
- LRG Capital Funds
- LRG Capital Group
- LRG Racing
- Ludlow Research Group

== Other ==
- Lairg railway station, Scotland, by National Rail code
- Littoral Response Group, an amphibious task group of the Royal Navy
