= Lawrence R. Goldfarb =

Lawrence Goldfarb
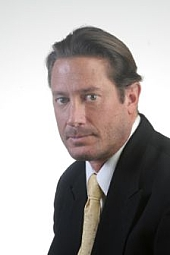
- Born: Lawrence Ross Goldfarb; Queens, New York City, NY
- Citizenship: American
- Education: George Washington University (BA); Georgetown University (JD)
- Occupations: Hedge fund manager and CEO
- Organization: LRG Capital Group
- Known for: LRG Capital Group, LRG Racing
- Awards: American Diabetes Association's Father of the Year Award
- Website: www.lawrencegoldfarb.com

Lawrence R. Goldfarb is an American hedge fund manager and CEO and founding partner of the LRG Capital Group, and former co-founder and board member of AutismAid.

== Education ==
Goldfarb grew up in the New York City boroughs outside Manhattan and attended Forest Hills High School. Following high school, he attended George Washington University, earned a B.A. in International Economics and graduated in 1981.

After graduating with a B.A., Goldfarb went on to attend law school at the Georgetown University Law School. While in law school, he wrote for The Georgetown Law Journal. In 1984, Goldfarb graduated cum laude with a Juris Doctor degree from Georgetown University Law School.

== Career ==
Goldfarb began his career as a tax attorney for Milbank, Tweed, Hadley & McCloy and subsequently became a tax analyst with Skadden, Arps, Slate, Meagher & Flom, where he specialized in financings, mergers and recapitalizations. Afterwards, Goldfarb moved to San Francisco, California and joined Credit Suisse First Boston Corporation as a partner and director of the Mergers and Acquisitions Group. In 1998, he formed BayStar Capital Management, LLC, a vehicle in which he could fund growth oriented, small capitalization, and publicly traded companies. Through Baystar, Goldfarb funded and invested in a variety of companies such as World Online & XM Satellite Radio. Goldfarb was well known for being one of the most foremost investors and experts in Private investment in public equity, also known as PIPEs. In 2005, he founded LRG Capital Group in Larkspur, California where he served as CEO until July 2011 when he announced his retirement from active management of the company to focus on philanthropic activities. Goldfarb currently serves as a board member and West Coast Director of AutismAid, an organization dedicated to assisting and fundraising for other autism non-profit organizations.

== Personal life ==
Goldfarb has dedicated his philanthropy to autism and diabetes. In 2010, Goldfarb was awarded The American Diabetes Association's Father of the Year Award. Additionally, he has served on the boards of various non-profits & organizations.

== SEC settlement ==
On March 1, 2011, the Securities and Exchange Commission (SEC) alleged that Goldfarb and his company illegally diverted $12 million from a hedge fund side pocket investment to other entities he controlled. On March 1, 2011, without admitting or denying the allegations, Goldfarb settled with the SEC. On June 20, 2012, the Court found that the defendants [Goldfarb] were in breach of the Final Judgment by failing to pay the disgorgement amounts ordered. The Court also found that defendants had failed to establish a good faith effort to fulfill their disgorgement obligations because, among other things, they used available funds for large personal expenses such as courtside seats to Golden State Warriors games, charters of aircraft for personal trips, Goldfarb's mortgage payment and numerous personal vacations, rather than to pay disgorgement.

== Philanthropy ==
Lawrence Goldfarb helped launch the Joe Toucan Diabetes Project. The project employs a Joe Toucan doll, books, and an array of other products to help fund research and education into pediatric diabetes. Goldfarb is active in several Bay Area charities.
