= CCC Yenching College =

Secondary school in Hong Kong

Coordinates: 22.3622°N 114.1053°E

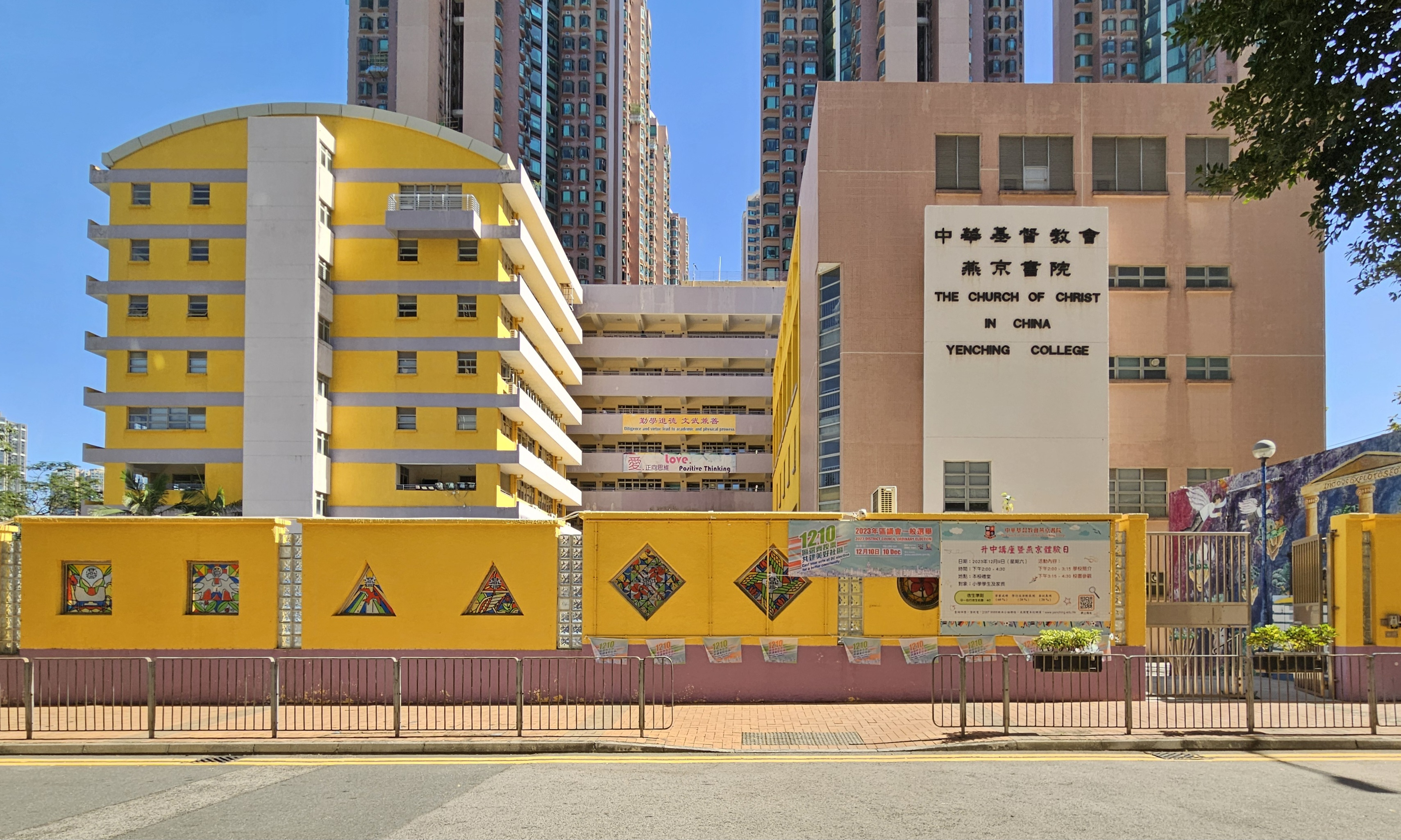
CCC Yenching College

The Church of Christ in China Yenching College (Chinese: 中華基督教會燕京書院), or CCC Yenching College, Yenching College (燕京書院) in short is a co-education secondary school in Nga Ying Chau of Tsing Yi Island, Hong Kong. The school is managed by The Hong Kong Council of the Church of Christ in China. A high proportion of the school's students come from low income families, and it offers programs to assist students with learning disabilities and special needs identify career pathways and learning goals.

== History ==
The secondary school was founded by alumni and teaching staff from Yenching University in Peking after the campus and some alumni was forced to incorporate in Peking University by Mao Zedong's Chinese Communist Party in 1952. The founders hoped that the school would restore to the university someday.

The school was founded in 1977. Reuseing the old building of South Sok Uk Government Primary School (南蘇屋官立小學), they established a secondary school in So Uk Estate. They named it Yenching College. In September 2000, it was moved to current premises in Nga Ying Chau, adjacent to Villa Esplanada. The old campus was passed to Vocational Training Council School of Business and Information Systems (職業訓練局工商資訊學院), namely nowadays Vocational Training Council Youth College (職業訓練局青年學院).
