= LIRG =

LIRG may refer to:

- Luminous infrared galaxy
- Guidonia Air Force Base, by ICAO code

== See also ==
- LRG (disambiguation)
