= Institute of Professional Education and Knowledge =

Institute of Professional Education And Knowledge
- Established: 2003
- Location: 9/F, VTC Tower, 27 Wood Road, Wanchai, Hong Kong
- Website: Official website

Institute of Professional Education and Knowledge
- Traditional Chinese: 高峰進修學院
Transcriptions
Yue: Cantonese
- Yale Romanization: Gōu fūng jeun sāu hohk yuhn
- Jyutping: Gou1 fung1 zeon3 sau1 hok6 jyun6

The Institute of Professional Education and Knowledge (PEAK; Chinese: 高峰進修學院) is a public post-secondary educational institution under the Vocational Training Council in Hong Kong.

PEAK was formed in 2003 by the merger of the Financial Services Development Centre, the Information Technology Training and Development Centre, and the Management Development Centre. The institute offers courses in: financial services, management, information technology, languages, construction, real estate & property management, and food safety.
