= World Online =

European Internet service provider

World Online (WOL) was a European Internet service provider (ISP) which came to prominence in the late 1990s dotcom boom.

Founded by Dutch entrepreneur Nina Brink, World Online's name indicated its aspiration to rival the hugely successful American ISP, AOL (America On-Line). The company aimed to provide free internet access across Europe. It launched its full internet service in the Netherlands in 1996, and grew rapidly to have a presence in 15 European countries and South Africa; counting some 1.9 million customers by the year 2000.

Based in Rotterdam, Netherlands, the shareholders included the Swiss Sandoz Family Foundation, Dutch telecom provider Telfort, Dutch investment company Reggeborgh Beheer and Intel.

== IPO ==
WOL's IPO in 2000 proved a disaster and left the reputations of the banks, the Amsterdam stock exchange and the company itself tarnished.

It was set to be officially listed on the Amsterdam Stock Exchange on March 17, 2000. It was underwritten by ABN AMRO and Goldman Sachs, and promoted via a pan-European ad campaign involving hired celebrities like former royal Sarah, Duchess of York, actor Christopher Reeve, and rocker Joe Cocker.

The initial price of the stock was set at €43, giving the company a valuation of €12 billion — the largest ever IPO for the Amsterdam exchange, and the largest IPO of any European Internet company. The initial offer on the AEX was 21 times oversubscribed.

However, not everyone was confident the company’s success was secure. World Online’s 1999 revenues totalled a mere €64 million, while net losses reached €91 million. More telling, while WOL was a giant in the Netherlands, it was a minor player in most of its other markets. It was not even among the top five players in the crucial markets of France, Germany, or Italy. Moreover, the €12 billion valuation assessed the company’s 1.9 million subscribers at a high €6,500 each. France-based ISP LibertySurf, which did an IPO the day before WOL's, valued its subscribers at less than €3,000 each.

In pre-launch trading in London's gray market, World Online's shares were going for upwards of €72. When the AEX opened on Friday, March 17, trading in WOL stock was fast; some 57 million of the 64 million new WOL shares were traded on that first day. Although the price rose briefly to €50, the upsurge was not to last. Trading had to be suspended three times after price falls, and the stock finally ended the day back at €43.

On its second day of trading, WOL tumbled 16% below its listing price. By March 22 the stock was trading at €31. The stock continued to fall over the next days; its value plunging from €12 billion to €5 billion in a week.

The tumbling share price coincided with the disclosure that Nina Brink had sold her stake in the ISP in December, prior to the flotation, for $60 million. A San Francisco-based private equity house, BayStar Capital, purchased her slice of the business at just $6.04 a share.

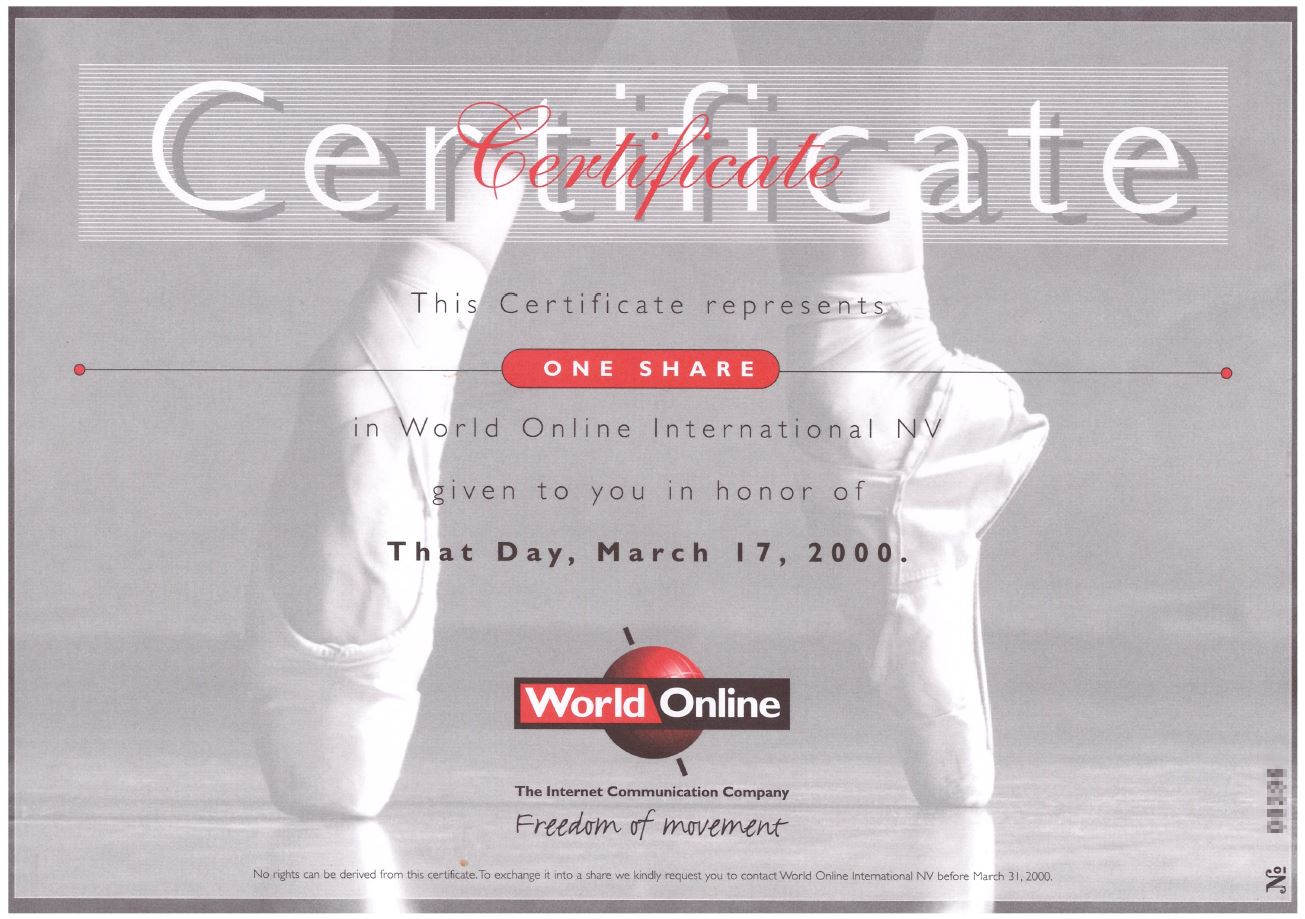
One Share given to Employee

Dutch investors, including World Online staff who took up loans from the company to buy shares, were outraged. Many claimed that they would never have invested in the company in the first place if they had known Brink had already sold her shares. Though the prospectus noted that Brink had "transferred" her shares, aggrieved shareholders claimed that they were misled because the prospectus should have said she "sold" her shares to Baystar.

It later became known that, fearing a market collapse, the banks had wanted the WOL float to go ahead quickly. The AEX, however, had threatened to stop the initial offering because of Brink's pre-selling of most of her holding. ABN Amro responded by threatening an injunction against the exchange.

The AEX wanted Brink to lock up the shares transferred to Baystar, and $25 million being her participation in Baystar. She agreed to an extra lockup arrangement on shares she still controlled, and this was put in the prospectus. As a result of an apparent deficiency in Dutch law, it was not necessary for Brink's shareholding to be fully disclosed in the prospectus.

The exchange eventually permitted the listing after it was shown that Baystar had not agreed to a lock-up agreement to keep its shares for a time, as is usual in such situations. In fact, Baystar had been an aggressive seller from the first day of trading.

== Post IPO ==
Brink resigned from her job in April under pressure from employees and investors. In May, a class action was brought to a Dutch court alleging that World Online, its bankers, ABN Amro, and Brink broke Dutch securities regulations when the ISP floated on the Amsterdam stock market.

James Kinsella, an American, previously CEO of MSNBC.com, replaced Brink as Chairman of World Online in June. He curtailed marketing and the editorial department, and fired 150 employees at the Rotterdam corporate headquarters. He focussed on becoming a network operator and increasing subscriber numbers by introducing a flat-fee service, but the company was limited in its success of stimulating growth. Kinsella eventually sold World Online to Tiscali, an Italian competitor, in a deal that valued WOL at more than $5 billion.

== Sale to Tiscali ==
On September 7, 2000, World Online and Tiscali, an Italian ISP, announced their intention to combine the two companies to create a pan-European Internet network company. The new company would provide new telco, media and e-commerce services to the largest pan-European customer base.

The combination maintained the Tiscali name and its headquarters in Sardinia, Italy. Renato Soru, the founder of Tiscali, became Executive Chairman with James Kinsella becoming Chief Executive.

Tiscali emerged from the all-share deal with 56.7% of the new company while World Online had 43.3%. The merger created, with over 6 million subscribers, the second-largest ISP in Europe, after Deutsche Telekom's T-Online.

The move gave Tiscali access to the cash raised by World Online at its IPO. The new company was set to have a market capitalisation of about $11.2 billion and be a market leader in Italy, the Netherlands, Belgium, Denmark and the Czech Republic.

In November 2000 the HQ of World Online was raided concerning allegations of insider trading. In February 2001, Kinsella resigned from his position after clashing with Soru. Kinsella went on to become Chairman of Interoute, a large European network operator owned by the Sandoz Family Foundation. Brink is now a Dutch tax exile living in Brasschaat, Belgium. Renato Soru was elected President of the Sardinia Region of Italy in 2004.

== Delisting ==
On 12 January 2001, WOL was deleted from the stock market because Tiscali owned all the stocks.
