= School for Higher and Professional Education =

- 才晉高等教育學院
- Type: Vocational
- Established: 2003
- Parent institution: Vocational Training Council
- Principal: Gladys Yam
- Students: 3,000+
- Location: Hong Kong
- Website: Official website

Chinese name
- Simplified Chinese: 才晋高等教育学院
- Traditional Chinese: 才晉高等教育學院
Transcriptions
Standard Mandarin
- Hanyu Pinyin: Cáijìn Gāoděng Jiàoyù Xuéyuàn
Yue: Cantonese
- Yale Romanization: Chòih jeun gōu dáng gaau yuhk hohk yuhn
- Jyutping: Coi4 zeon3 gou1 dang2 gaau3 juk6 hok6 jyun6

School for Higher and Professional Education (SHAPE, Chinese: 才晉高等教育學院) is a public post-secondary educational institution under the Vocational Training Council in Hong Kong.

It offers "top-up" degree programmes to holders of higher diplomas to allow them to receive a bachelor's degree. It was established in 2003 as a collaborative effort of the VTC and a number of overseas institutions. SHAPE offers programmes in finance, applied science, business and management, information technology, design, engineering, and hospitality.

SHAPE has campuses in Chai Wan, Tsing Yi, Sha Tin, Wanchai, Kwun Tong, Tseung Kwan O, and Tuen Mun.

== Partner Institutions ==
Degrees from SHAPE are developed and awarded in collaboration with the following institutions:

Institution	Country	Notes
Birmingham City University	United Kingdom	
China Pharmaceutical University	China	
Coventry University	United Kingdom	
Nottingham Trent University	United Kingdom	
RMIT University	Australia	
Sheffield Hallam University	United Kingdom	
Solent University	United Kingdom	
University for the Creative Arts	United Kingdom	
University of Central Lancashire	United Kingdom	
University of Hull	United Kingdom	
University of Lincoln	United Kingdom	
Northumbria University	United Kingdom	
UWE Bristol	United Kingdom	
