= Hong Kong Design Institute =

Hong Kong design school

- 香港知專設計學院
- Established: 2007; 19 years ago
- Parent institution: Vocational Training Council
- Principal: Dr LAM Yee Nee, Elita
- Location: Tiu Keng Leng, Hong Kong; 22.3057°N 114.2534°E
- Campus: Urban
- Website: hkdi.edu.hk

Hong Kong Design Institute
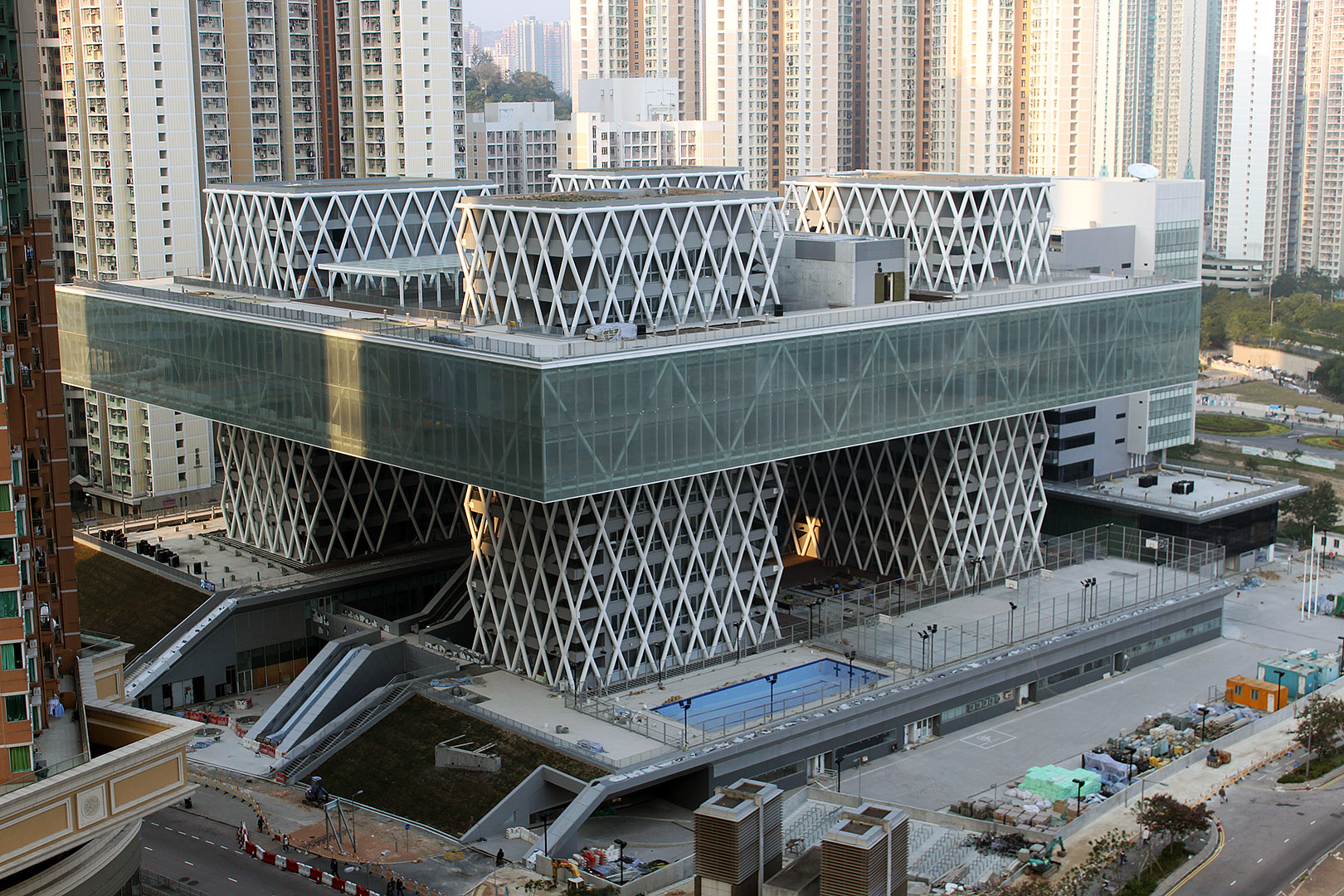
- Hong Kong Design Institute in January 2010
- Traditional Chinese: 香港知專設計學院
- Simplified Chinese: 香港 知专设计学院
Transcriptions
Standard Mandarin
- Hanyu Pinyin: Xiānggǎng Zhī Zhuān Shèjì Xuéyuàn
Yue: Cantonese
- Yale Romanization: Hēung góng jī jyūn chit gai hohk yuhn
- Jyutping: Hoeng^{1} gong^{2} zi^{1} zyun^{1} cit^{3} gai^{3} hok^{6} jyun^{6*2}

Hong Kong Design Institute (HKDI) is a public design school in Tiu Keng Leng, Tseung Kwan O, Hong Kong. It was founded by the Vocational Training Council in 2007 and moved into a purpose-built campus in 2010. The school offers higher diplomas, academic degrees, and continuing education programmes in various design disciplines.

== History ==
The Hong Kong Design Institute was envisioned to centralise existing design programmes offered at various other Hong Kong Institute of Vocational Education campuses in Tiu Keng Leng, Sha Tin, Kwai Chung, Kwun Tong, and Tsing Yi.

In April 2006, the VTC opened an international architecture competition to design a new campus able to accommodate 4,000 students. The competition was judged by a panel of noted architects including Richard Meier and Rocco Yim. The winning design, which beat out 162 other submissions, was produced by the French architecture firm Coldefy & Associés.

== Administration ==
Academic oversight of the Hong Kong Design Institute is provided by the Academic Director (Design Discipline) of the Vocational Training Council who is concurrently the campus Principal. The Hong Kong Design Institute and Institute of Vocational Education (Lee Wai Lee) combined campus at Tiu Keng Leng is managed by the campus Principal and Vice-Principals. The Design programmes are offered mainly at the Tiu Keung Leng site with some programmes located at the IVE (Kwun Tong) and IVE (Morison Hill) campuses.

== Academic departments and programmes ==
=== Department of Architecture, Interior and Product Design ===
- Architectural Design
- Design for Event, Exhibition and Performance
- Furniture and Lifestyle Product Design
- Interior Design
- Jewellery Design and Technology
- Landscape Architecture
- Product Design

=== Department of Communication Design ===
- Advertising Design
- User Experience Design
- Visual Communication Design
- Illustration
- Visual Arts and Culture

=== Department of Digital Media ===
- Animation and Visual Effects
- Arts Technology
- Digital Media Production
- Film, Television and Photography
- Music Production

=== Department of Fashion and Image Design ===
- Costume Design for Performance
- Digital Fashion Branding and Buying
- Fashion Design
- Fashion Image Design
- Fashion Media Design

== Knowledge Centres ==
- HKDI Centre for Communication Design (CCD)
- HKDI Centre for Innovative Material and Technology (CIMT)
- HKDI Centre of Design Services and Solutions (CDSS)
- HKDI DESIS Lab (Design for Social Innovation and Sustainability)
- HKDI Fashion Archive
- HKDI Media Lab

== Campus ==
The HKDI campus, located in Tiu Keng Leng in Tseung Kwan O New Town, opened in the fall of 2010. The building comprises a massive rectangular volume suspended seven storeys above street level on four towers supported by a steel lattice exoskeleton. The podium houses four auditoriums and lecture theaters, a cafe, and gallery and exhibition space. Sports facilities include an indoor games hall, outdoor basketball courts, and a swimming pool.

The HKDI is located beside the new Institute of Vocational Education (IVE) Lee Wai Lee campus, which relocated from Kowloon Tong before the 2010-11 school year. The two buildings are linked together by footbridges.

The campus is across the street from Tiu Keng Leng station (Exit A2), which serves both the Tseung Kwan O line and Kwun Tong line of the MTR.

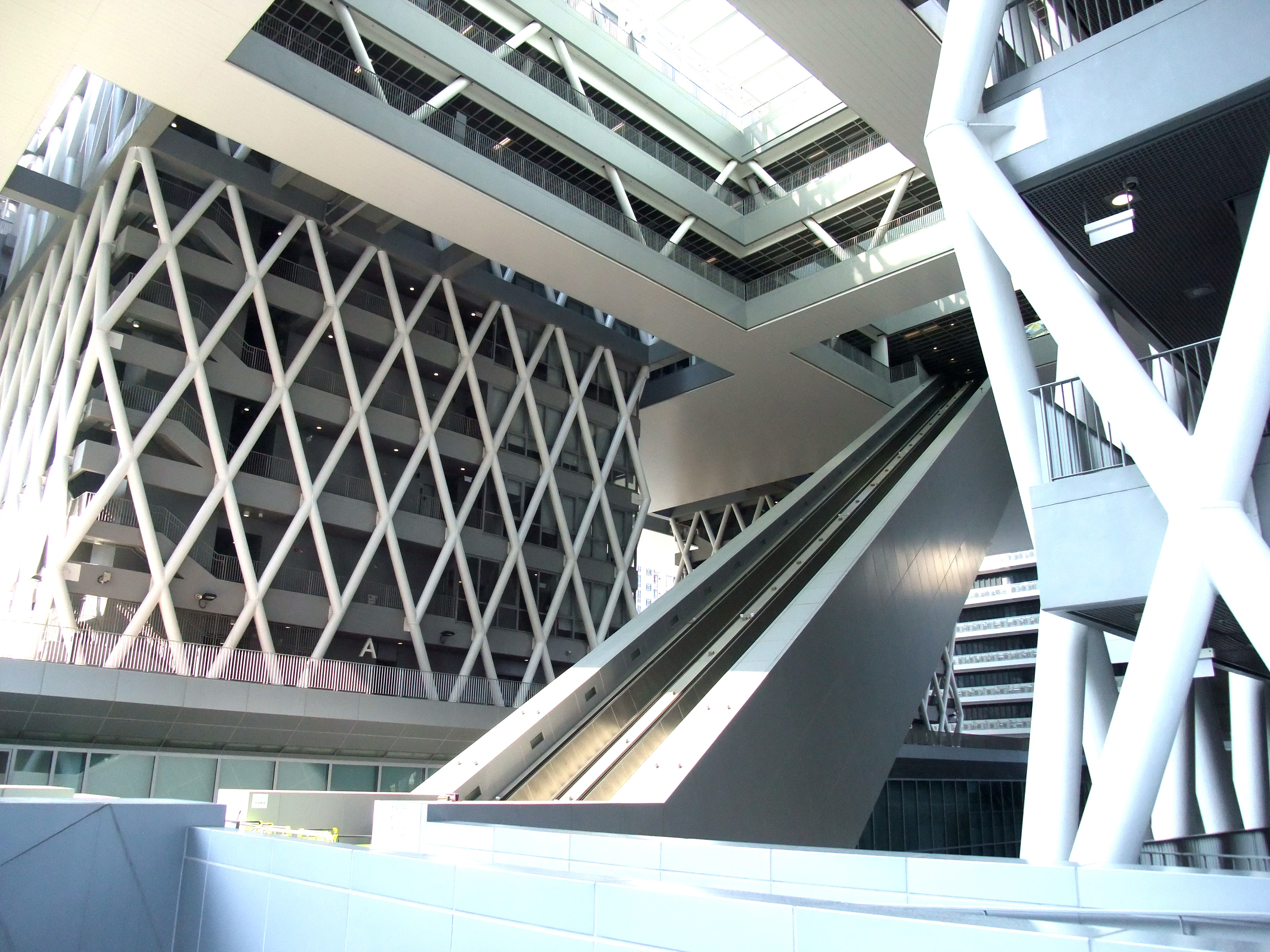
Escalator to 7th floor in April 2011

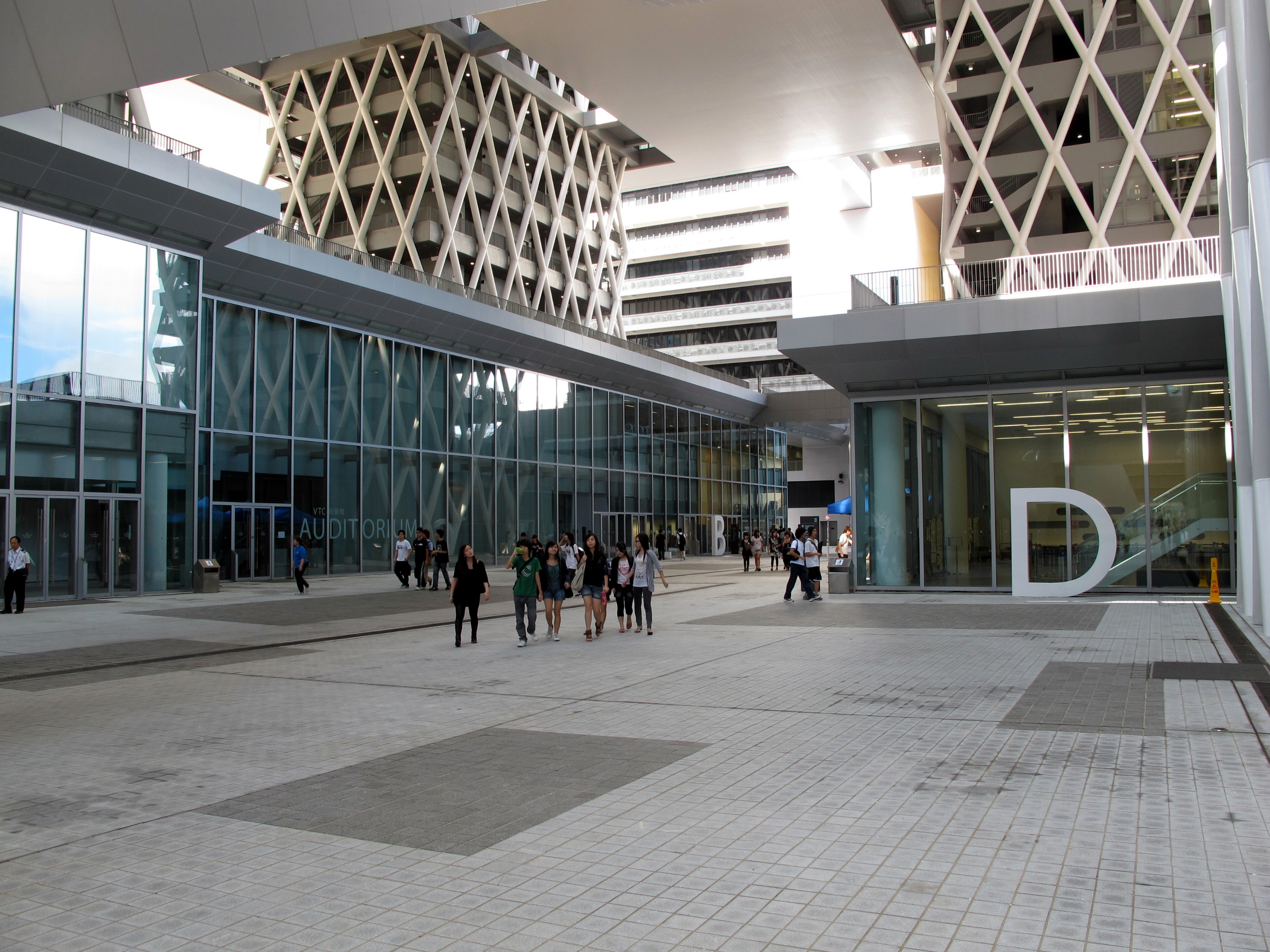
Design Boulevard in September 2010

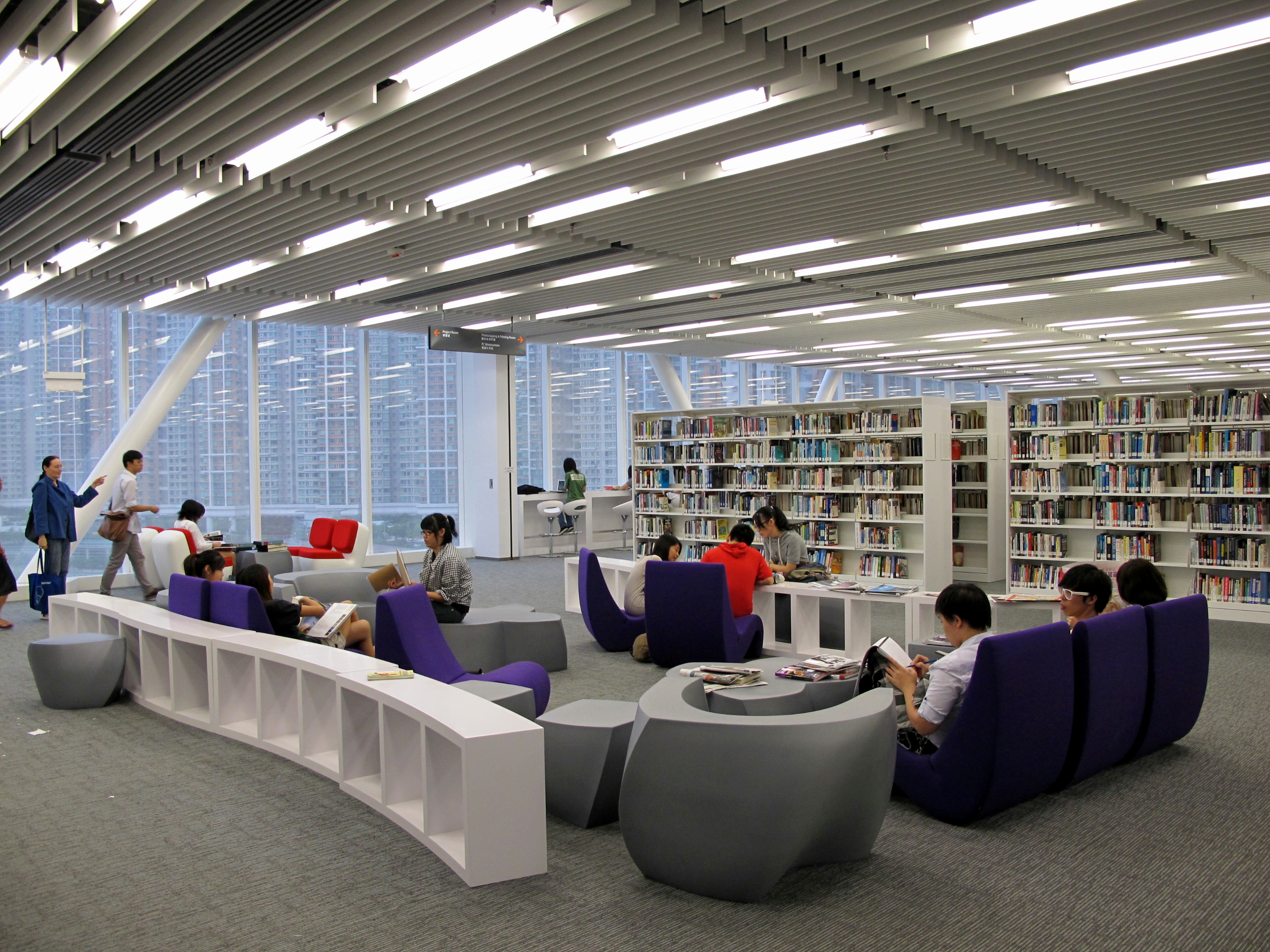
Learning Resource Centre, 7th floor in September 2010

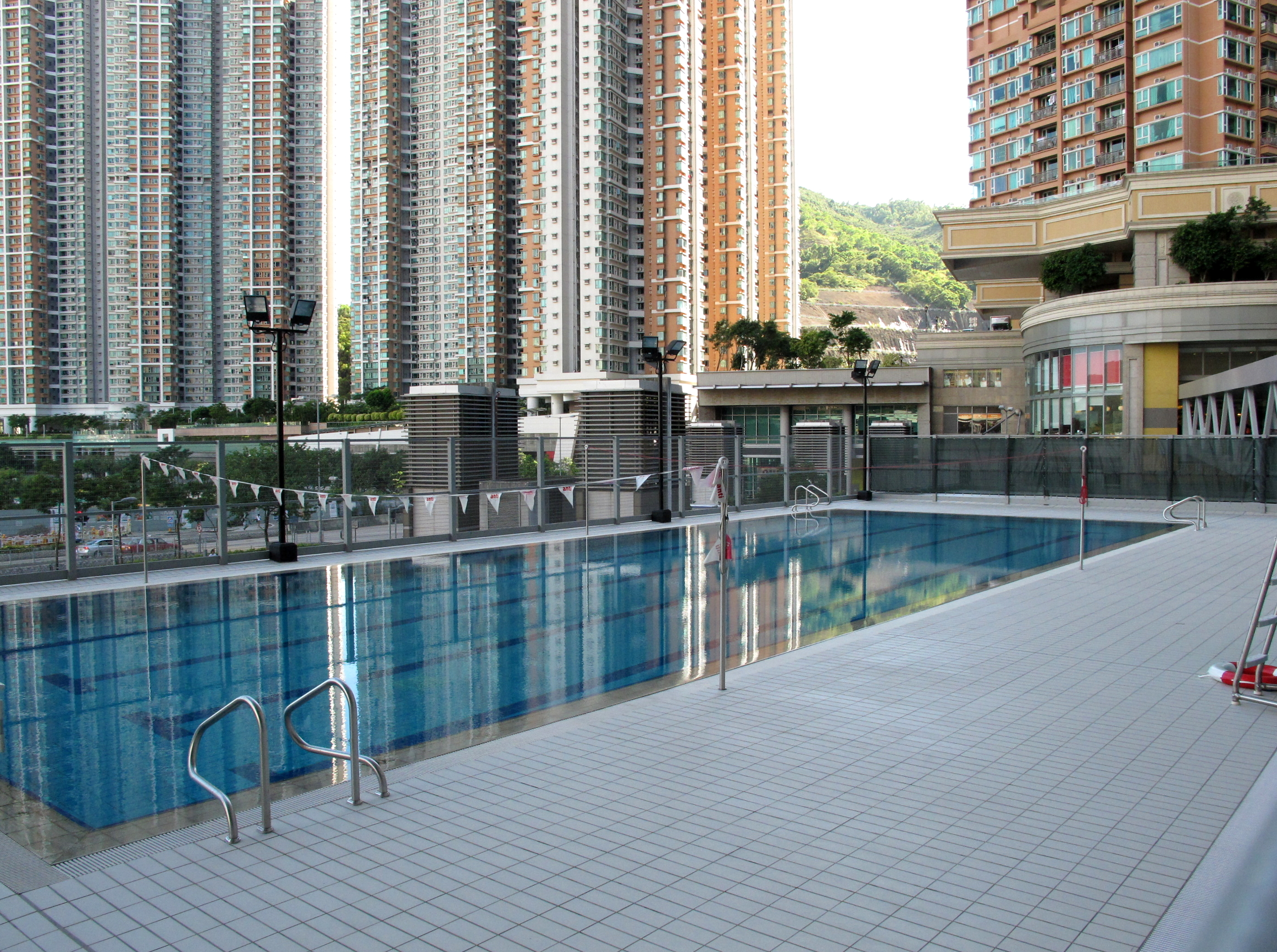
Swimming pool in September 2010
