= Vocational Training Council =

Statutory body of Hong Kong

The Vocational Training Council
- 職業訓練局
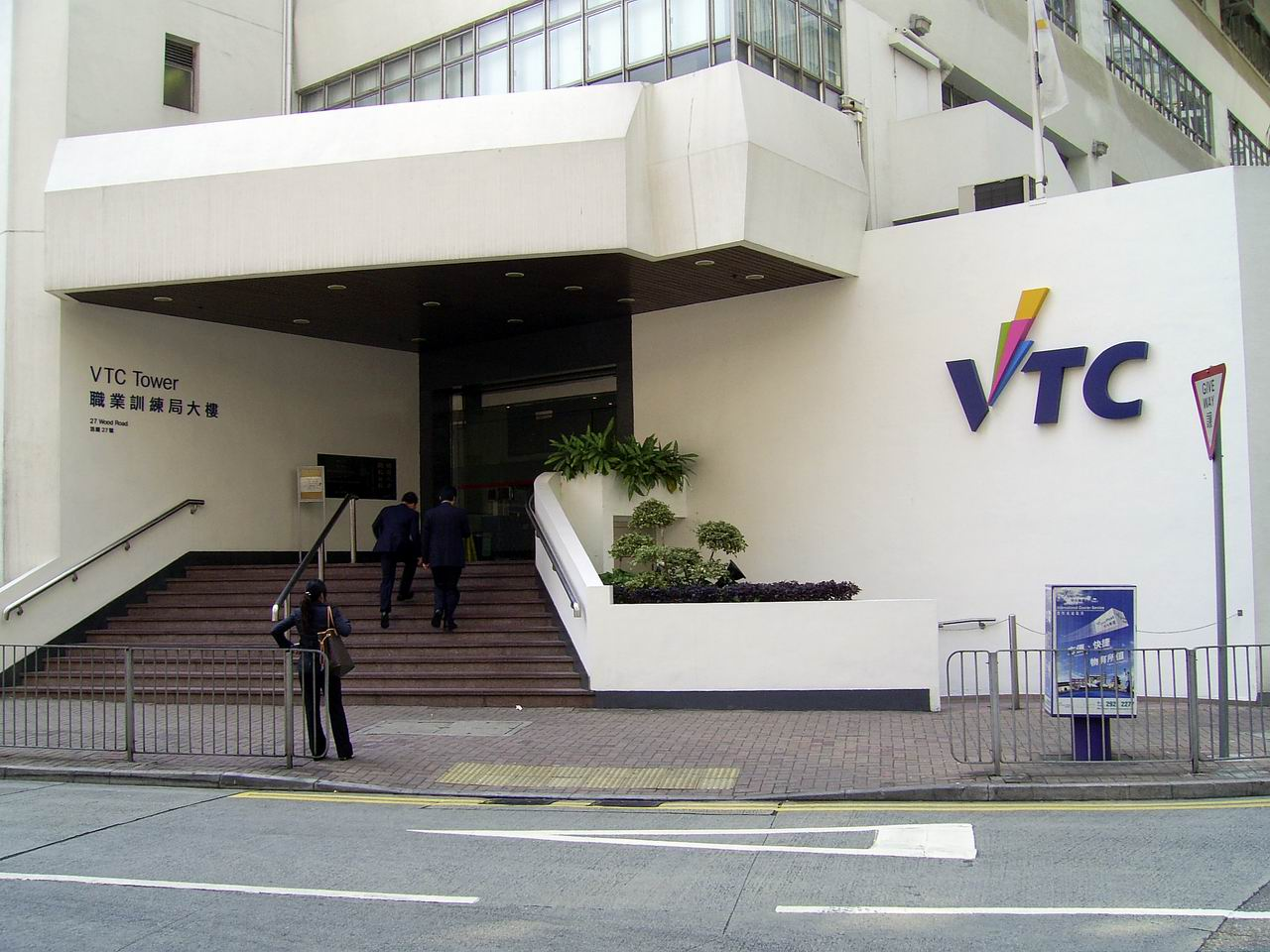
- Vocational Training Council Tower on Wood Road
- Type: Vocational
- Established: 1982
- Director: Mrs Carrie Yau
- Students: 250,000
- Location: Hong Kong
- Website: vtc.edu.hk

Vocational Training Council
- Traditional Chinese: 職業訓練局
- Simplified Chinese: 职业训练局
- Cantonese Yale: Jīk yihp fan lihn gúk
Transcriptions
Standard Mandarin
- Hanyu Pinyin: Zhíyè Xùnliànjú
Yue: Cantonese
- Yale Romanization: Jīk yihp fan lihn gúk
- Jyutping: Zik1 jip6 fan3 lin6 guk2

The Vocational Training Council (VTC) is a statutory body of Hong Kong, established under the "Vocational Training Council Ordinance (Cap.1130)". It is a publicly-established government-funded institution for the provision of vocational education.

It is the largest vocational education, training, and professional development group in Hong Kong. Established in 1982, the VTC provides credentials for some 250,000 students each year through a full range of pre-employment and in-service programmes with internationally recognised qualifications.

== History ==
The VTC was established in 1982 to provide skills-based training to the Hong Kong workforce. The first programmes began in 1984 at the newly established campus in Kowloon Bay, focusing on craft-based and operative courses. in 1986, the VTC expanded to two new locations in Tuen Mun and Sha Tin. in 1991, the Skills Centre was established in Tuen Mun to provide skills training to students with disabilities. in 1993, new campuses were established in Tsing Yi and Chai Wan which aimed to provide sub-degree programmes, previously operated by polytechnic colleges. in 1999 a number of technical colleges were merged under the umbrella of the VTC to create the Institute of Vocational Education.

In 2000, the VTC established the Chinese Cuisine Training Institute in Pokfulam. In 2003, the School for Higher and Professional Education was established to provide top-up degree programmes and the Institute of Professional Education and Knowledge was set up to provide post-graduate and professional skills development programmes. In 2004, the VTC established the Youth College as an alternative to the standard high-school education system for students. In 2006, the VTC became the first vocational training organisation to gain accreditation from the Hong Kong Council for Accreditation of Academic and Vocational Qualifications. In 2007, the Hong Kong Design Institute began offering design-related courses to students. In 2008, the Integrated Vocational Development Centre was set up to provide skills-development courses. In 2009, the WMG School for Professional Development was established, in a partnership with University of Warwick, to provide Master's-level degree courses. In 2011, the VTC opened the T-Hotel, which was the first such student-run hotel in Hong Kong, which is used to provide training to hospitality students. In 2012, the Technological and Higher Education Institute of Hong Kong was established to offer courses which combine traditional academic studies with more practical elements.

== Roles ==
In addition to its role as a provider of vocational education in Hong Kong, the VTC also acts as an advisory body to the Hong Kong Government on issues related to the vocational and training needs of Hong Kong.

Under The Vocational Training Council Ordinance (CAP 1130), the VTC is also tasked with: the promotion of apprenticeships in Hong Kong; providing vocational training opportunities to disabled persons over the age of 15; to provide courses for the improvement of industry in Hong Kong; and, to create and manage the facilities required to carry out these activities. In order to achieve these goals, the VTC is required to present an annual report to the Chief Executive covering all relevant information.

== Member institutions ==
The VTC has a wide variety of member institutions, each with a different industry or discipline focus.

Table Name
Name	Chinese Name	Established	Enrolment	Campus location	Description
Hong Kong Design Institute	香港知專設計學院	2011	54,624	Tseung Kwan O	Provides instructional programmes focused around the creative arts, design, art and other related fields.
Hong Kong Institute of Vocational Education	香港專業教育學院	1999	54,624	Chai Wan, Cheung Sha Wan, Kwai Chung, Kwun Tong, Sha Tin, Tseung Kwan O, Tsing Yi, Tuen Mun, Wan Chai	Offers a variety of courses in different disciplines. Its programmes range in level, from higher diploma to certificate-level.
~~School of Business and Information Systems~~	工商資訊學院	2001	54,624	Kwai Chung	Discontinued in 2024.
Youth College	青年學院	2004	54,624	Kowloon Bay, Kwai Chung, Tin Shui Wai, Tseung Kwan O	Aimed at providing vocational training programmes for students who have achieved a Secondary Three level education under the local Hong Kong high school system.
Chinese Culinary Institute	中華廚藝學院	2000	1,755	Pokfulam	Established to provide catering-related and culinary skills training courses to those wishing to practice Chinese cuisine, both amateurs and those seeking skills development.
Hotel and Tourism Institute	酒店及旅遊學院	1984	4,667	Kowloon Bay, Pokfulam, Yuen Long	Established to provide hospitality-related training courses to school-leavers. The HITDC also operates the T-Hotel in Pokfulam which it uses to provide practical training to students.
Institute of Professional Education And Knowledge	高峰進修學院	2003	96,623	Wan Chai	Established to provide professionals, or graduates, with post-graduate and professional development programmes. PEAK often offers such courses in partnership with other local or international tertiary education institutions.
Integrated Vocational Development Centre	匯縱專業發展中心	2008		Cheung Sha Wan, Fanling, Lai Chi Kok, Ma On Shan, Sheung Shui, Tuen Mun, Tseung Kwan O, Yau Ma Tei	Established to provide vocation-centric training initiatives to students with a variety of education and experience backgrounds.
International Culinary Institute	國際廚藝學院	2014	1,770 (as of 2018)	Pokfulam	
Maritime Services Training Institute	海事訓練學院	1988	5,186	Tuen Mun	Provides training for high-school graduates centred on marine-related industries.
Pro-Act by VTC	卓越培訓發展中心	1984	9,931	Kowloon Bay, Kwai Chung, Pokfulam, Tuen Mun	Provides instruction on a variety of vocational fields, ranging from automotive-related courses, jewellery production and fashion and textiles.
School for Higher and Professional Education	才晉高等教育學院	2003	4,493	Chai Wan	Established to partner with local and overseas tertiary education institutions to offer top-up degree programmes.
Shine Skills Centre	展亮技能發展中心		648	Kwun Tong, Pokfulam, Tuen Mun	Established to provide programmes to students with special needs, aged 15 years or over. It was created to assist this group be providing them with employment-focused skills.
Technological and Higher Education Institute of Hong Kong	香港高等教育科技學院	2012	2,456	Tsing Yi	Established to offer a variety of programmes which aim to incorporate practical training into more traditional higher educational programmes.
~~Yeo Chei Man Senior Secondary School~~	邱子文高中學校	2004		Tseung Kwan O	Established to provide a more flexible secondary education for students. Students are given the choice of a standard examination, or they may sit for entry into VTC-run programmes and Higher Diploma programmes. Discontinued in 2014.
Hong Kong Institute of Information Technology	香港資訊科技學院	2023		Tsing Yi, Chai Wan, Tseung Kwan O, Sha Tin, Tuen Mun and Kwun Tong campuses	Established to develop from the information technology discipline of the Hong Kong Institute of Vocational Education to an IT specialised institute.

== Controversies ==
In 1999, the South China Morning Post published an article outlining poor management within the VTC which was reported to have resulted in HK$160 million in lost revenue. The losses resulted from mismanagement of VTC resources, such as housing for senior staff; the upkeep of facilities which were underused; and the payment of cash in lieu of leave to staff.

In 2012, it came to light that some instructors at the VTC were providing their students with unfair advantages in an attempt to boost their exam results. This was attributed to the practice of tying instructor contracts to student performance and pass-rates.
