= LRG Capital Group =

- Type: Private Ownership
- Industry: Private Equity
- Founder: Lawrence R. Goldfarb
- Headquarters: San Francisco, California, United States
- Products: Private equity funds, Leveraged buyouts
- Website: www.lrgcapital.com

LRG Capital Group is a global investment, banking and advisory shop that focuses on public and private companies in the technology, life sciences, hospitality, real estate and entertainment sectors. The firm was founded by Lawrence R. Goldfarb, formerly a managing director in the mergers & acquisitions group at CS First Boston.

LRG provides capital via private equity investments, commercial loans and structured debt financing, and advises clients on mergers and acquisitions, corporate finance advice and other strategic alternatives. Headquartered in San Francisco with offices in New York City and Miami, LRG Capital Group does relationship-focused guidance and financing.

The company has five business units:

- Corporate Advisory Services;
- LRG Capital Funds;
- LRG Hospitality Group;
- LRG Cascade;
- Commercial Ventures
- Real Estate Ventures.

LRG Capital Group is the investment manager for the LRG BayStar Capital III Investment Fund. Prior BayStar Capital Funds have collectively invested over $1.5 billion of equity in more than 250 companies.

LRG Capital Corporate Advisory Group provides financial advisory and capital-raising agency services and represents clients on equity and debt placements, restructurings, recapitalizations, management buyouts and other strategic alternatives.

LRG Capital Real Estate Ventures invests in and owns various entertainment interests and U.S. and non-U.S. real estate assets, including derivative interests in real estate securities and real estate development projects and properties. LRG Capital Group has also been recognized for its financing expertise in technology, life science and entertainment development ventures and companies throughout the U.S. and abroad.

LRG Capital Commercial Ventures provides flexible investment capital and financing options to businesses across all sectors that are positioned for near-term growth. LRG Commercial Ventures functions as a merchant bank for private companies by utilizing a variety of credit protected and equity participation structures.

== See also ==
- LRG Capital Funds
- LRG Racing LLC
