= Maritime Services Training Institute =

Educational institution in Hong Kong

- 海事訓練學院
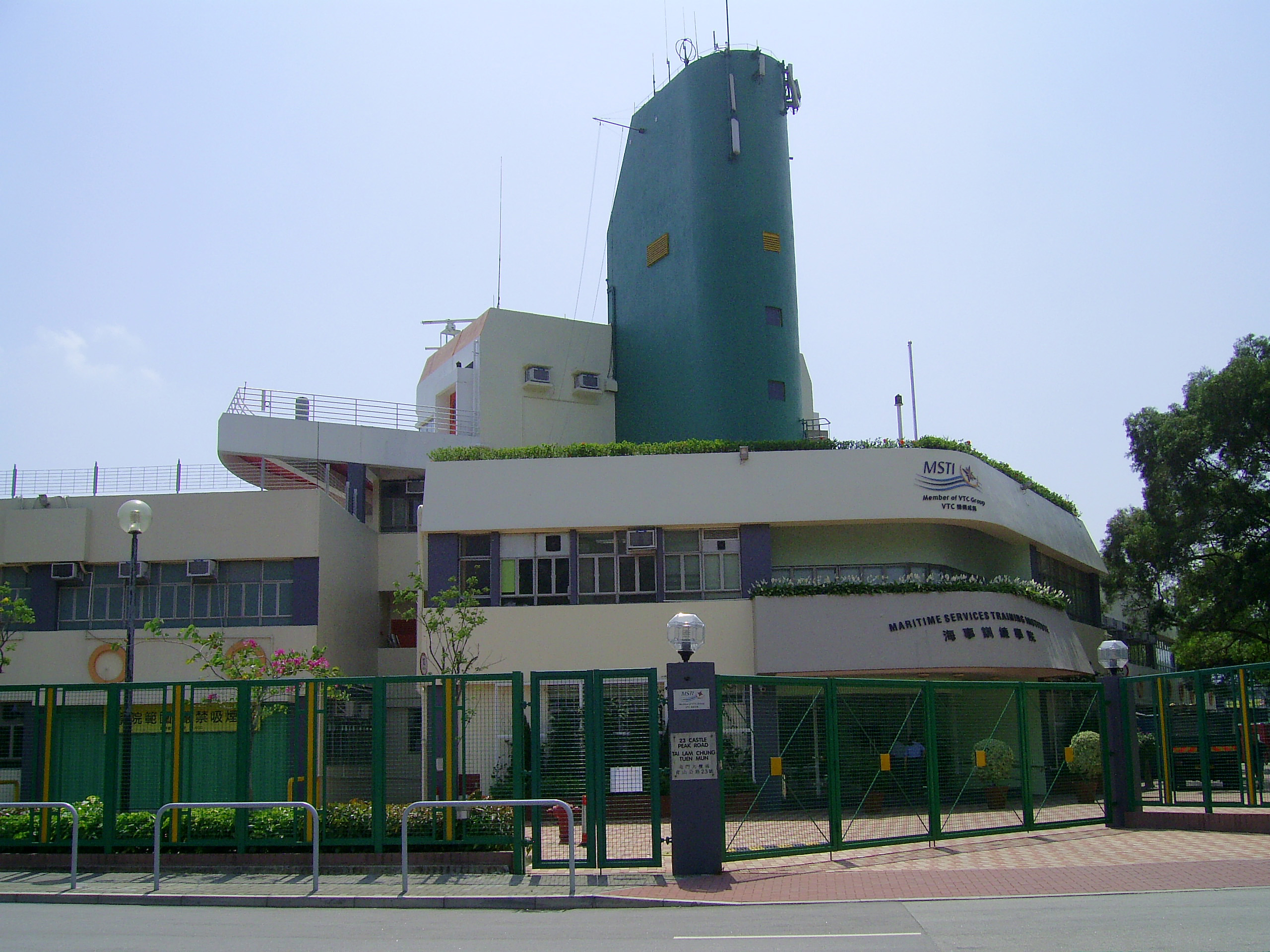
- MSTI Campus
- Former name: Seamen’s Training Centre
- Established: 1988
- Students: 5,000 (approx)
- Location: 23 Castle Peak Road, Tai Lam Chung, Tuen Mun District, Hong Kong
- Website: Official website

Maritime Services Training Institute
- Traditional Chinese: 海事訓練學院
- Simplified Chinese: 海事训练学院
Transcriptions
Standard Mandarin
- Hanyu Pinyin: Hǎishì Xùnliàn Xuéyuàn
Yue: Cantonese
- Yale Romanization: Hói sih fan lihn hohk yuhn
- Jyutping: Hoi2 si6 fan3 lin6 hoh6 jun6

Maritime Services Training Institute (MSTI, Chinese: 海事訓練學院) is a public post-secondary educational institution in Hong Kong which provides training in maritime services. It is operated by the Vocational Training Council.

The MSTI was previously known as the Seamen's Training Centre; its name was changed to in 2003 to reflect a broader scope. Part of the impetus for the MSTI's establishment was to provide training, and opportunities for those engaged in marine-related industries, and to make careers in marine services more attractive to the younger generation.

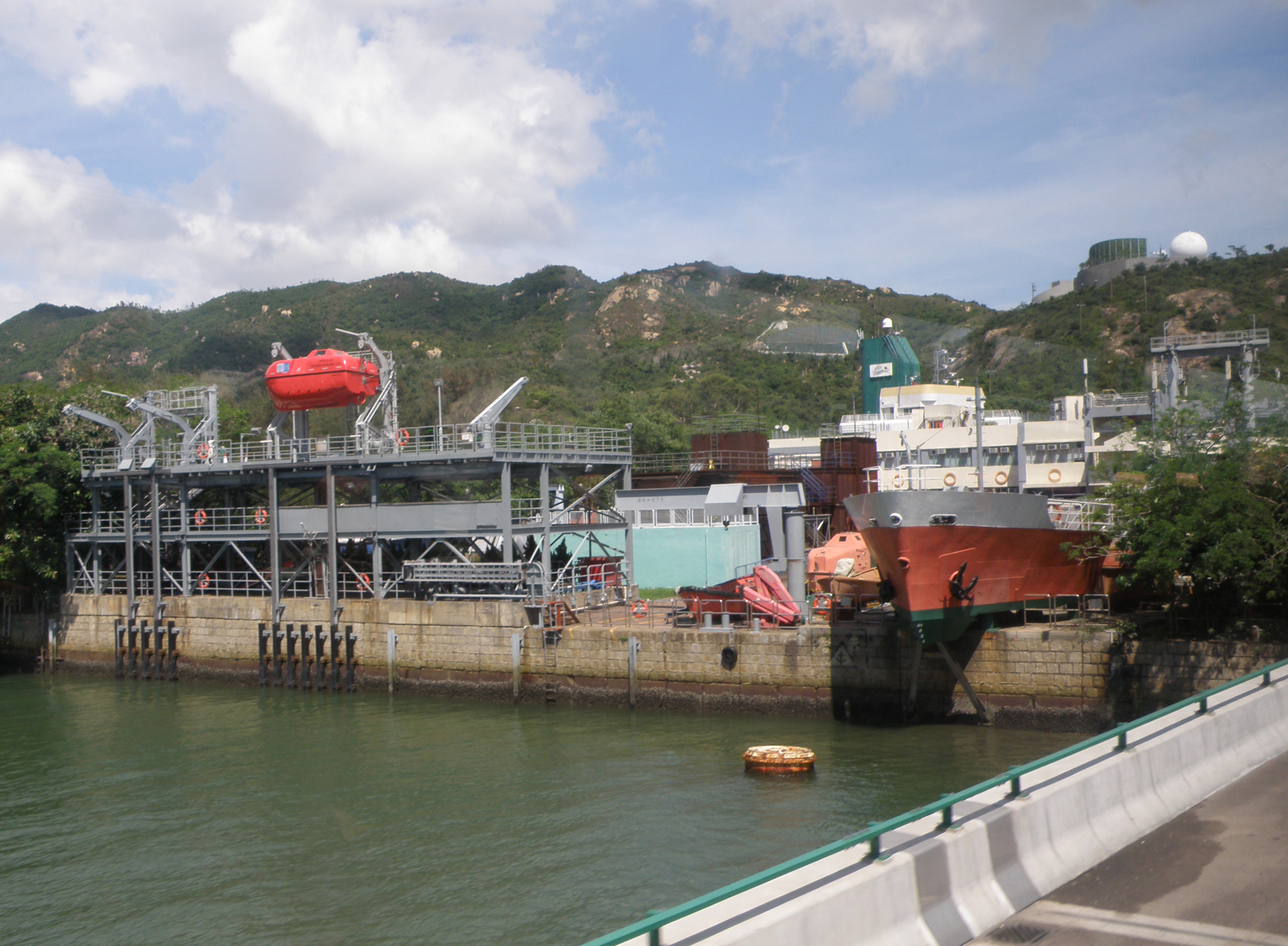
The Maritime Services Training Institute in Tai Lam, Hong Kong.
