= Youth College =

- Traditional Chinese: 青年學院
- Simplified Chinese: 青年学院
Transcriptions
Standard Mandarin
- Hanyu Pinyin: Qīngnián Xuéyuàn
Yue: Cantonese
- Jyutping: cing1 nin4 hok6 jyun6*2

Youth College (Chinese: 青年學院) is a member of the Vocational Training Council which offers an interactive learning environment for youths above Secondary 3 to acquire knowledge and skills for further studies and employment. It was established in 2004.

== Campuses ==
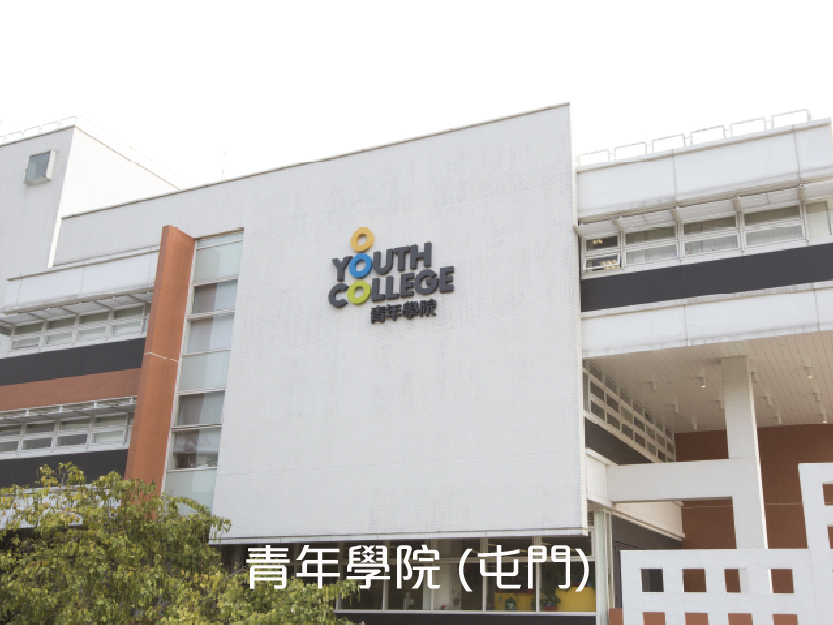
Tuen Mun Campus

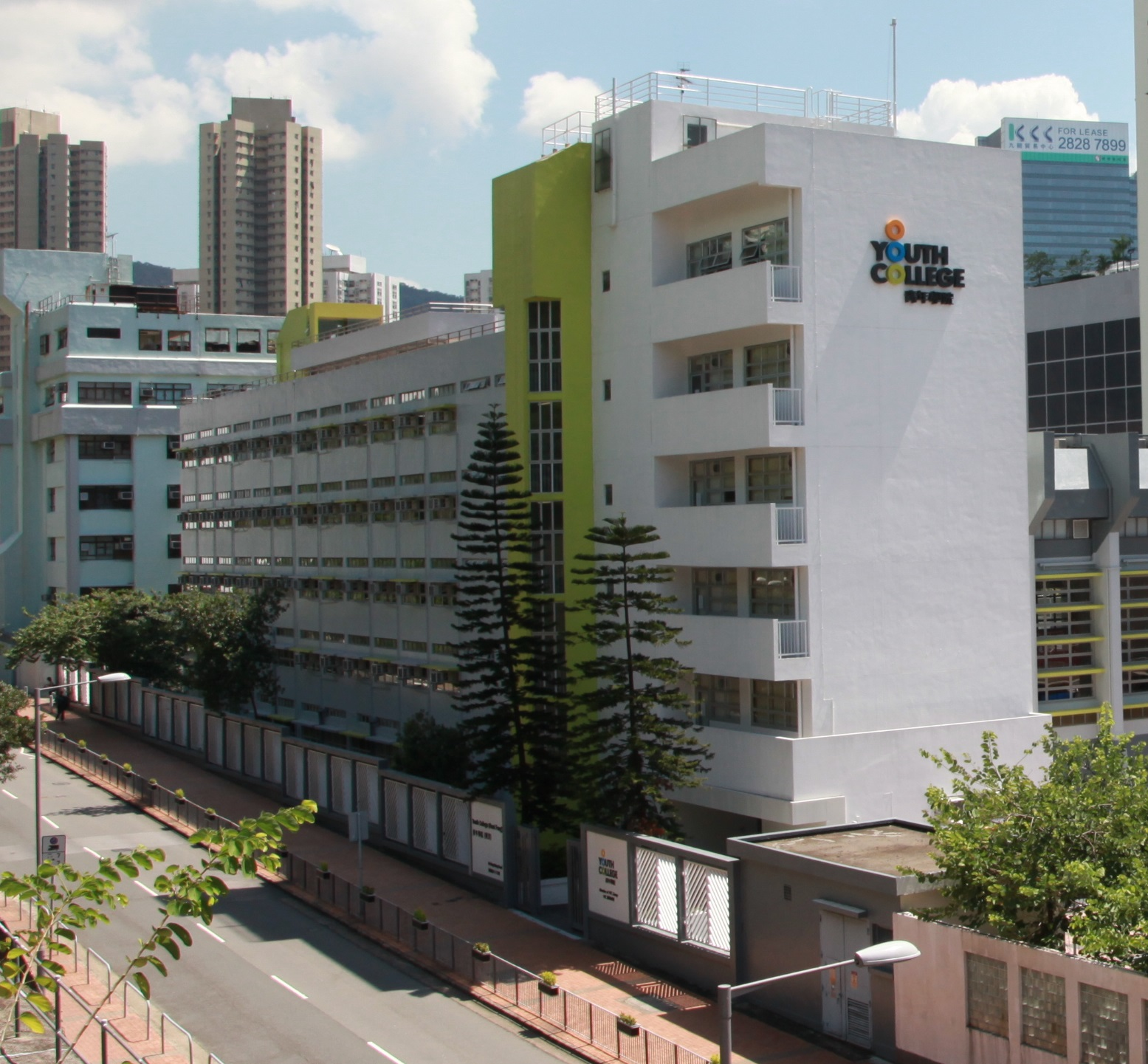
Kwai Fong Campus

There are seven Youth College campuses:

- Kowloon Bay (Kowloon Bay Training Centre Complex)
- Kwai Chung (Kwai Chung Training Centre Complex)
- Pokfulam (Pokfulam Training Centre Complex)
- Kwai Fong (relocated to Ha Kwai Chung Government Secondary School building in 2010. Located in Council of the Church of Christ Yenching College at So Uk Estate from 2004 to 2010)
- Tuen Mun (shared campus with Hong Kong Institute of Vocational Education (Tuen Mun))
- Yeo Chei Man (located in the former Yeo Chei Man Senior Secondary School)
- Tin Shui Wai (located in the former ho Ming Primary School)

== Programme ==
Full-time programme provided by Youth College:

The Diploma of Vocational Education Programme

Full-time Post-secondary 6 Programme Students who have completed Secondary 6 under the New Senior Secondary (NSS) Academic Structure are eligible for admission to this programme.

Full-time Post-secondary 3 Programme Students who have completed Secondary 3 are eligible for admission to this programme.

Furthermore, part-time programme provides long life learning opportunities for those who want to further study. Students can choose to take relevant modules according to their need of personal development. After accumulating certain amount of credit values, student can achieve different levels of qualifications. Therefore, students can attain higher level of qualification through a flexible progression pathways based on their own learning progress.

== Stream (Academic) ==
=== Scope of "Business and Services" ===
Business Beauty Care Fitness and Sports Studies

=== Scope of “Engineering” ===
- Computer-aided Product Engineering
- Mechanical Engineering
- Digital Electronics Technology
- Building Services Engineering
- Automotive Technology
- Aircraft Maintenance
- Electrical Engineering
- Construction
- Watch and Clock

=== Scope of "Design and Technology" ===
- Print Media
- Fashion Textile Design and Merchandising
- Interior and Exhibition Design
- Jewellery Arts & Design
- Information Technology
