= Hong Kong Institute of Vocational Education =

Higher education institution in Hong Kong

- Type: Public
- Established: 1969; 57 years ago
- Chairman: Tony Tai
- Director: Carrie Yau (Executive Director)
- Location: Hong Kong
- Campus: 9 campi
- Website: www.ive.edu.hk

Chinese name
- Simplified Chinese: 香港专业教育学院
- Traditional Chinese: 香港專業教育學院
Transcriptions
Standard Mandarin
- Hanyu Pinyin: Xiānggǎng Zhuānyèjiàoyù Xuéyuàn
Yue: Cantonese
- Yale Romanization: Hēunggóng Jyūnyihp Gaauyuhk Hohk'yún
- Jyutping: Hoeng1gong2 Zyun1jip6 Gaau3juk6 Hok6jyun2

The Hong Kong Institute of Vocational Education (IVE) is one of the member institutions of the Vocational Training Council (VTC) offering vocational education to post-secondary students in Hong Kong through its nine campi located across the territory.

Nine disciplines include applied science; business administration; child education and community services; construction; design, printing, textiles, and clothing; hotel, service, and tourism studies; information technology, electrical, and electronic engineering; and mechanical, manufacturing, and industrial engineering.

Graduates of IVE can either join the labour market society or choose to further their studies to obtain higher education qualifications.

== Campus ==
It has a total of nine campuses:

- Chai Wan (CW, formerly Hong Kong Technical College (Chai Wan))
- Morrison Hill (MH, formerly Morrison Hill Technical Institute)
- Kwun Tong (KT, formerly Kwun Tong Technical Institute)
- Lee Wai Lee (LWL, relocated to Tiu Keng Leng from Kowloon Tong since 2010–11 academic year), formerly Lee Wai Lee Technical Institute (located in Kowloon Tong, near Hong Kong Baptist University)
- Haking Wong (WHK, located in Cheung Sha Wan), formerly Haking Wong Technical Institute (located in Cheung Sha Wan)
- Kwai Chung (KC, formerly Kwai Chung Technical Institute)
- Tsing Yi (TY, formerly Hong Kong Technical College (Tsing Yi))
- Sha Tin (ST, formerly Sha Tin Technical Institute)
- Tuen Mun (TM, formerly Tuen Mun Technical Institute)

== Vocational Training Council ==
The Vocational Training Council (VTC) was established in 1982. There are 13 member institutions under the VTC Group: Technological and Higher Education Institute (THEi), Institute of Professional Education And Knowledge (PEAK), School for Higher and Professional Education (SHAPE), Hong Kong Institute of Vocational Education (IVE), Hong Kong Design Institute (HKDI), School of Business and Information Systems (SBI), Hospitality Industry Training and Development Centre (HITDC), Chinese Cuisine Training Institute (CCTI), Maritime Services Training Institute (MSTI), Youth College (YC), Training & Development Centre, Yeo Chei Man Senior Secondary School (YCM) and Skills Centre.

== See also ==
- Vocational Training Council
- Technological and Higher Education Institute of Hong Kong
- Higher education in Hong Kong
