= LRG Racing =

US motorcycle racing team

LRG Racing was established in 2006 by Lawrence R. Goldfarb, the CEO of LRG Capital Group. The LRG Racing team competes primarily in the American Federation of Motorcyclists (AFM), and exhibitions in other racing clubs. The LRG Racing team will compete in the Formula II, Formula III, 600 Production, and the 600 Superbike classes of the AFM. The team is based out of Larkspur, California.

== LRG Racing Team ==
Elaine Ou

- Manager, AFM #494
- Hometown: San Gabriel, CA
- Bike: 1998 Honda RS 125
- Age: 25, 2 years racing experience
- Class: Formula II, Formula III

Paul Yoshimune

- AFM # 650
- Bike: 2000 Suzuki GSX-R600
- Age: 37, 5 years racing experience
- Class: 600 Production, 600 Superbike

== LRG Racing 2007 Schedule ==
- March 24 & 25 at Buttonwillow Raceway Park
- April 28 & 29 at Infineon Raceway
- May 25 – 27 at Infineon Raceway
- July 7–8 at Thunderhill Park
- August 18 and 19 at Infineon Raceway
- September 8 & 9 at Thunderhill Park
- September 28 – 30 at Infineon Raceway
- October 20 – 21 at Buttonwillow Raceway Park

== LRG Racing Sponsors ==
- LRG Capital Group
- Collette Erickson Farmer & O’Neill LLP
- Lautze & Lautze CPA's & Financial Advisors
- Virgin Limo
- Network Gear Exchange, Inc.
- Keigwins@ the Track
