= Pro-Act by VTC =

Educational institution in Hong Kong

- 卓越培訓發展中心
- Established: 1984
- Students: 9,510 (2014/15)
- Location: Hong Kong
- Campus: Kowloon Bay Complex 46 Tai Yip Street, Kowloon Bay, Kowloon Kwai Chung Complex 13-19 San Kwai Street, Kwai Chung, New Territories Pokfulam Complex 145 Pokfulam Road, Hong Kong Island
- Website: Official website

Pro-Act by VTC
- Traditional Chinese: 卓越培訓發展中心
Transcriptions
Yue: Cantonese
- Yale Romanization: Cheuk yuht pùih fan faat jín jūng sām
- Jyutping: Coek3 jyut6 pui4 fan3 faat3 zin2 zung1 sam1

Pro-Act by VTC (Pro-Act) is a public post-secondary educational institution in Hong Kong that provides industry-specific training courses. The organisation was established in 1984 to provide practical training and professional development.
