= Les Roches hotel management school =

Coordinates: 46.4417°N 6.8890°E

Les Roches-Gruyère UAS
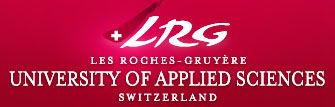
- Type: Private Hotel Management School
- Active: July 2008–July 2016
- President: Dr. Deborah Prince
- Faculty: 151
- Location: Bulle and Bluche, Switzerland
- Campus: Bluche and Bulle, Switzerland

Les Roches-Gruyère (LRG UAS) was a private hospitality school created by Glion Institute of Higher Education and Les Roches International School of Hotel Management, with two campuses located in the French-speaking parts of Switzerland. The institution was accredited by NECHE (US).

== Academic structure ==
The school program included a preparatory year where courses were focused on hotel operations in a craft-based learning environment and building experience through a hospitality industry internship.

Upon successful completion of the preparatory year students continued on to the administration and management modules for hospitality and service organizations.

== Campus ==
The preparatory year of the International Hotel Management specialization took place on the Glion-sur-Montreux campus of Glion Institute of Higher Education. Students then moved into the official Bachelor of Science in Hospitality Management program on the Bulle campus for the remaining three years. The entire Food, Beverage and Operations Management specialization took place on the Bluche campus. These institutions were not a part of LRG-UAS although the faculty, campuses and facilities such as the libraries and student housing are shared with these institutions.

=== Bulle campus ===
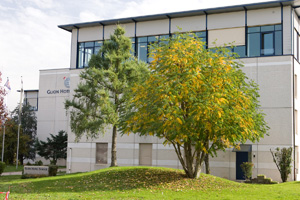
Bulle Campus

The three-year degree section of the Bachelor of Science in Hospitality Management with a specialization in International Hospitality Management took place on the Bulle Campus. The library had over 10,000 books and professional journals, thousands of CDs and DVDs and students can also access more than 15,000 on-line journals and publications. Bulle campus facilities include a catered restaurant, student lounge, and students have access to a fitness center through a school sponsored membership.

=== Bluche campus ===
Les Roches Bluche

This campus offered the specialization in Food, Beverage and Operations Management. This campus stretches across the village of Bluche in the heart of the Swiss Alps. The Bluche campus features three academic wings with 30 classrooms, two computer labs, one demonstration kitchen and demonstration bar, a reception and housekeeping practical classroom, mock hotel room, two professional kitchens and two auditoriums. The renovated library offers 10,000 academic titles and 2,000 DVDs and CDs in addition to the 15,000 online academic journals and the separate media center. Student accommodations are spread throughout the village in 16 separate buildings with different types of accommodations buildings. The Bluche campus provides a number of sport and recreational facilities.

== See also ==
- List of largest universities by enrollment in Switzerland
