= Chinese Culinary Institute =

Cooking school in Hong Kong focusing on Chinese cuisine

Coordinates: 22.260026°N 114.135620°E

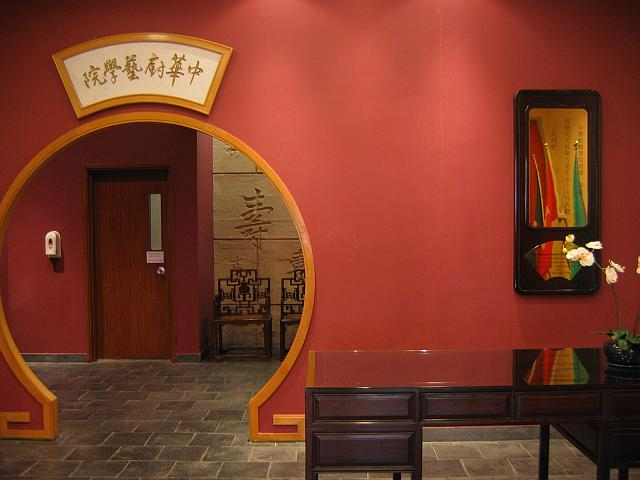
- the entrance of Chinese Culinary Institute
- Traditional Chinese: 中華廚藝學院
- Simplified Chinese: 中华厨艺学院
Transcriptions
Standard Mandarin
- Hanyu Pinyin: Zhōnghuá Chúyì Xuéyuàn
Yue: Cantonese
- Jyutping: zung1 waa4 cyu4 ngai6 hok6 jyun6*2

Chinese Culinary Institute (CCI) formerly known in English as Chinese Cuisine Training Institute (CCTI), is a public cooking school at Pok Fu Lam, Hong Kong. It is established and run by the Vocational Training Council of Hong Kong. It provides both full-time and part-time courses to beginners and practicing chefs in the industry who wish to obtain or upgrade their qualifications in Chinese cuisine.

== See also ==
- Vocational Training Council
