= Technological and Higher Education Institute of Hong Kong =

Public college in Hong Kong

Coordinates: 22.3410°N 114.1070°E

- 香港高等教育科技學院
- Type: Member institution of the VTC
- Established: 2012; 14 years ago
- President: Professor Alan Kin Tak LAU
- Location: Chai Wan and Tsing Yi, Hong Kong
- Website: www.thei.edu.hk

Chinese name
- Simplified Chinese: 香港高等教育科技学院
- Traditional Chinese: 香港高等教育科技學院
Transcriptions
Standard Mandarin
- Hanyu Pinyin: Xiānggǎng Gāoděng Jiàoyù Kējì Xuéyuàn
Yue: Cantonese
- Yale Romanization: Hēung góng gōu dáng gaau yuhk fō geih hohk yuhn
- Jyutping: Hoeng1 gong2 gou1 dang2 gaau3 juk6 fo1 gei6 hok6 jyun6

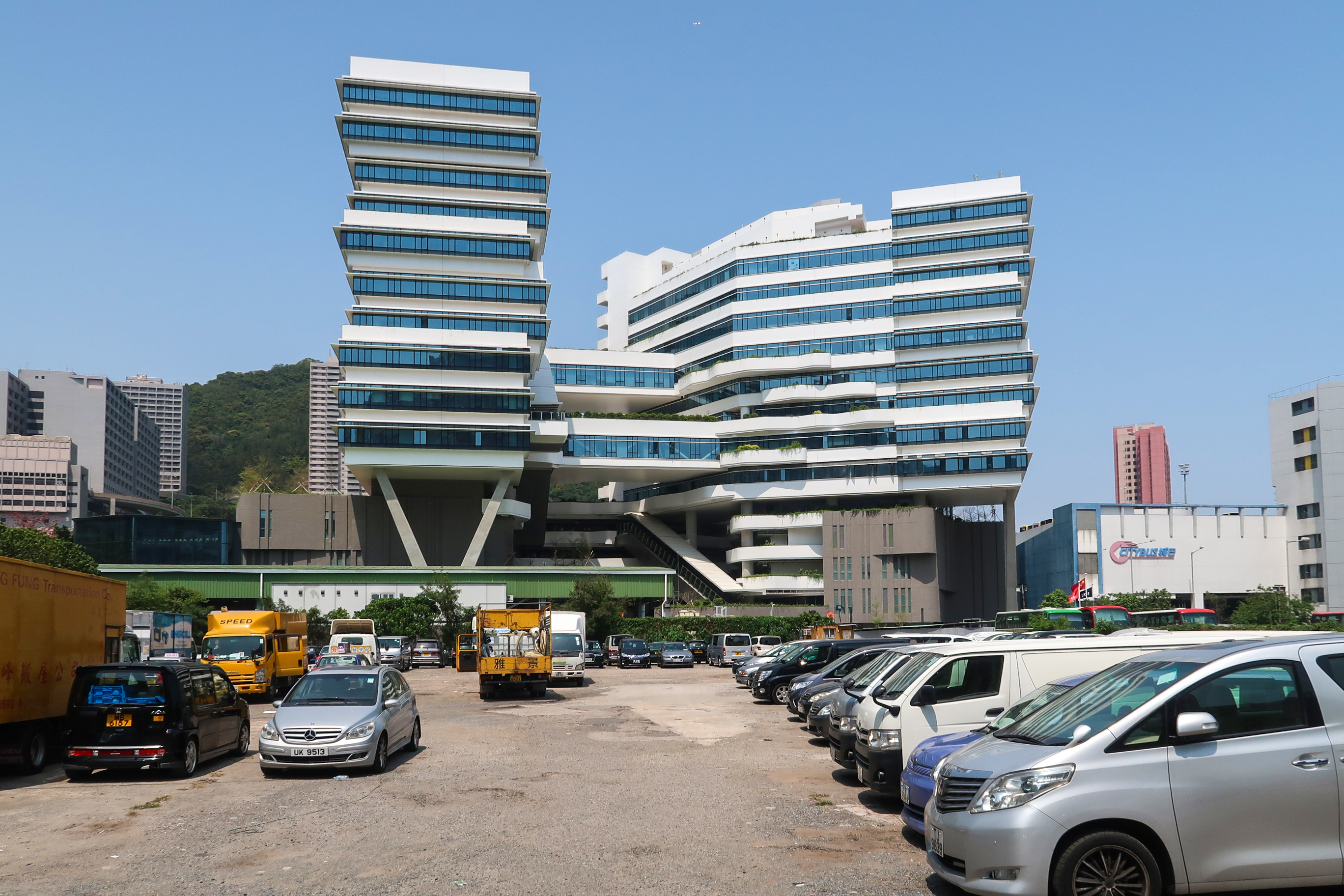
THEi Chai Wan main campus

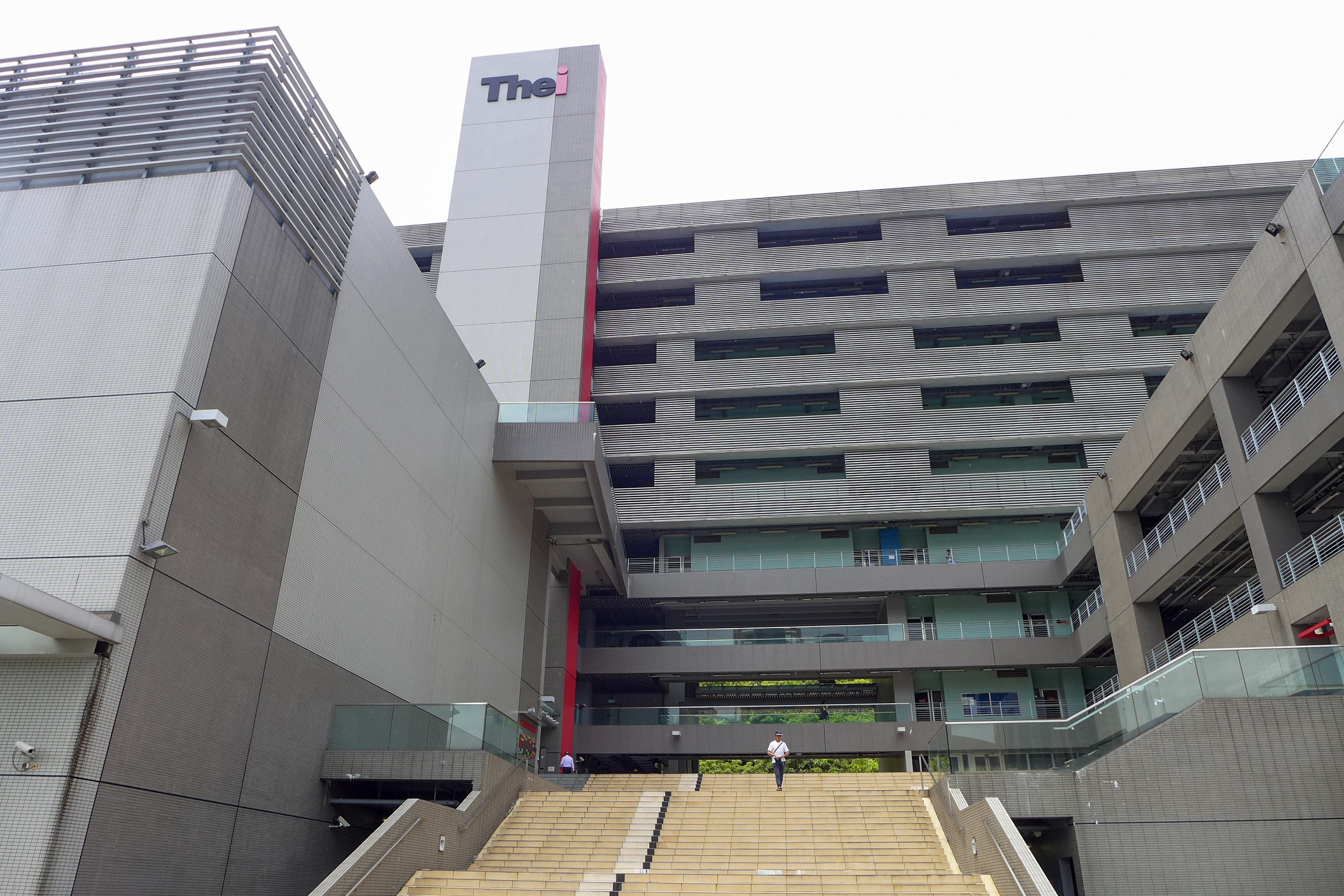
THEi Tsing Yi subsidiary campus

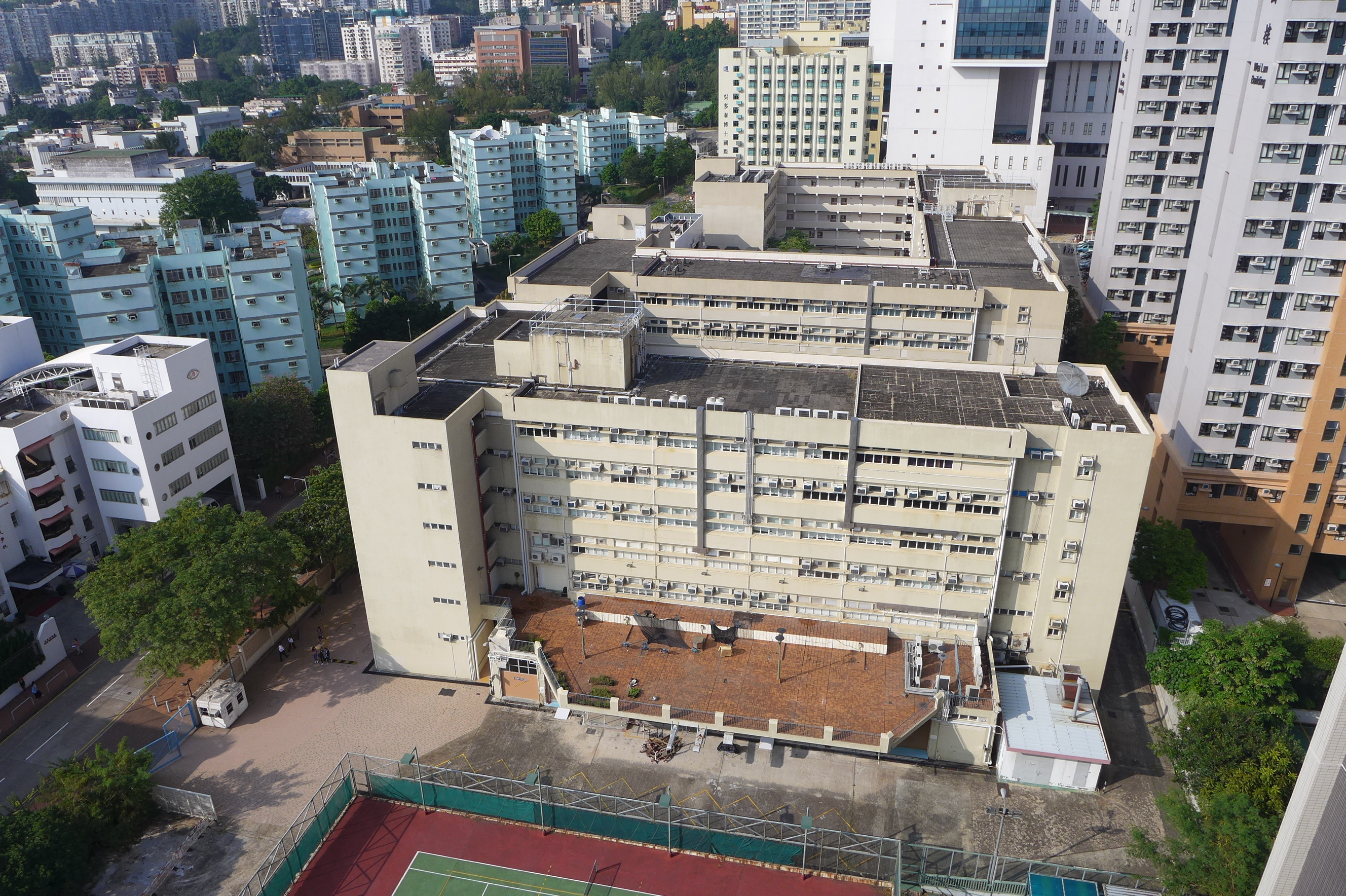
Former THEi Kowloon Tong campus

The Technological and Higher Education Institute of Hong Kong (THEi) is a public vocational college in Chai Wan, Hong Kong Island, Hong Kong. It is operated by the Vocational Training Council.

The institute provides vocationally-oriented bachelor's degree programmes for HKDSE candidates. Programmes offered by the six departments featuring a fine balance of theory, practice and general education with a focus on real-life projects and industrial attachments to develop competent professionals for the industry.

== Department of Design and Architecture ==
- Bachelor of Arts (Honours) in Digital Advertising
- Bachelor of Arts (Honours) in Fashion Design
- Bachelor of Arts (Honours) in Product Design
- Bachelor of Arts (Honours) in Landscape Architecture
- Bachelor of Science (Honours) in Surveying
- Professional Diploma in Landscape Architecture
- Master of Arts in Landscape Architecture

== Department of Digital Innovation and Technology ==
- Bachelor of Science (Honours) in Information and Communications Technology
- Bachelor of Science (Honours) in Multimedia Technology and Innovation

=== Department of Hospitality and Business Management ===
- Bachelor of Arts (Honours) in Culinary Arts and Management
- Bachelor of Arts (Honours) in Hotel Operations Management
- Bachelor of Arts (Honours) in Professional Accounting
- Bachelor of Arts (Honours) in Public Relations and Management

=== Department of Sport and Recreation ===
- Bachelor of Social Sciences (Honours) in Sports and Recreation Management

=== Department of Construction, Environment and Engineering ===
- Bachelor of Engineering (Honours) in Civil Engineering
- Bachelor of Engineering (Honours) in Aircraft Engineering
- Bachelor of Engineering (Honours) in Building Services Engineering
- Bachelor of Engineering (Honours) in Green Engineering and Sustainability
- Bachelor of Science (Honours) Horticulture, Arboriculture and Landscape Management
- Professional Diploma in Building Information Modelling
- Professional Diploma in Building Services Engineering
- Professional Diploma Horticulture, Arboriculture and Landscape Management
- Professional Diploma Meister Lift and Escalator Engineering
- Professional Diploma Meister Power Electrical Engineering
- Professional Certificate in Turfgrass Science and Management

=== Department of Food and Health Sciences ===
- Bachelor of Science (Honours) in Chinese Medicinal Pharmacy
- Bachelor of Science (Honours) in Food Science and Safety
- Bachelor of Science (Honours) in Nutrition and Healthcare Management
- Bachelor of Science (Honours) in Testing and Certification

== Campuses ==
- Chai Wan Main Campus: 133 Shing Tai Road, Chai Wan, Hong Kong Island
- Tsing Yi Campus: 20A Tsing Yi Road, Tsing Yi, New Territories

== Notable people ==
- Lee Wai Lok (Smilingboris) – Famous YouTuber in Hong Kong

== See also ==
- Education in Hong Kong
- Higher education in Hong Kong
