= LRG Capital Funds =

American private equity firm

LRG Capital Funds (formerly BayStar Capital Funds)
- Type: Private Ownership
- Industry: Private Equity
- Founded: 1999
- Founder: Lawrence R. Goldfarb
- Headquarters: San Francisco, California, United States
- Products: Private equity funds, Leveraged buyouts
- Website: www.lrgcapital.com

The LRG Capital Funds (formerly BayStar Capital Funds) are managed by LRG Capital Group, LLC. Through its BayStar Capital III Investment Fund, a multi-strategy investment fund, the firm makes direct investments in small-to mid capitalization, public and late-stage private companies, primarily within the technology and life sciences sectors.

The firm is a business unit of LRG Capital Group is an investment, banking and advisory boutique that focuses on public and private companies in the technology, life sciences, hospitality, real estate and entertainment sectors. The firm was founded by former CS First Boston investment banker Lawrence R. Goldfarb.

Headquartered in San Francisco, with offices in New York City and Miami.

== Investments ==
The BayStar Capital III Investment Fund states it invests in public companies (such as Glasshouse Technologies, Inc. and Virtualscopics) that it perceives as having a long term viable business model.

Prior BayStar Capital Funds have collectively invested over $1.5 billion of equity in more than 250 companies.

== See also ==
- Baystar involvement in the SCO affair
