= Wong Yuk-shan =

- 黃玉山
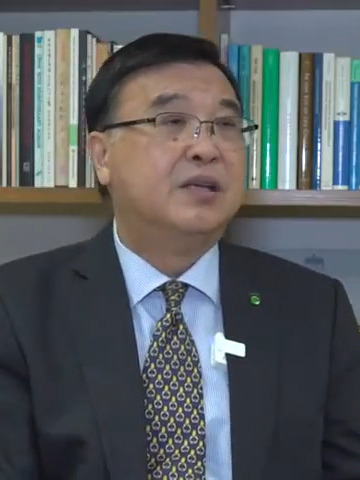

Member of National People's Congress
- In office 5 March 2008 – 11 March 2023

President of the Open University of Hong Kong
- In office 1 April 2014 – 31 March 2021
- Preceded by: John Leong Chi-yan
- Succeeded by: Paul Lam Kwan-sing

Personal details
- Born: Xiamen, Fujian, China
- Education: Concordia University, B.A. McGill University, M.Sc, Ph.D.

Professor Wong Yuk-shan, SBS, BBS, JP (Chinese: 黃玉山) is a Hong Kong politician and academic. He is the former president of the Open University of Hong Kong, a Hong Kong deputy of the National People's Congress of China and its member of the Committee of the Hong Kong Basic Law.

== Biography ==
Professor Wong was born in Hong Kong in 1950; his ancestral home is located in Fujian, mainland China. He graduated from Concordia University with a bachelor's degree in biology in 1974, before obtaining a master's and doctoral degree in Plant Biochemistry from McGill University in 1976 and 1979 respectively. From the 1980s, Wong has performed teaching, research and administration work at various universities, namely the Hong Kong Polytechnic University, Chinese University of Hong Kong, City University of Hong Kong and the Hong Kong University of Science and Technology. He has published 8 books and over 160 international journal papers in the areas of environmental biotechnology, plant biochemistry and mangrove conservation. He is a Fellow of the Society of Biology in the UK and a Fellow of the Hong Kong Institution of Science.

He has been a Hong Kong deputy of the National People's Congress since 2008 and a member of its Committee of the Hong Kong Basic Law. He has also held various public positions, including member of the Basic Law Promotion Steering Committee, chairman of the Education Bureau's Vetting Committee for the Allocation of Sites and Start-up Loan for Post-secondary Education Providers, the president of the Society of Hong Kong Scholars, chairman of the Veterinary Surgeons Board of Hong Kong, Deputy Chairman of the Advisory Council for the Environment, Chairman of Wetland Advisory Committee and member of the executive board of the Hong Kong Institution of Science. In 2001 he was appointed chairman of the Curriculum Development Council, a member of the University Grants Committee, a member of Education Commission and a member of the Hong Kong Council for Accreditation of Academic and Vocational Qualifications. He was appointed chairman of the Consumer Council in 2013 and chairman of the Standing Committee on Judicial Salaries and Conditions of Service in 2017.

Wong was appointed Justice of Peace in 2001 and received a Bronze Bauhinia Star medal in 2004. He received a Silver Bauhinia Star medal in 2018.

Political offices
Preceded by Anthony Cheung	Chairman of Hong Kong Consumer Council; 2013–present	Incumbent
Academic offices
Preceded by John Leong	President of Open University of Hong Kong; 2014–present	Incumbent
