= List of post-nominal letters (Hong Kong) =

Post-nominal letters in Hong Kong include:

== Orders, decorations and appointments ==
Office	Post-nominal (Note: Those individuals who received British Honours prior to the handover may continue to wear the order and/or use the related post-nominal letters, however, these are not officially recognised by the Government of Hong Kong.)
General Awards
Grand Bauhinia Medal	GBM (Holders are entitled to the title 'The Honourable')
Gold Bauhinia Star	GBS
Silver Bauhinia Star	SBS
Bronze Bauhinia Star	BBS
Medal of Honour	MH
Gallantry Awards
Medal for Bravery (Gold)	MBG
Medal for Bravery (Silver)	MBS
Medal for Bravery (Bronze)	MBB
Disciplined Services and ICAC Awards
Hong Kong Police Medal for Distinguished Service	PDSM
Hong Kong Fire Services Medal for Distinguished Service	FSDSM
Hong Kong Immigration Service Medal for Distinguished Service	IDSM
Hong Kong Customs and Excise Medal for Distinguished Service	CDSM
Hong Kong Correctional Services Medal for Distinguished Service	CSDSM
Government Flying Service Medal for Distinguished Service	GDSM
Hong Kong ICAC Medal for Distinguished Service	IDS
Hong Kong Police Medal for Meritorious Service	PMSM
Hong Kong Fire Services Medal for Meritorious Service	FSMSM
Hong Kong Immigration Service Medal for Meritorious Service	IMSM
Hong Kong Customs and Excise Medal for Meritorious Service	CMSM
Hong Kong Correctional Services Medal for Meritorious Service	CSMSM
Government Flying Service Medal for Meritorious Service	GMSM
Hong Kong ICAC Medal for Meritorious Service	IMS
Appointments
Justice of the Peace	JP
Senior Counsel (Note: Senior Counsel is a replacement for the title of Queen's Counsel. Those individuals who had achieved the status of QC may continue to employ the letters in addition to SC.)	SC

== Learned societies ==
Learned society	Post-nominal
Fellowship, Membership and Associate Membership of Professional Institutions
Member of Hong Kong Association for Applied Linguists	MHAAL
Fellow of Hong Kong Institute of Planners	FHKIP
Member of Hong Kong Institute of Planners	MHKIP
Associate Member of Hong Kong Institution of Engineers	AMHKIE
Member of Hong Kong Institution of Engineers	MHKIE
Fellow of Hong Kong Institution of Engineers	FHKIE
Grade A Register Electrical Worker in Design and Installation of registered with the Electrical and Mechanical Services Department (EMSD) of the Hong Kong Government	REW A0
Grade A Register Electrical Worker in Design only of registered with the Electrical and Mechanical Services Department (EMSD) of the Hong Kong Government	REW A1
Grade A Register Electrical Worker in Installation only of registered with the Electrical and Mechanical Services Department (EMSD) of the Hong Kong Government	REW A2
Grade B Register Electrical Worker in Design and Installation of registered with the Electrical and Mechanical Services Department (EMSD) of the Hong Kong Government	REW B0
Grade B Register Electrical Worker in Design only of registered with the Electrical and Mechanical Services Department (EMSD) of the Hong Kong Government	REW B1
Grade A Register Electrical Worker in Installation only of registered with the Electrical and Mechanical Services Department (EMSD) of the Hong Kong Government	REW B2
Grade C Register Electrical Worker in Design and Installation of registered with the Electrical and Mechanical Services Department (EMSD) of the Hong Kong Government	REW C0
Grade C Register Electrical Worker in Design only of registered with the Electrical and Mechanical Services Department (EMSD) of the Hong Kong Government	REW C1
Grade C Register Electrical Worker in Installation only of registered with the Electrical and Mechanical Services Department (EMSD) of the Hong Kong Government	REW C2
Grade H Register Electrical Worker in Design and Installation of registered with the Electrical and Mechanical Services Department (EMSD) of the Hong Kong Government	REW H0
Grade H Register Electrical Worker in Design only of registered with the Electrical and Mechanical Services Department (EMSD) of the Hong Kong Government	REW H1
Grade H Register Electrical Worker in Installation only of registered with the Electrical and Mechanical Services Department (EMSD) of the Hong Kong Government	REW H2
Grade R Register Electrical Worker in Design and Installation of registered with the Electrical and Mechanical Services Department (EMSD) of the Hong Kong Government	REW R0
Grade R Register Electrical Worker in Design only of registered with the Electrical and Mechanical Services Department (EMSD) of the Hong Kong Government	REW R1
Grade R Register Electrical Worker in Installation only of registered with the Electrical and Mechanical Services Department (EMSD) of the Hong Kong Government	REW R2
Registered Professional Engineer of the Engineers Registration Board	RPE
Associate Member of Hong Kong Institute of Housing	-----
Member of Hong Kong Institute of Housing	MHKIH
Fellow of Hong Kong Institute of Housing	FHKIH
Honorary Fellow of Hong Kong Institute of Housing	Hon FHKIH
Member of the Hong Kong Institute of Certified Public Accountants	CPA
Fellow of the Hong Kong Institute of Certified Public Accountants	FCPA
Fellow of The Hong Kong Chartered Governance Institute	HKFCG
Associate of The Hong Kong Chartered Governance Institute	HKACG
Practitioner's Endorsement by The Hong Kong Chartered Governance Institute	(PE)
Associate Member of the Hong Kong Institute of Directors	AHKIoD
Member of the Hong Kong Institute of Directors	MHKIoD
Fellow of the Hong Kong Institute of Directors	FHKIoD
Member of Hong Kong Management Association	MHKMA
Associate Member of Hong Kong Quality Management Association	AHKQMA
Member of Hong Kong Quality Management Association	MHKQMA
Fellow of Hong Kong Quality Management Association	FHKQMA
Registered Quality Professional (Six Sigma Champion) of the Six Sigma Institute	RQP (SSC)
Registered Quality Professional (Green Belt) of the Six Sigma Institute	RQP (GB)
Registered Quality Professional (Black Belt) of the Six Sigma Institute	RQP (BB)
Registered Service Quality Professional (Black Belt) of the Six Sigma Institute	RSQP (BB)
Registered Quality Professional (Master Black Belt) of the Six Sigma Institute	RQP (MBB)
Registered Six Sigma Organisation of the Six Sigma Institute	----
Registered Quality Professional (Lean Leader) of the Six Sigma Institute	RQP (LL)
Registered Quality Professional (Lean Black Belt) of the Six Sigma Institute	(LBB)
Distinguished Fellow Member of the Hong Kong Computer Society	Distinguished FHKCS
Associate Member of the Hong Kong Computer Society	AHKCS
Member of the Hong Kong Computer Society	MHKCS
Fellow of the Hong Kong Computer Society	FHKCS
Associate Member of Hong Kong Institute of Human Resource Management	------
Member of Hong Kong Institute of Human Resource Management	M.I.H.R.M.(HK)
Fellow of Hong Kong Institute of Human Resource Management	F.I.H.R.M.(HK)
Associate Member of Hong Kong Institution of Certified Auditors	AMHKICA
Member of Hong Kong Institution of Certified Auditors	MHKICA
Fellow of Hong Kong Institution of Certified Auditors	FHKICA
Associate Member of Institute of Purchasing & Supply of Hong Kong	AIPSHK
Member of Institute of Purchasing & Supply of Hong Kong	MIPSHK
Honorary Fellow of Institute of Purchasing & Supply of Hong Kong	FIPSHK(Hon.)
Associate Member of Hong Kong Logistics Association	AHKLA
Graduate Member of Hong Kong Logistics Association	Grad. HKLA
Member of Hong Kong Logistics Association	MHKLA
Professional Member of Hong Kong Logistics Association	PMHKLA
Fellow Member of Hong Kong Logistics Association	FHKLA
Honorary Fellow Member of Hong Kong Institution of Occupational and Environmental Hygiene	FHKIOEH (Honorary)
Fellow Member of Hong Kong Institution of Occupational and Environmental Hygiene	FHKIOEH
Member of Hong Kong Institution of Occupational and Environmental Hygiene	MHKIOEH
Registered Safety Officer With the Labour Department of the Hong Kong Government	RSO
Registered Safety Auditor With the Labour Department of the Hong Kong Government	RSA
Fellow Member of Hong Kong Institute of Environmental Impact Assessment	FHKIEIA
Member of Hong Kong Institute of Environmental Impact Assessment	MHKIEIA
Fellow Member of Hong Kong Management Association	FHKMA
Member of Hong Kong Management Association	MHKMA
Professional Manager of Hong Kong Management Association	PMgr
Fellow of The Hong Kong Institute of Surveyors	FHKIS
Member of The Hong Kong Institute of Surveyors	MHKIS
Associate of the Hong Kong Institute of Arbitrators	AHKIArb
Fellow of the Hong Kong Institute of Arbitrators	FHKIArb

== Higher education degrees ==
University degrees (Note: The exact post-nominal for university degrees varies based on the faculty in which the degree was obtained)
Doctorate	Ed.D., DPhil, PhD, MD, LLD, JD, DBA, DMus, MS etc.
Master's degree	MA, MArch, MPharm, MPhil, MSc, MEng, MFin, MSocSc, MMus, LLM, eMBA, MBA, MEd, MCh, MSW etc.
Bachelor's degree	BA, BSc, LLB, BEng, MBBS, BSS, BArch, BEd, BABEd, BEdBSc, BEdBSocSc, BBA etc.
University diplomas
Postgraduate diploma	PDES, PGDE, etc.
Postgraduate certificate	PCEd, PCAES, PCLL, etc.
University alumni
University of Hong Kong	HKU
Hong Kong University of Science and Technology	HKUST
City University of Hong Kong	CityU
Chinese University of Hong Kong	CUHK
Hong Kong Polytechnic University	PolyU
Education University of Hong Kong	EdUHK
Open University of Hong Kong (1997-2021)	OUHK
Hong Kong Metropolitan University (2021-)	MU
Lingnan University	LU
Hong Kong Baptist University	HKBU

== Professional licenses, certificates, and qualifications ==
Registered Teacher	RT
Permitted Teacher	PT
Registered Nurse	RN
Registered Social Worker	RSW
Language Proficiency Assessment for Teachers	LPAT
Registered Professional Surveyor of the Surveyors Registration Board	RPS
Registered Professional Engineer of the Engineers Registration Board	RPE
