= Paul Lam Kwan-sing =

Hong Kong academic

- 林群聲

President of the Hong Kong Metropolitan University
- Incumbent
- Assumed office 1 April 2014
- Preceded by: Wong Yuk-shan

Paul Lam Kwan-sing (Chinese: 林群聲), is a Hong Kong academic, chair professor of environmental chemistry, and the current President of the Hong Kong Metropolitan University.
