= Federation for Self-financing Tertiary Education =

- 自資高等教育聯盟
- Formation: 1994
- Legal status: Non-statutory body
- Headquarters: Hong Kong
- Region served: Hong Kong
- Chairman: Professor Peter Yuen, PolyU
- Website: www.fste.edu.hk

Federation for Self-financing Tertiary Education
- Traditional Chinese: 自資高等教育聯盟
Transcriptions
Yue: Cantonese
- Yale Romanization: Jih jī gōu dáng gaau yuhk lyùhn màhng
- Jyutping: Zi^{6} zi^{1} gou^{1} dang^{2} gaau^{3} juk^{6} lyun^{4} mang^{4}

The Federation for Self-financing Tertiary Education (FSTE) is a higher education institutions alliance in Hong Kong. The alliance was established as The Federation for Continuing Education in Tertiary Institutions (FCE) in 1994. The FSTE aims to advance the quality, promote collaboration and share practices in the self-financing tertiary education sector in Hong Kong.

== Members ==
The FSTE comprises 17 publicly funded higher education institutions and major non-profit-making institutions providing tertiary or continuing education in Hong Kong.

1. Caritas Hong Kong
2. Chu Hai College
3. City University of Hong Kong
4. Hong Kong Baptist University
5. Hong Kong College of Technology
6. Hong Kong Institute of Technology
7. Lingnan University
8. The Chinese University of Hong Kong
9. The Education University of Hong Kong
10. The Hong Kong Polytechnic University
11. The Hong Kong University of Science and Technology
12. The Open University of Hong Kong
13. The University of Hong Kong
14. Tung Wah College
15. UOW College Hong Kong
16. Vocational Training Council
17. Yew Chung College of Early Childhood Education

== Committees ==
The FSTE has five committees.

- Executive Committee
- Membership and Membership Development Committee
- Research and Development Committee
- Recruitment and Student Affairs Committee
- Diploma Yi Jin Programme Management Committee

== See also ==
- Education in Hong Kong
- Higher education in Hong Kong
