= Tung Wah College =

Private college in Kowloon, Hong Kong

- 東華學院
- Type: Higher education institution
- Established: 2010; 16 years ago
- Affiliations: Tung Wah Group of Hospitals; Alliance of Universities of Applied Sciences; Federation for Self-financing Tertiary Education; JUPAS
- Chairperson: Mr. Tseng Hing Yip York
- President: Professor Sally Chan
- Vice-president: Professor David Man Vice President (Academic); Dr. George Lau Vice President (Admin. & Development); Vacant Vice President (Research and Innovation); Professor Rick Kwan Associate Vice President (Academic); Mr. Patrick Ho Associate Vice President (Admin. & Development); Vacant Associate Vice President (Research and Innovation)
- Academic staff: 189 (2025/2026 academic year)
- Students: 4,885 (2025/2026 academic year)
- Undergraduates: 4,168 (2025/2026 academic year)
- Location: King's Park, Mong Kok, Kwai Hing and Tsim Sha Tsui, Hong Kong
- Campus: Urban
- Nickname: TWC
- Website: twc.edu.hk

Tung Wah College
- Traditional Chinese: 東華學院
- Simplified Chinese: 东华学院
Transcriptions
Standard Mandarin
- Hanyu Pinyin: dōnghuá xuéyuàn
Yue: Cantonese
- Yale Romanization: Dūngwàh hohkyuhn
- Jyutping: Dung^{1} waa^{4} hok^{6} jyun^{6*2}

Tung Wah College (TWC; Chinese: 東華學院) is a private, self-financing college in King's Park, Kowloon, Hong Kong. It was established by the Tung Wah Group of Hospitals in 2010 and registered under the Post-Secondary Colleges Ordinance (Cap 320).

TWC has 4 schools (namely the School of Management, School of Medical and Health Sciences, School of Arts and Humanities and School of Nursing) offering 20 degree, sub-degree, diploma and certificate programmes. It has a student population of over 4,500.

== History ==
2010

- The beginning of the year, the Board of Directors of the TWGHs formally established 'Tung Wah Tertiary Institute'.^{[4]}

2011

- The institute was renamed the Tung Wah College in April.
- In May, the college was accredited by Hong Kong Council for Accreditation of Academic and Vocational Qualifications and recognised by the Education Bureau.
- In September, Bachelor of Business Administration (Honours) was launched.

2012

- The college started to offer the Bachelor of Health Sciences (Honours) (majoring in nursing), Bachelor of Social Sciences (Honours) (majoring in psychology), Associate of Health Studies and Associate of Social Science.

2013

- The college started to offer Bachelor of Medical Health Sciences (Honours) (majoring in basic medical science, forensic science, medical laboratory science and radiation therapy).

2014

- The Education Bureau announced that the Bachelor of Health Science (Honours) in Nursing would be included in the Study Subsidy Scheme for Designated Professions/Sectors (SSSDP) funded by the Government starting from the 2015/2016 academic year.

2015

- A new academic structure with the establishment of 4 schools (namely Arts and Humanities, Business, Medical and Health Sciences, and Nursing) was implemented to facilitate the college's development into a private university.

2016

- The programmes of Bachelor of Science (Honours) in Medical Laboratory Science and Bachelor of Science (Honours) in Radiation Therapy were recognised respectively by the Medical Laboratory Technologists Board and the Radiographers Board under the Supplementary Medical Professions Council, among the earliest such programs offered by a self-financing institution in Hong Kong. The Education Bureau announced that the two programmes would be included in the Study Subsidy Scheme for Designated Professions/Sectors (SSSDP) funded by the Government starting from 2017/2018 academic year.

2017

- Bachelor of Science (Honours) in Occupational Therapy was recognised by the Occupational Therapists Board under the Supplementary Medical Professions Council. The college became the first self-financing institution to offer professionally accredited occupational therapy programme. The Education Bureau announced that the programme would be included in the SSSDP funded by the Government starting from 2018/2019 academic year.
- Bachelor of Education (Honours) in Early Childhood Education was launched. The college became the first self-financing institution registered under the Post Secondary Colleges Ordinance (Cap. 320) to offer accredited early childhood education degree programme.

2018

- Bachelor of Science (Honours) in Physiotherapy was launched. The college became the first self-financing institution registered under the Post Secondary Colleges Ordinance (Cap. 320) to offer such degree programme. The Education Bureau announced that the programme would be included in the SSSDP funded by the Government starting from 2019/2020 academic year.

2019

- The Bachelor of Management (Honours) in Social and Business Sustainability, launched in 2019, focuses on sustainability principles in business and social contexts.

2020

- Prof. Yu-hon Lui concluded his tenure as the President of TWC in March. The Vice President (Academic), Prof. Lawrence Lam and the Acting Vice President (Administration & Development), Mr. Patrick Ho, served as the Acting Presidents of the college until the arrival of the new president.
- TWC acquired the first programme area accreditation status for the programme area of Occupational Therapy at QF Level 5, supporting its goal to become a private university.

2021

- The Board of Governors of Tung Wah College appointed Professor Sally Chan as the third President.
- Bachelor of Science (Honours) in Applied Gerontology was selected for Pilot Project on the Development of Applied Degree Programmes. The Education Bureau announced that the programme would be included in the SSSDP funded by the Government starting from 2022/2023 academic year.

2022

- Bachelor of Science (Honours) in Physiotherapy was recognised by the Supplementary Medical Professions Council, making it the first self-financing bachelor of science in physiotherapy programme to receive professional recognition.
- Bachelor of Health Information and Services Management (Honours) was launched in 2022/2023.

2023

- The Social Welfare Department (SWD) has commissioned Tung Wah College to provide 150 fully-subsidised places from 2023/2024 to 2027/2028 in respect of the Higher Diploma in Nursing (HD (Nursing)) programme.
- The Board of Governors of Tung Wah College appointed Professor David Man as Vice-President (Academic).
- Bachelor of Health Information and Services Management (Honours) has been selected by the Education Bureau for the second round of the Pilot Project on the Development of Applied Degree Programmes. The Education Bureau announced that the programme would be included in the SSSDP funded by the Government starting from 2024/2025 academic year.

2024

- Bachelor of Science (Honours) in Medical Imaging was launched in the academic year 2024/2025.

== Programmes ==
All programmes offered by the college are approved and accredited by the Hong Kong Council for Accreditation of Academic and Vocational Qualifications. The list of courses offered is as follows:

=== School of Management ===
- Bachelor of Management (Honours) in Social and Business Sustainability
- Bachelor of Health Information and Services Management (Honours) (JUPAS Programme code: JSST07)
- Master of Smart Health Services Management (MSHSM)

=== School of Medical and Health Sciences ===
- Bachelor of Science (Honours) in Biomedical Science
- Bachelor of Science (Honours) in Forensic Biomedical Science
- Bachelor of Science (Honours) in Medical Imaging (JUPAS Programme code: JSST08)
- Bachelor of Science (Honours) in Medical Laboratory Science (JUPAS Programme code: JSST02)
- Bachelor of Science (Honours) in Occupational Therapy (JUPAS Programme code: JSST04)
- Bachelor of Science (Honours) in Physiotherapy (JUPAS Programme code: JSST05)
- Bachelor of Science (Honours) in Radiation Therapy (JUPAS Programme code: JSST03)
- Higher Diploma in Health Science

=== School of Arts and Humanities ===
- Bachelor of Education (Honours) in Early Childhood Education
- Bachelor of Science (Honours) in Applied Gerontology (JUPAS Programme code: JSST06)
- Bachelor of Social Science (Honours) in Applied Psychology
- Higher Diploma in Early Childhood Education
- Higher Diploma in Psychology
- Diploma in Health Studies

=== School of Nursing ===
- Doctor of Philosophy in Nursing (PhD(N))
- Bachelor of Health Science (Honours) in Nursing (JUPAS Programme code: JSST01)
- Higher Diploma in Nursing (SWD)
- Higher Diploma in Nursing (SSSDP)
- Certificate in Endoscopy Care
