= Hong Kong Metropolitan University =

Public university in Kowloon, Hong Kong

Coordinates: 22.3162°N 114.18°E

- 香港都會大學
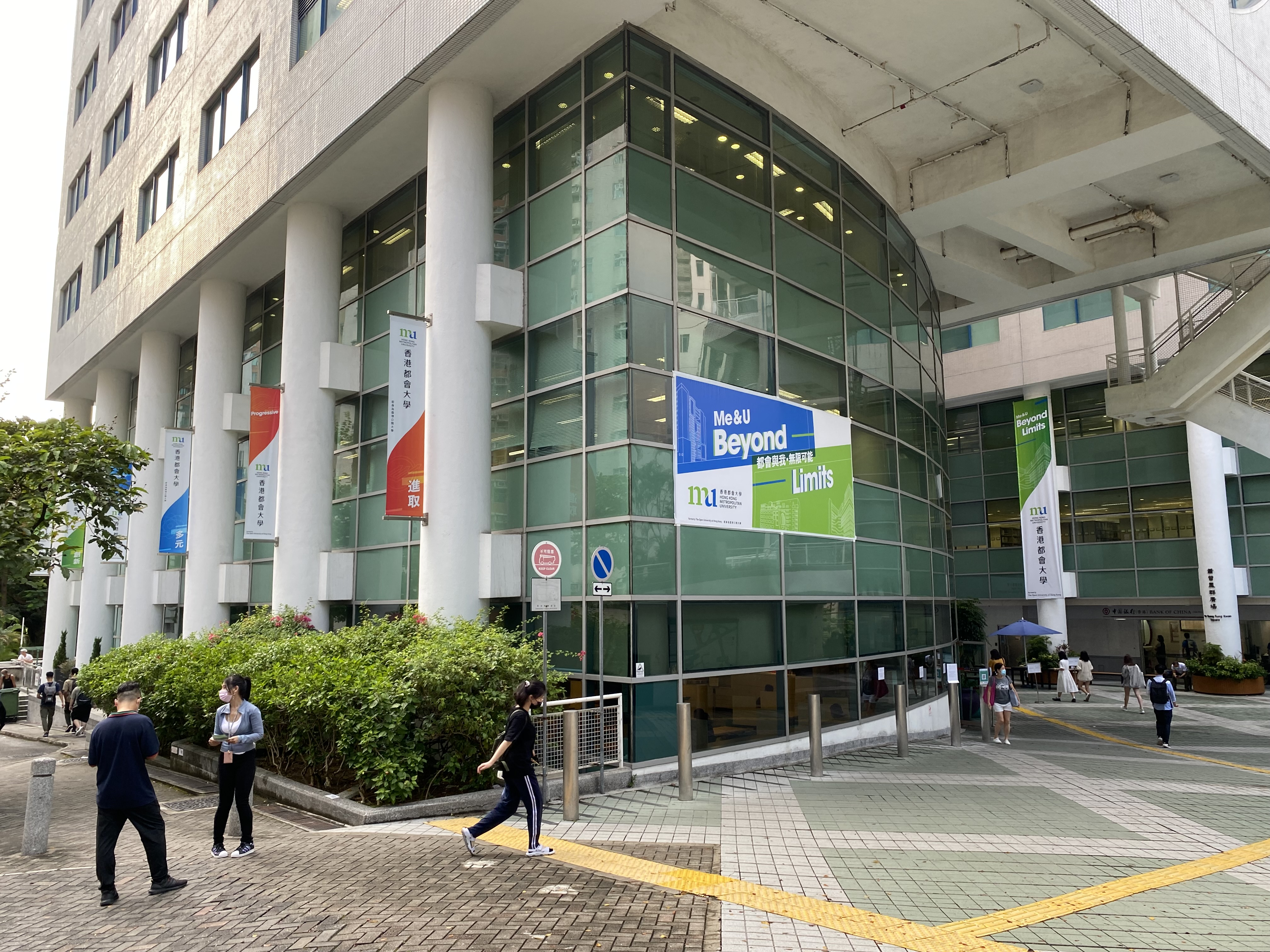
- Former names: Open Learning Institute of Hong Kong (1989–1997); The Open University of Hong Kong (1997–2021)
- Motto: 勵學致遠 敬慎日新 (Chinese); Transcendence through Erudition and Renewal (English)
- Type: Public, self-financing
- Established: 1989; 37 years ago (as Open Learning Institute of Hong Kong); 1997; 29 years ago (with full university status)
- Affiliations: International Council for Open and Distance Education (ICDE); JUPAS; Guangdong–Hong Kong–Macao University Alliance (GHMUA); Jiangsu-Hong Kong-Macau Universities Alliance (JHMUA); Federation for Self-financing Tertiary Education; Alliance of Universities of Applied Sciences
- Chancellor: John Lee Ka-chiu
- President: Paul Lam Kwan-sing
- Vice-president: Prof. Reggie Kwan Ching-ping (Provost); Prof. Lui Yu-hon (Resources & Development); Prof. Ricky Kwok Yu-kwong (Students & Support)
- Students: 20,024 (2024)
- Location: 30 Good Shepherd Street, Ho Man Tin, Kowloon, Hong Kong
- Campus: Urban
- Colors
- Website: www.hkmu.edu.hk

Chinese name
- Traditional Chinese: 香港都會大學
- Simplified Chinese: 香港都会大学
- Cantonese Yale: Hēunggóng Dōuwúi Daaihhohk
Transcriptions
Standard Mandarin
- Hanyu Pinyin: Xiānggǎng Dūhuì Dàxué
Yue: Cantonese
- Yale Romanization: Hēunggóng Dōuwúi Daaihhohk
- Jyutping: Hoeng1 gong2 dou1 wui2 daai6 hok6

Alternative Chinese name
- Traditional Chinese: 香港公開大學
- Simplified Chinese: 香港公开大学
- Cantonese Yale: Hēunggóng Gūnghōi Daaihhohk
Transcriptions
Standard Mandarin
- Hanyu Pinyin: Xiānggǎng Gōngkāi Dàxué
Yue: Cantonese
- Yale Romanization: Hēunggóng Gūnghōi Daaihhohk
- Jyutping: Hoeng1 gong2 gung1 hoi1 daai6 hok6

Open Learning Institute of Hong Kong
- Traditional Chinese: 香港公開進修學院
- Simplified Chinese: 香港公开进修学院
- Cantonese Yale: Hēung góng gūng hōi jeun sāu hohk yún
Transcriptions
Standard Mandarin
- Hanyu Pinyin: Xiānggǎng Gōngkāi Jìnxiū Xuéyuàn
Yue: Cantonese
- Yale Romanization: Hēung góng gūng hōi jeun sāu hohk yún
- Jyutping: Hoeng1 gong2 gung1 hoi1 zoen3 sau1 hok6 jyun2

University rankings

Global – Overall
- QS World: 781–790 (2026)

Regional – Overall
- QS Asia: 393 (2026)

Hong Kong Metropolitan University (HKMU, previously known as the Open University of Hong Kong) is a public university in Ho Man Tin, Kowloon, Hong Kong. It is the only self-financing university set up by the Hong Kong government.

The university opened in 1989 as the Open Learning Institute of Hong Kong and gained university status in 1997 as the Open University of Hong Kong, focused on distance learning. It began to offer full-time programmes in 2001 and was renamed to Metropolitan University in 2021.

HKMU has five schools and more than 13,700 students on its full-time programmes. The current president is Professor Lam Kwan Sing.

== History ==
=== Early development ===
The Hong Kong government established the Open Learning Institute of Hong Kong (OLI) in May 1989 as the city's first tertiary education institution to provide distance learning. It was created to satisfy greater demand for education and re-training of working adults. Students did not need to satisfy any academic requirement, in contrast to other Hong Kong tertiary institutions at the time that had academically-rigorous entrance criteria.

The management of OLI had only four months to prepare for its first intake of 4,200 students in eight courses. The Hong Kong government provided decreasing financial support until 1993, when it required OLI to become self-financing. Because of the limited financial support and time allowed for OLI's founding, Open University in the United Kingdom provided courses, consultants and staff, and its management model was a point of reference.

OLI received more than 63,000 applications for its first cohort. The first batch of graduates left the institute in December 1993.

In June 1995, the OLI passed the accreditation by the Hong Kong Council for Accreditation of Academic Qualifications and received the recommendation of granting the self-accrediting status after June 1996. In October 1996, the Hong Kong Government granted the OLI with the self-accrediting status. It recognised the capacity of self-management and quality assurance of the Institution. In February 1997, the Hong Kong Executive Council approved in principle to the upgrade the OLI to a university. In May 1997, the motion for the third reading was agreed by the Legislative Council of Hong Kong. The OLI was upgraded to the Open University of Hong Kong and became the seventh statutory university in Hong Kong.

=== Continuous improvement ===
In October 1998, students of the OUHK were allowed to be included in the Non-means-tested Loan Scheme for Full-time Tertiary Students (NLSFT). In June 1999, the OUHK was conferred the Prize of Excellence for Institutions by the International Council for Open and Distance Education (ICDE) for 1999. In October 1999, the Hong Kong Government approved a one-off grant of HK$50 million to develop the University into a Centre of Excellence in Distance and Adult Learning and accepted the OUHK to apply for the grant of the Research Grants Council (RGC). In June 2000, the electronic library of the OUHK won the Stockholm Challenge Award in a global IT contest.

In October 2000, the Open University of Hong Kong Centre for Continuing and Community Education was officially renamed as the Li Ka Shing Institute of Professional and Continuing Education to acknowledge the donation of HK$40 million by the Li Ka Shing Foundation in supporting the establishment of the Island Learning Centre.

=== Launch of full-time programmes ===
In September 2001, the OUHK firstly launched the full-time associate degree programme. In March 2005, the University introduced the first full-time top-up degree programme. In May 2004, the OUHK partnered with the Vocational Training Council (VTC) to introduce top-up degree programmes.

In May 2005, the OUHK started to collaborate with local hospitals for nurse degree education. The University partnered with Cathay Pacific Airways to organise the Professional Diploma in Inflight Service programme. In October 2005, the University partnered with the Hong Kong Police Force for recruit police constables' foundation training.

In September 2006, the OUHK officially started to participate in the Hong Kong's centralised joint university admission system (JUPAS), becoming the first higher education institution offering self-financing degree programmes. In the meantime, the OUHK partner with the Hong Kong Baptist Hospital. In June 2007, the OUHK established Centre for Putonghua Education and Testing. In August 2007, the OUHK signed the Memorandum of Understanding with the Union Hospital, partnering to launch full-time Bachelor of Nursing with honours (General Health) programmes. In the meantime, the OUHK freely opened its teaching materials, providing Hong Kong residents with self-studying opportunities. In September 2007, the University Council unanimously approved to name the School of Business and Administration after Dr Lee Shau-kee to acknowledge his donation of HK$50 million in supporting the establishment of the University Development Fund. In December 2007, the OUHK was included in the Government's Matching Grant Scheme for the first time and raised a total of HK$160 million as a result.

In May 2008, the OUHK firstly partnered with the Clothing Industry Training Authority (CITA) on fashion business top-up degree

In June 2008, full-time nursing programmes were accredited by the Nursing Council.

=== Research centre ===
Under the co-ordination of the Research Grants Council (RGC) in 2014, the OUHK was granted a subsidy of HK$18 million in the application of research grants for local self-financing institutions to set up the Institute for Research in Innovative Technology & Sustainability, the Research Institute for Digital Culture and Humanities and the Centre of Chinese Culture.

== Programmes offered ==
=== Full-time programmes ===
Full-time programmes have been the recent main focus of the HKMU. Similar to the full-time programmes of other universities, the programmes are conducted by lectures and tutorials. Some even include laboratory courses and practicums. Face-to-face programmes mainly consists of full-time and part-time modes. Some full-time face-to-face programmes have been included in the Hong Kong's centralised joint university admission system (JUPAS).

=== Part-time programmes ===
Part-time programmes include distance learning programmes. The programmes have been ongoing at the HKMU since its establishment. The University provide students who applies for distance learning programmes with self-study materials. Some programmes even include interactive CD-ROMs, videos and computer software. The University's tutors conduct regular tutorials on weekday evenings and weekends. Distance learning programmes allow students to decide of they want to attend tutorials. However, some tutorials require students to attend specific classes or laboratory courses. Besides, the University arranges tutors to provide students with guidance and assistance by phone, email or online at specific time. Tutors also provide feedback on all assignments to help guide students' learning. Although most distance learning programmes are in open entry, with no entry requirements on finishing a qualification, students are required to complete specific assignments and to pass end-term exams during their study periods so as to attain the course credit. Besides, every distance learning programme, including diploma and degree programmes, is set with studying rules. Students are required to follow the rule to accumulate assigned course credits so as to apply for qualifications.

== Governance and Organisation ==
Hong Kong Metropolitan University Ordinance states that the Chief Executive (Hong Kong Governor before the return of Hong Kong to China) or a person designated by him shall be the Chancellor of the University.

=== Academic and Research Units ===
The academic units of the University consists of:

- School of Arts and Social Sciences
- Lee Shau Kee School of Business and Administration
- School of Education and Languages
- School of Nursing and Health Sciences
- School of Science and Technology
- School of Open Learning
- Li Ka Shing School of Professional and Continuing Education (LiPACE)

The University Office of Research Affairs is set up to serve as a centralised unit of the University overseeing research activities of the University, supporting research carried out by staff of the University and co-ordinating development projects with external funding. There are six main research institutes and they are:

- Institute for Research in Innovative Technology & Sustainability
- Institute for Research in Open and Innovative Education
- Research Institute for Bilingual Learning and Teaching (RIBiLT)
- Institute of International Business and Governance

Public and Social Policy Research Centre

- Research Institute for Digital Culture and Humanities
- OUHK Tin Ka Ping Centre of Chinese Culture

== Gallery ==
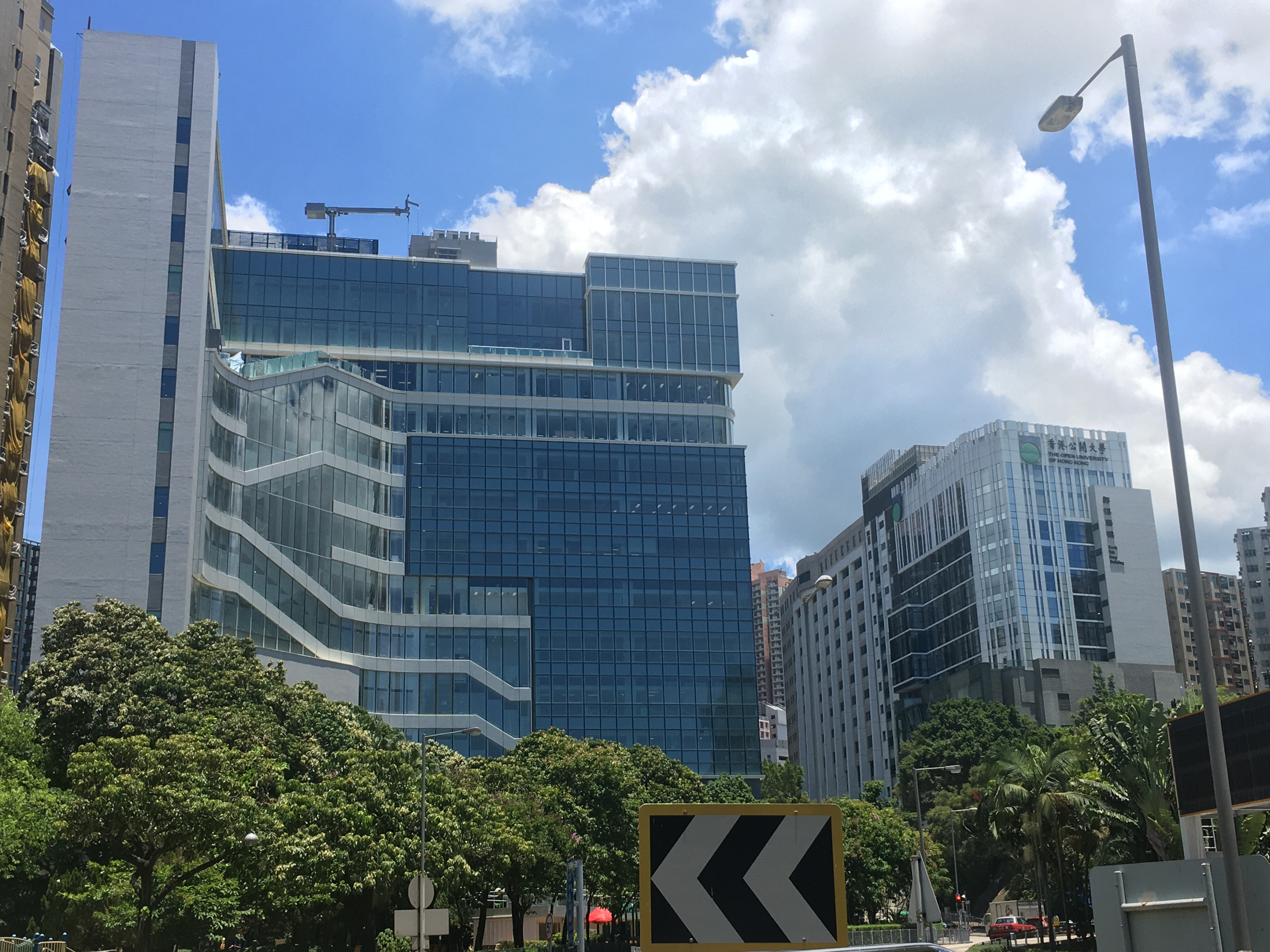
HKMU Main Campus and Jockey Club Institute of Health Care

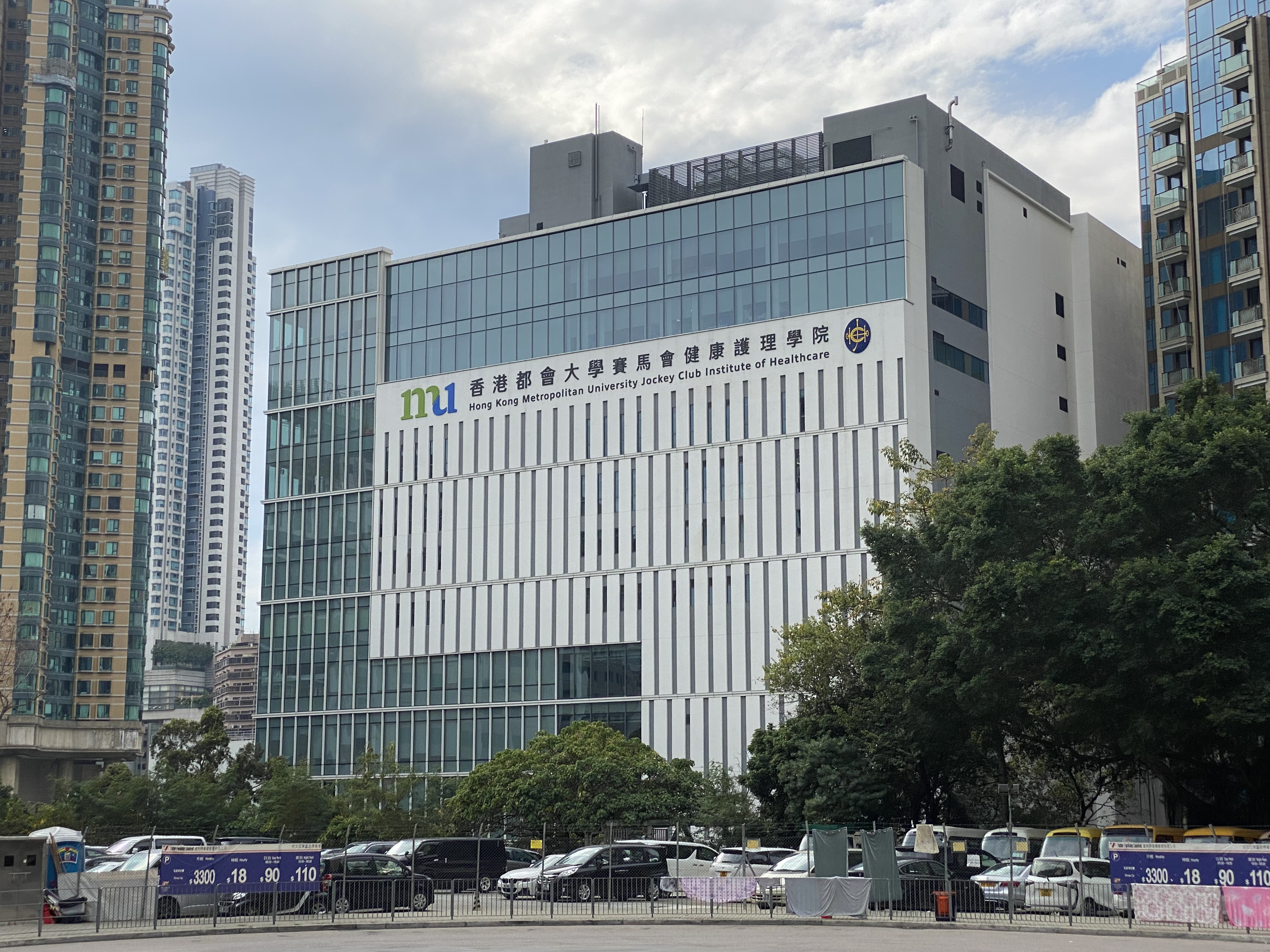
Hong Kong Metropolitan University IOH campus

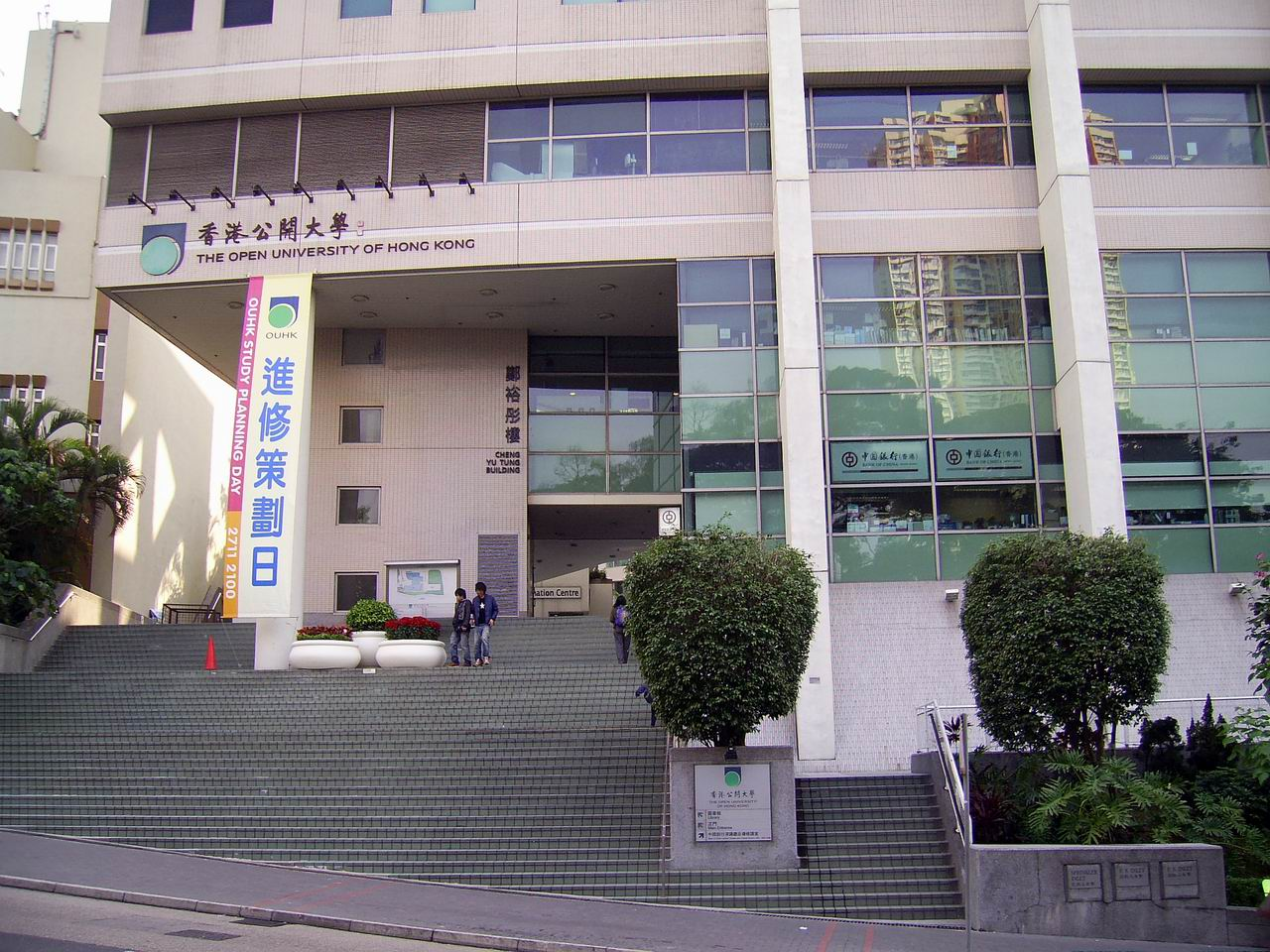
The HKMU Campus Phase I High Block (Cheng Yu Tung Building), facing Fat Kwong Street

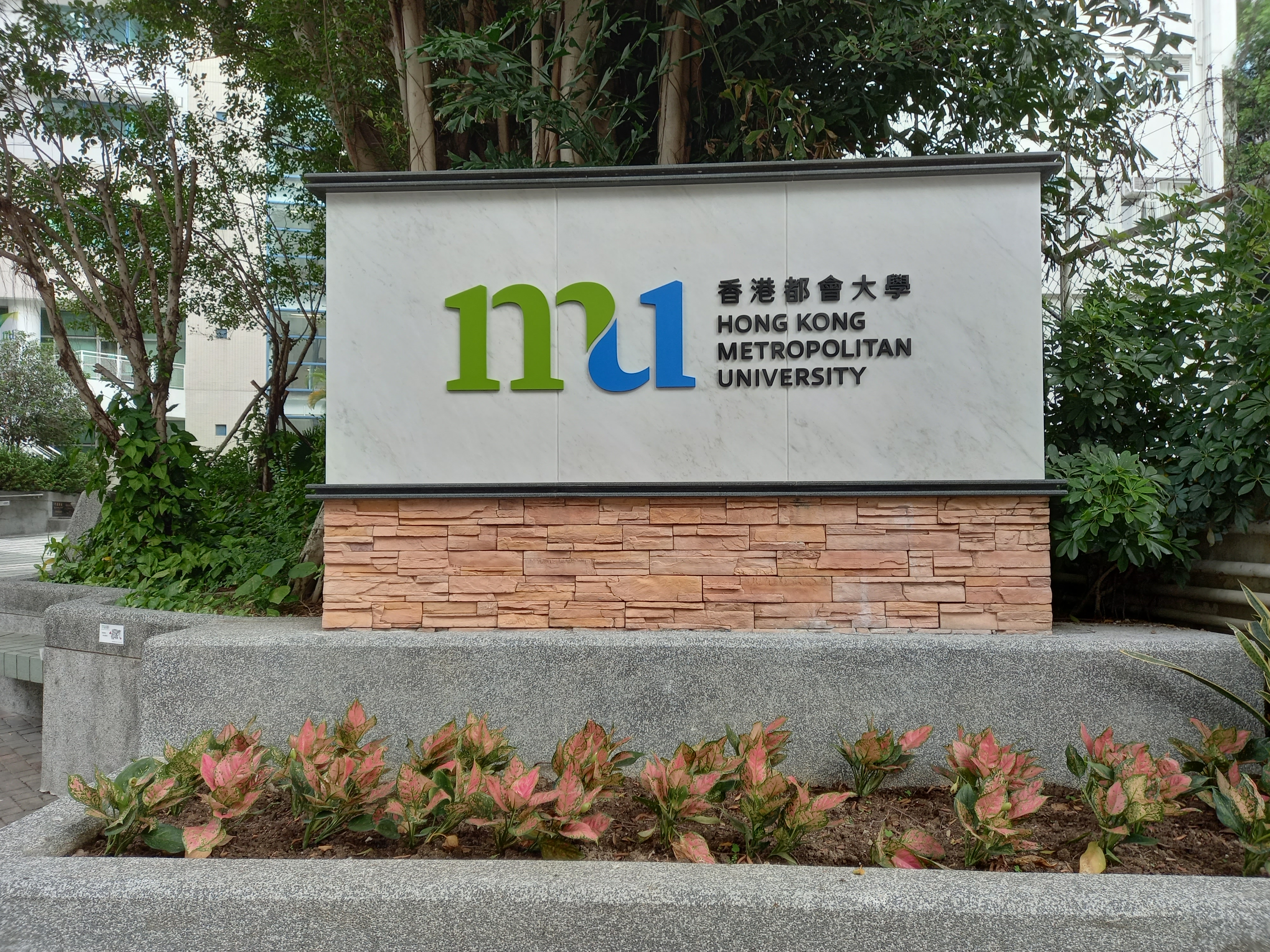
HKMU Main Campus Banner

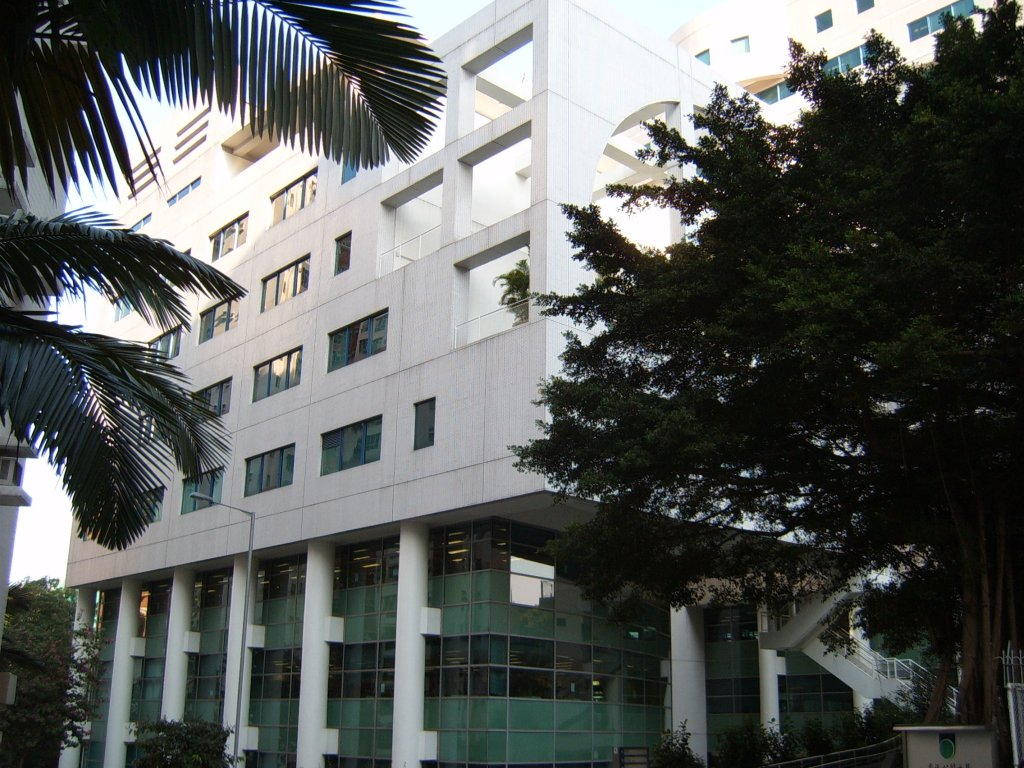
The HKMU Campus Phase I Low Block, facing Good Shepherd Street

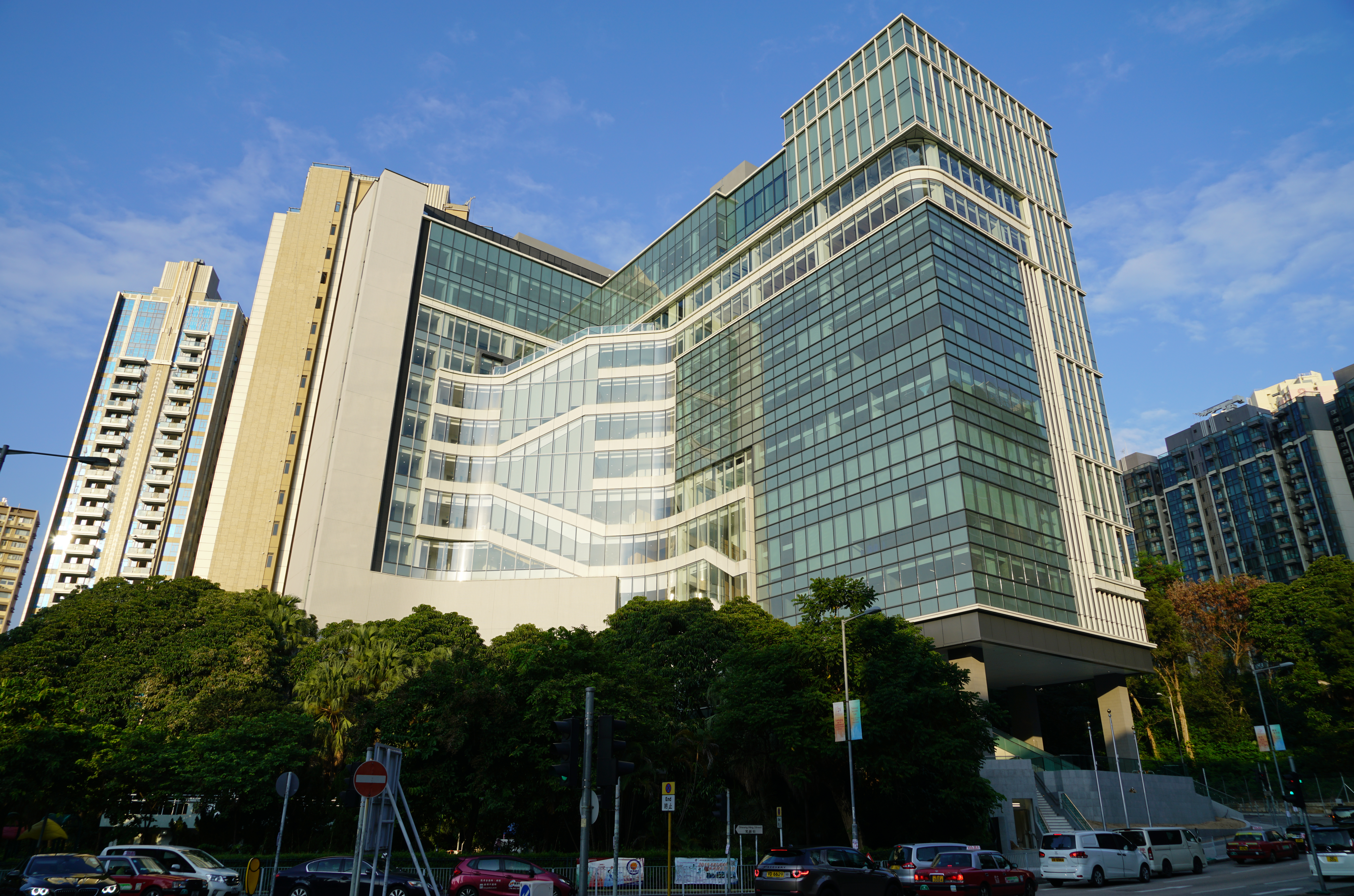
HKMU Jockey Club Institute of Health Care

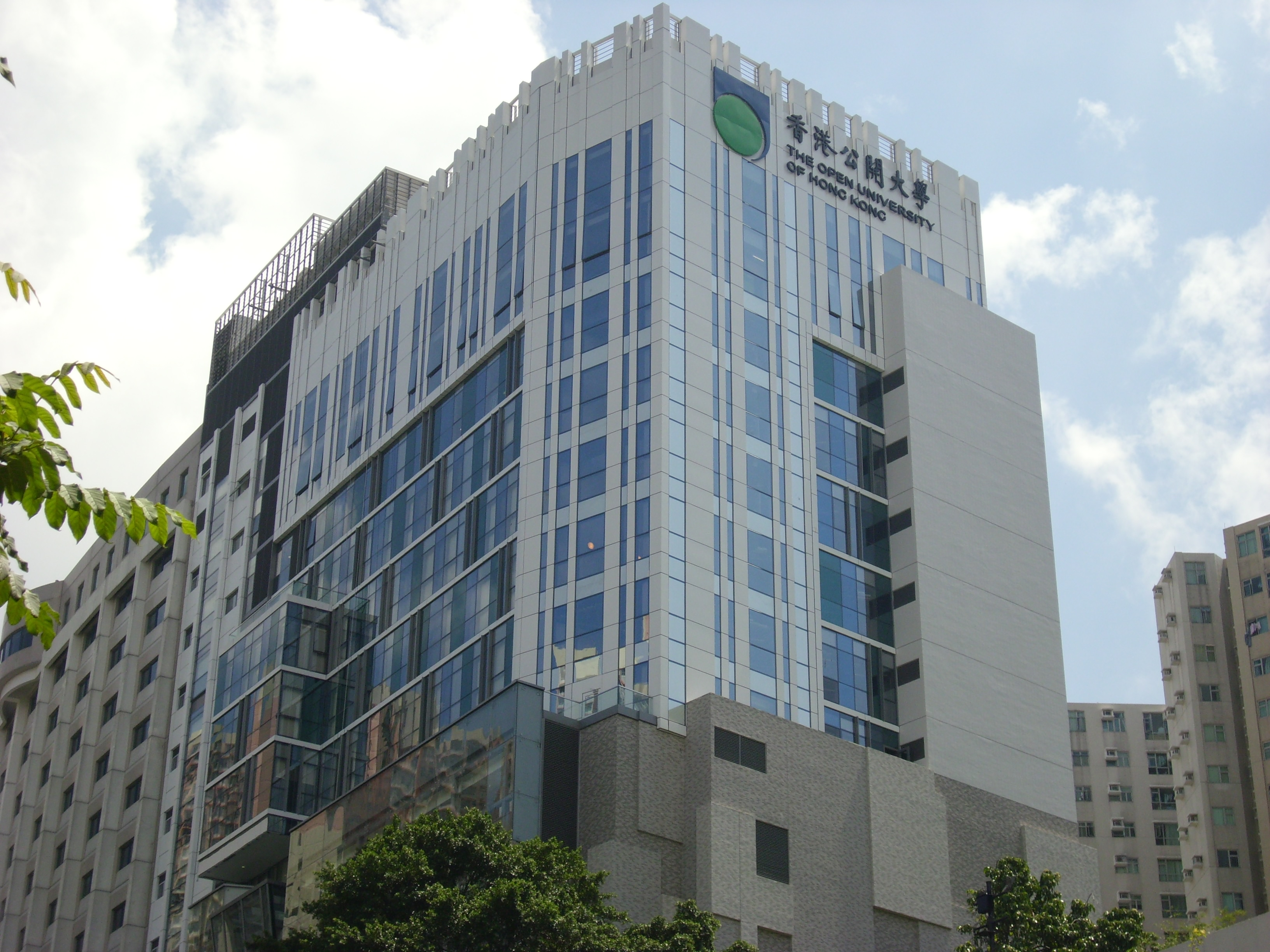
The HKMU Campus Phase II (Kwok Tak Seng Building), facing Fat Kwong Street

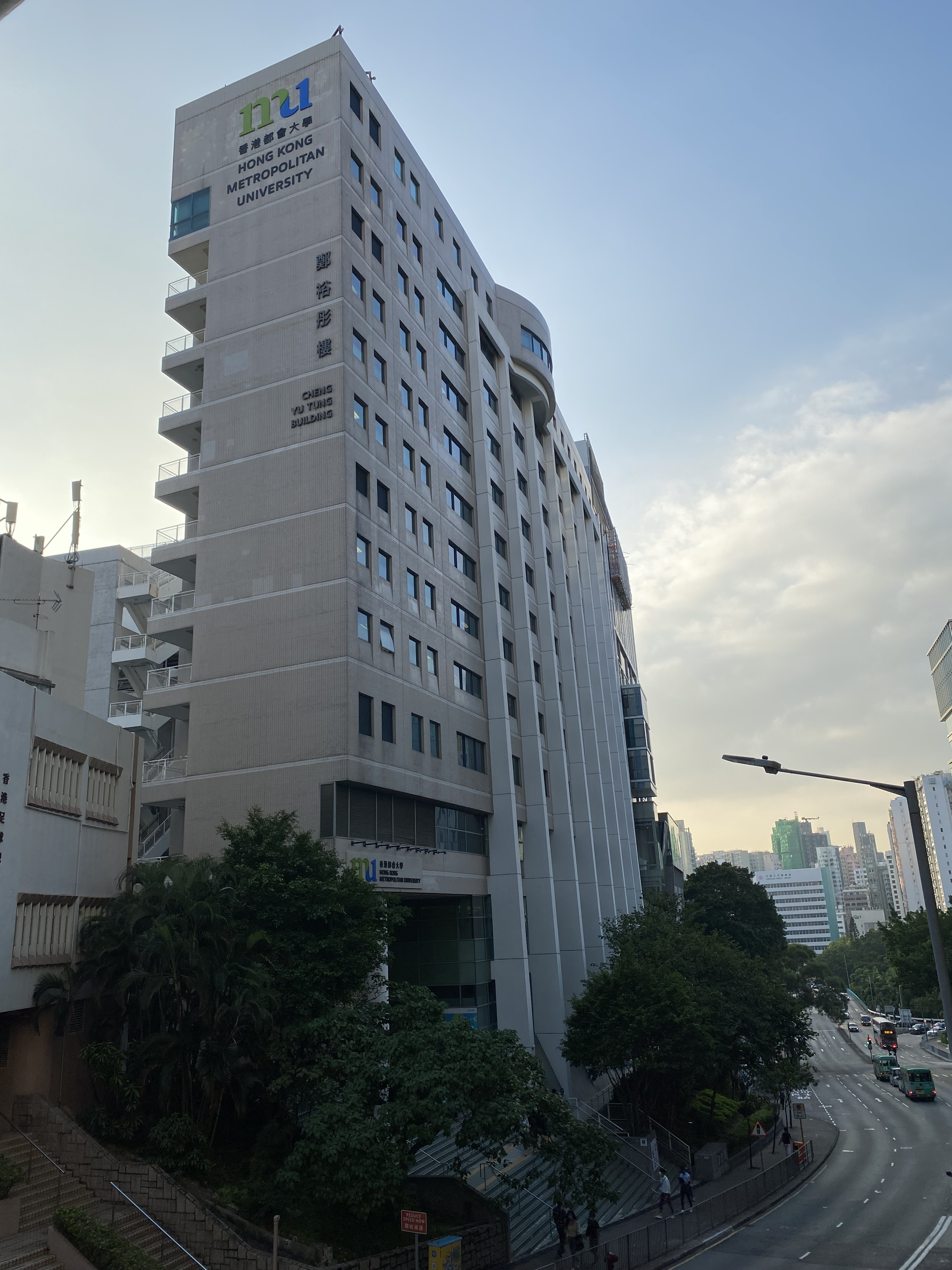
The HKMU Main Campus viewed from Fat Kwong Street

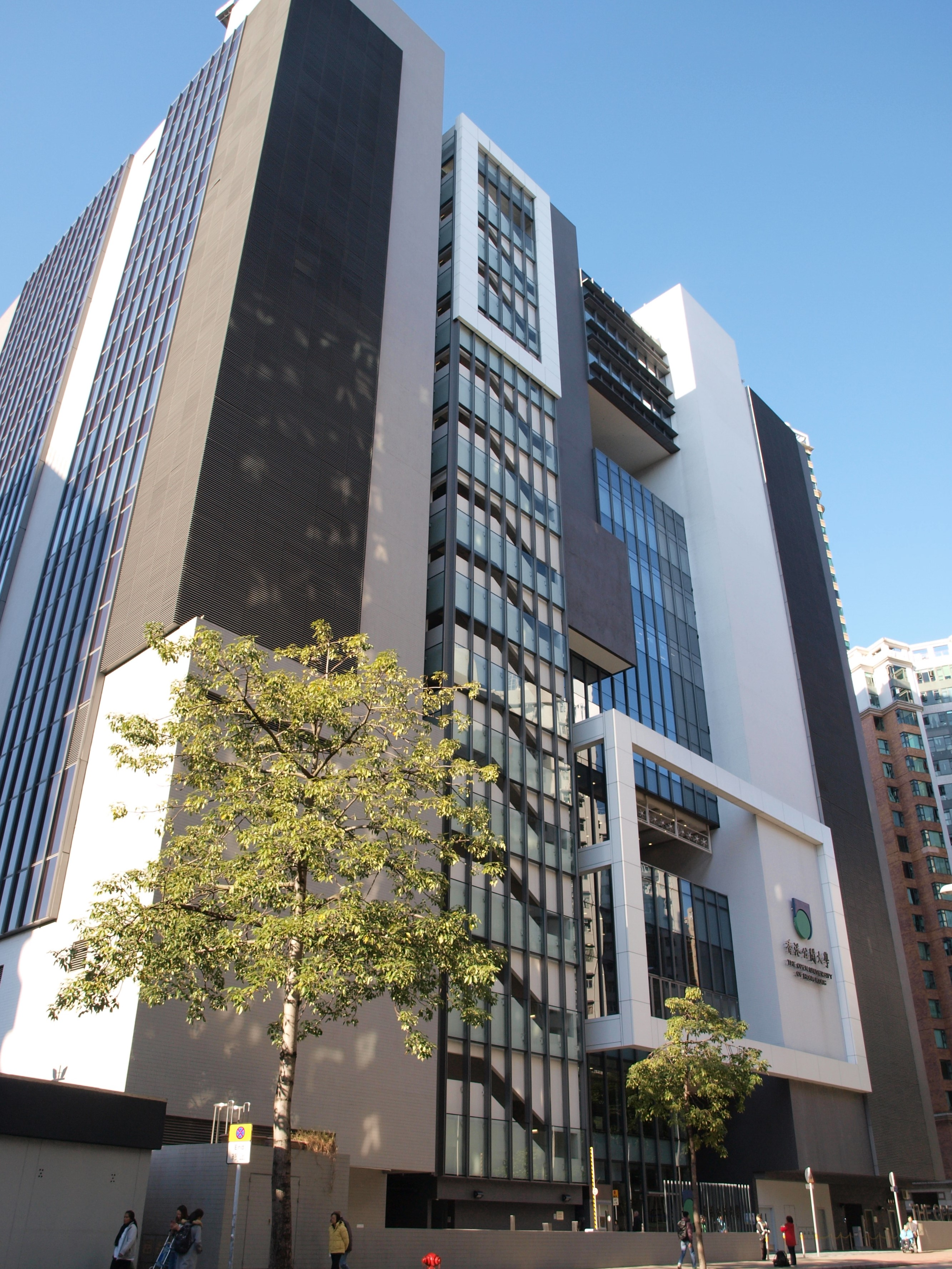
The HKMU Campus (Jubilee College at Jockey Club Campus), facing Chung Hau Street

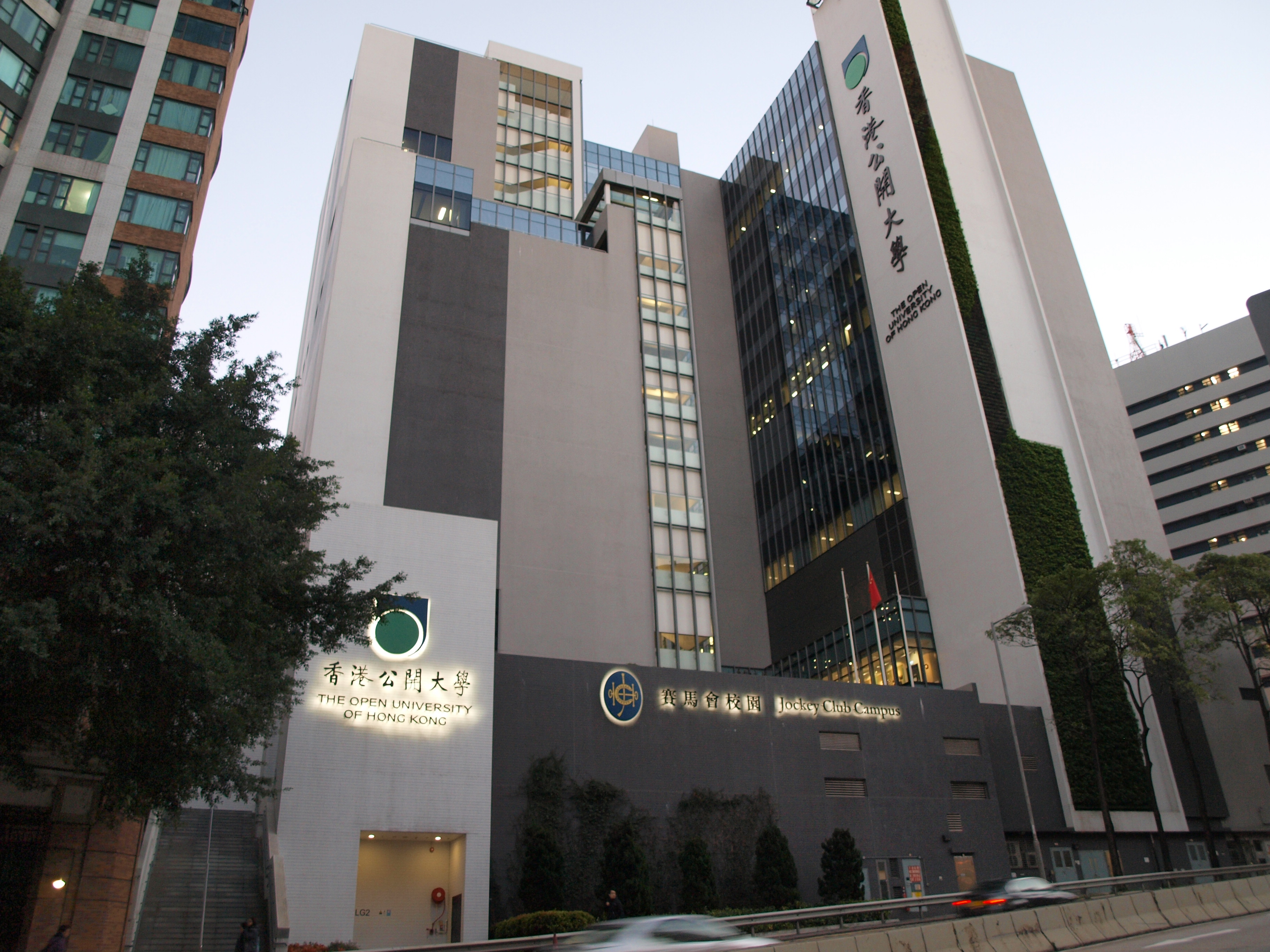
The HKMU Campus (Jubilee College at Jockey Club Campus), facing Princess Road

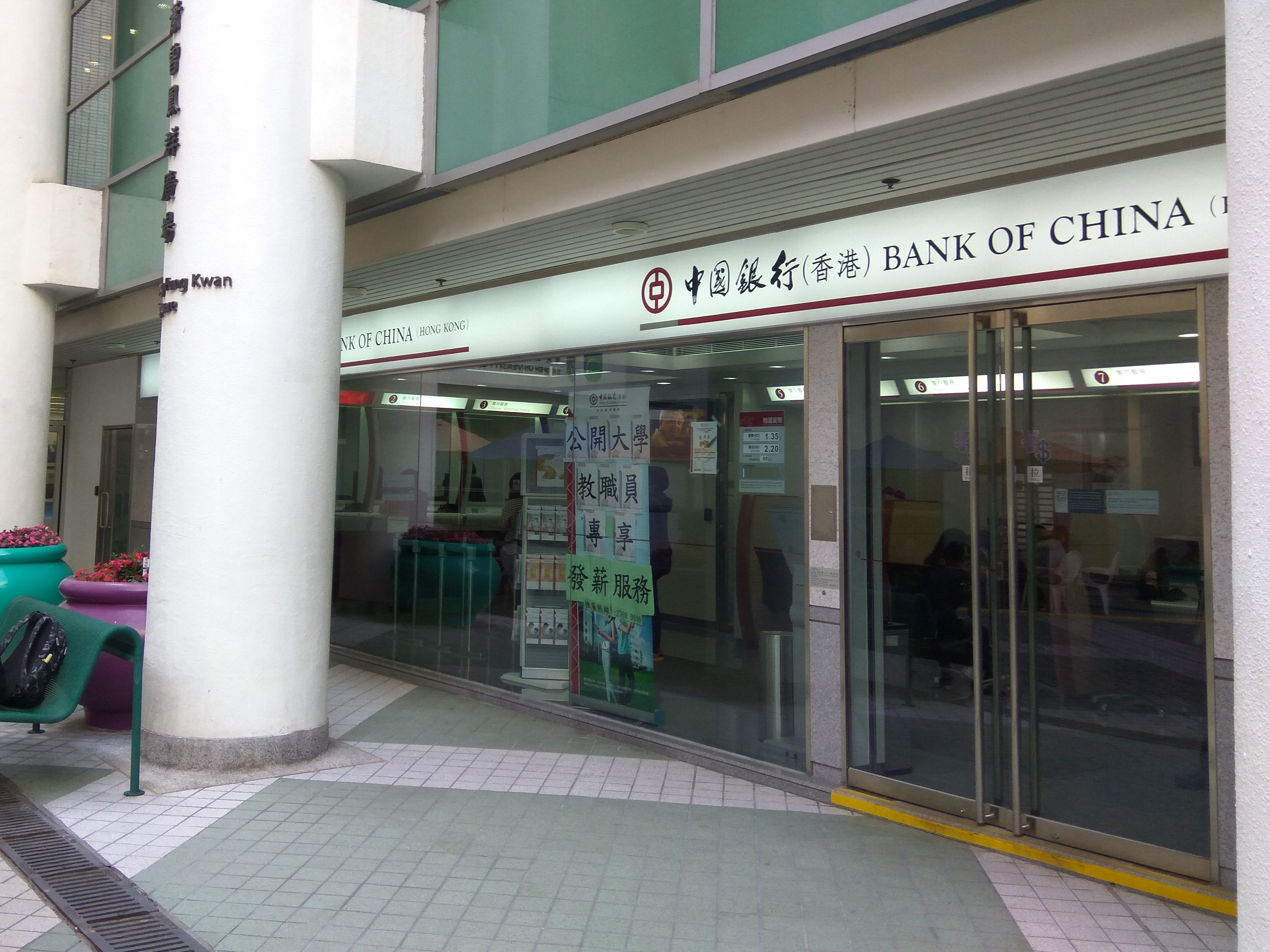
Bank of China (Hong Kong) branch in the HKMU Main Campus

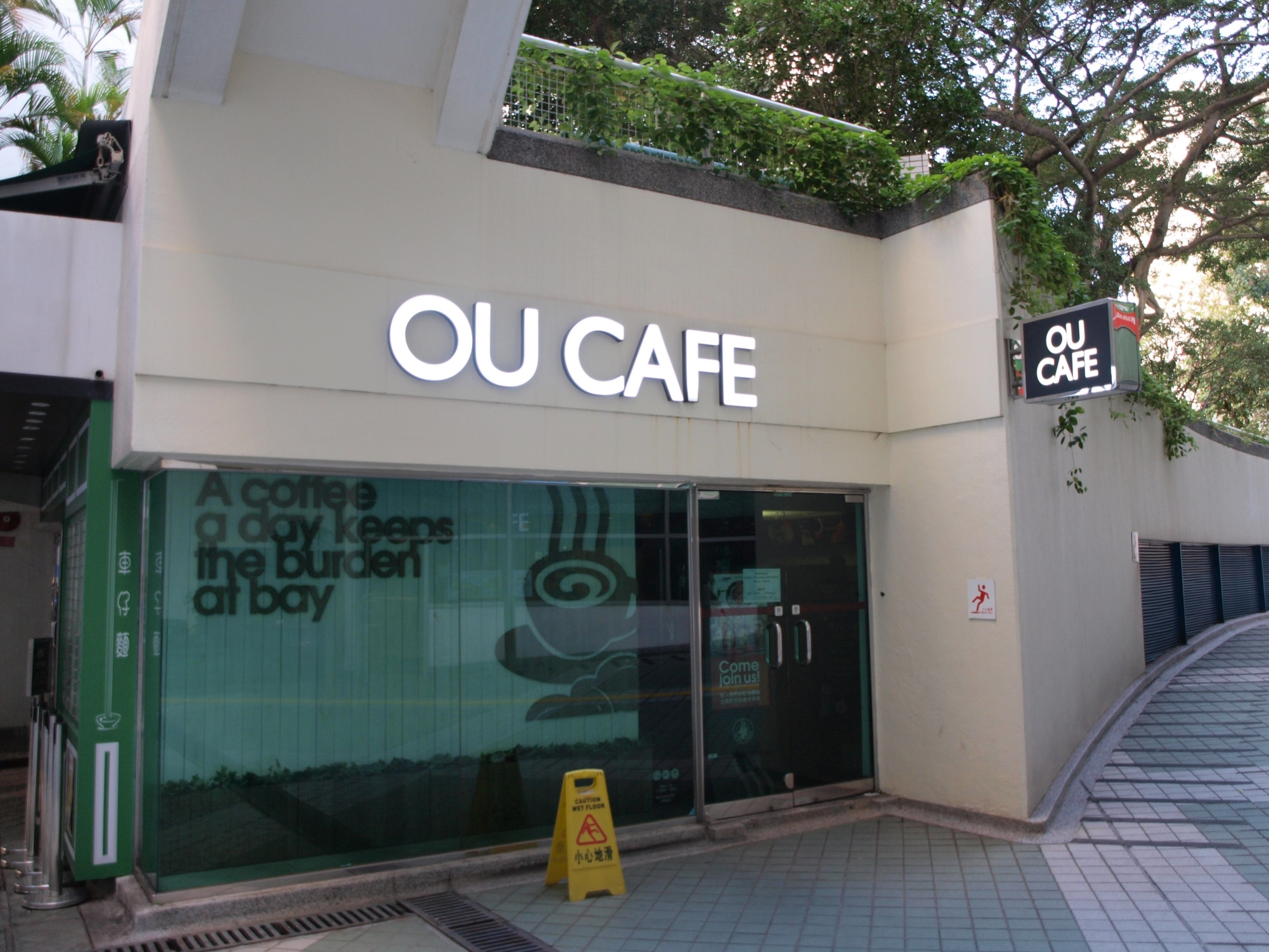
MU CAFE is being operated by Grove in the HKMU Main Campus

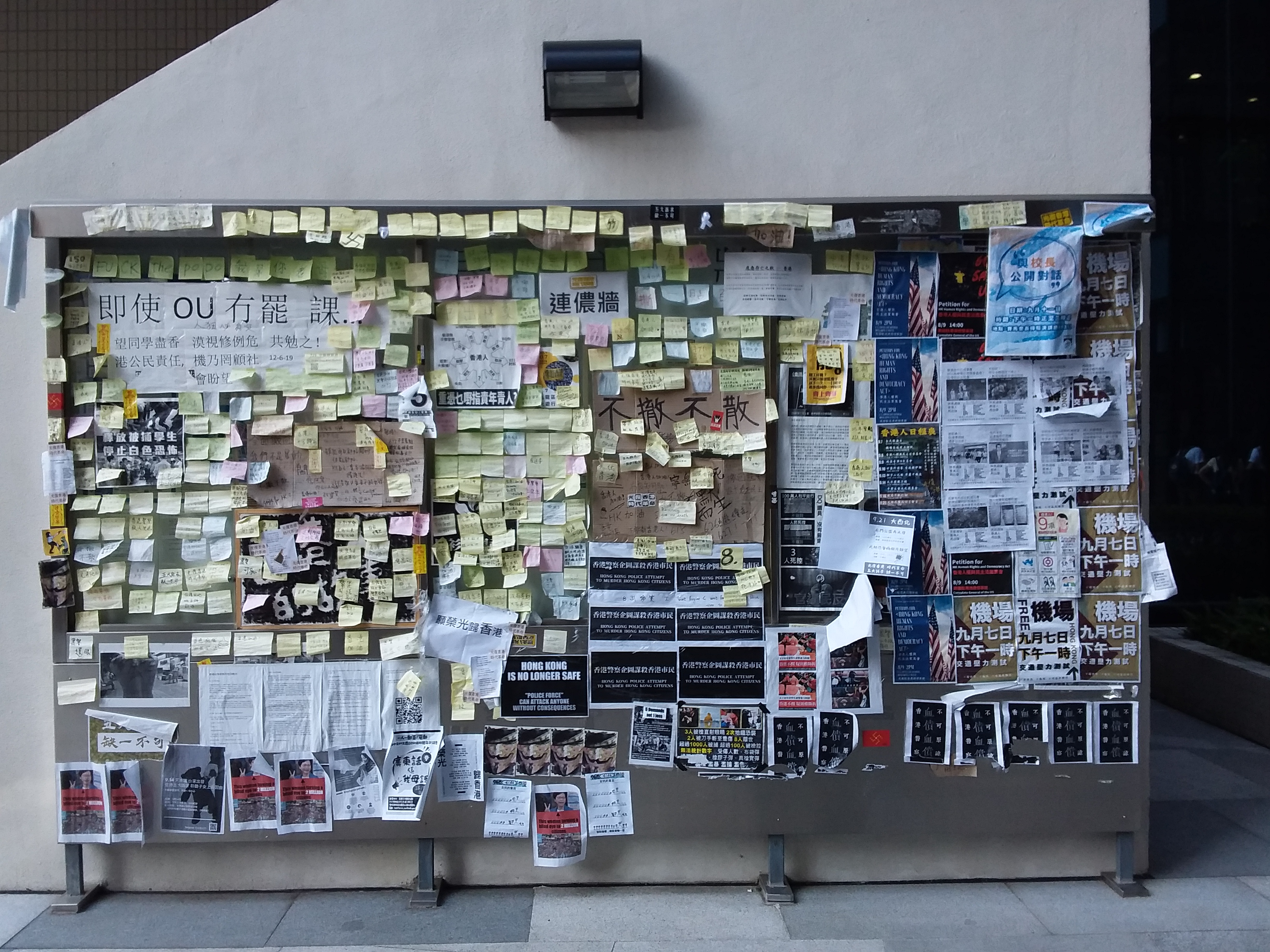
HKMU democracy wall

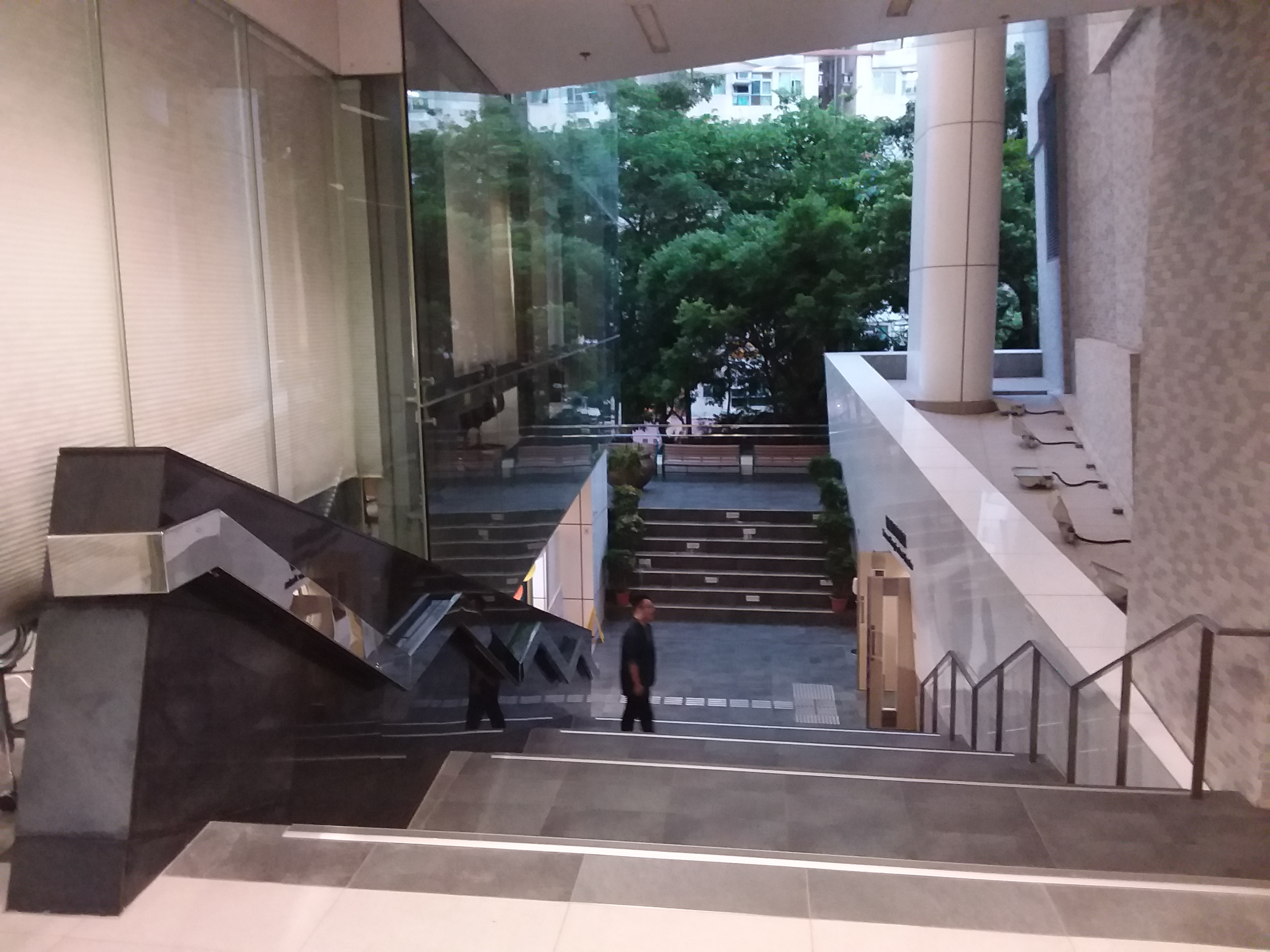
HKMU Auditorium entrance

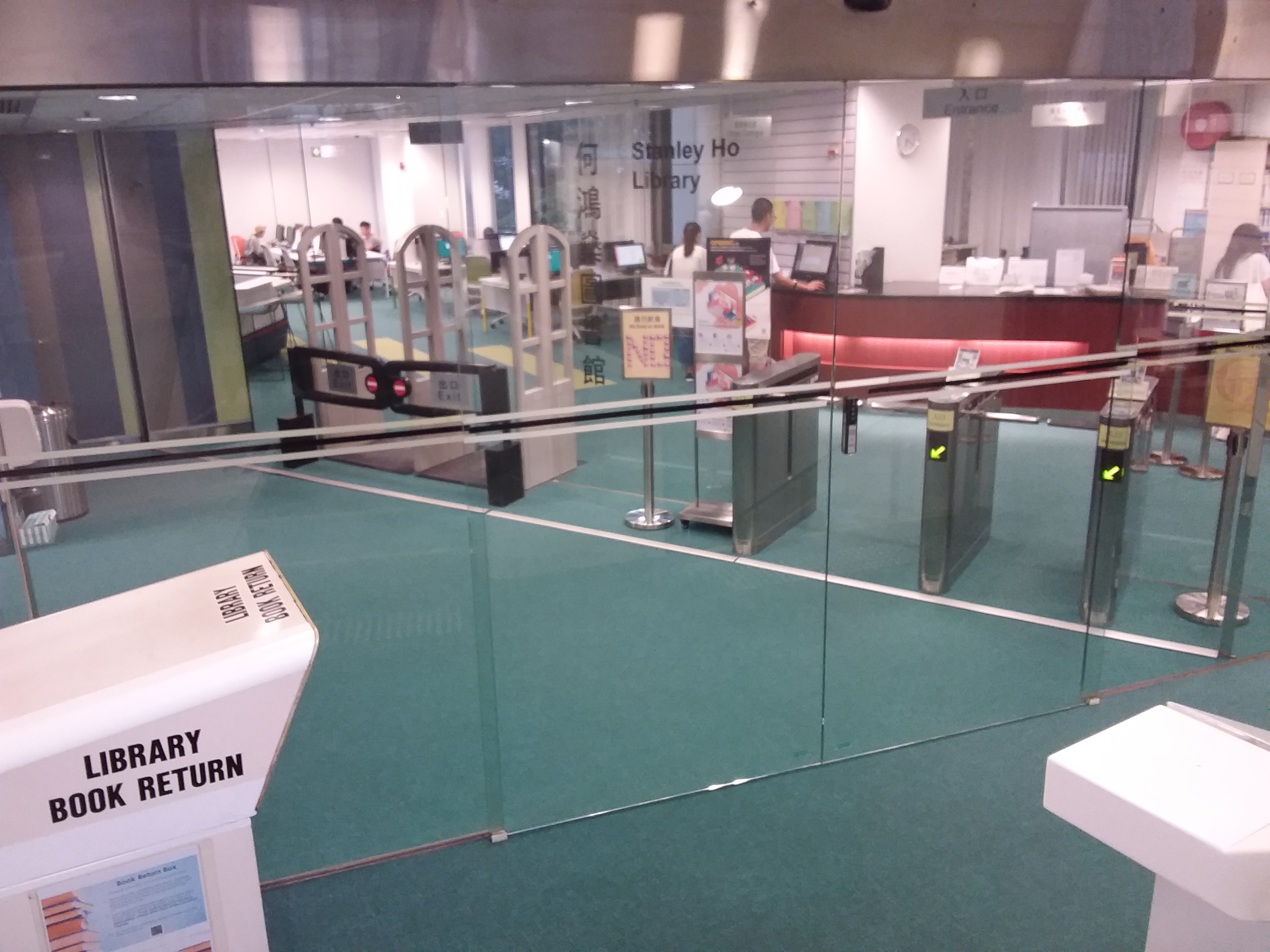
HKMU Stanley Ho Library

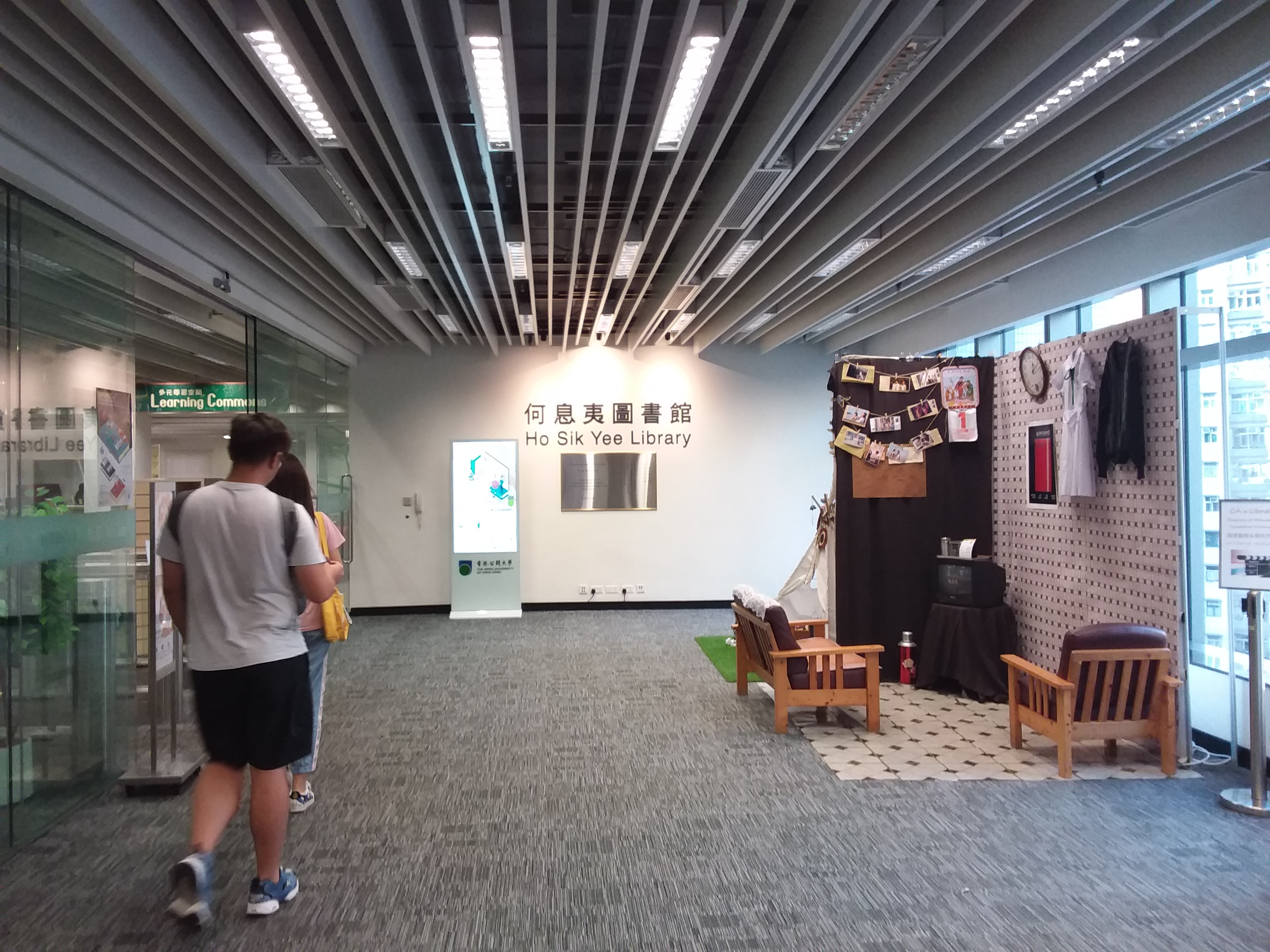
HKMU Ho Sik Yee Library

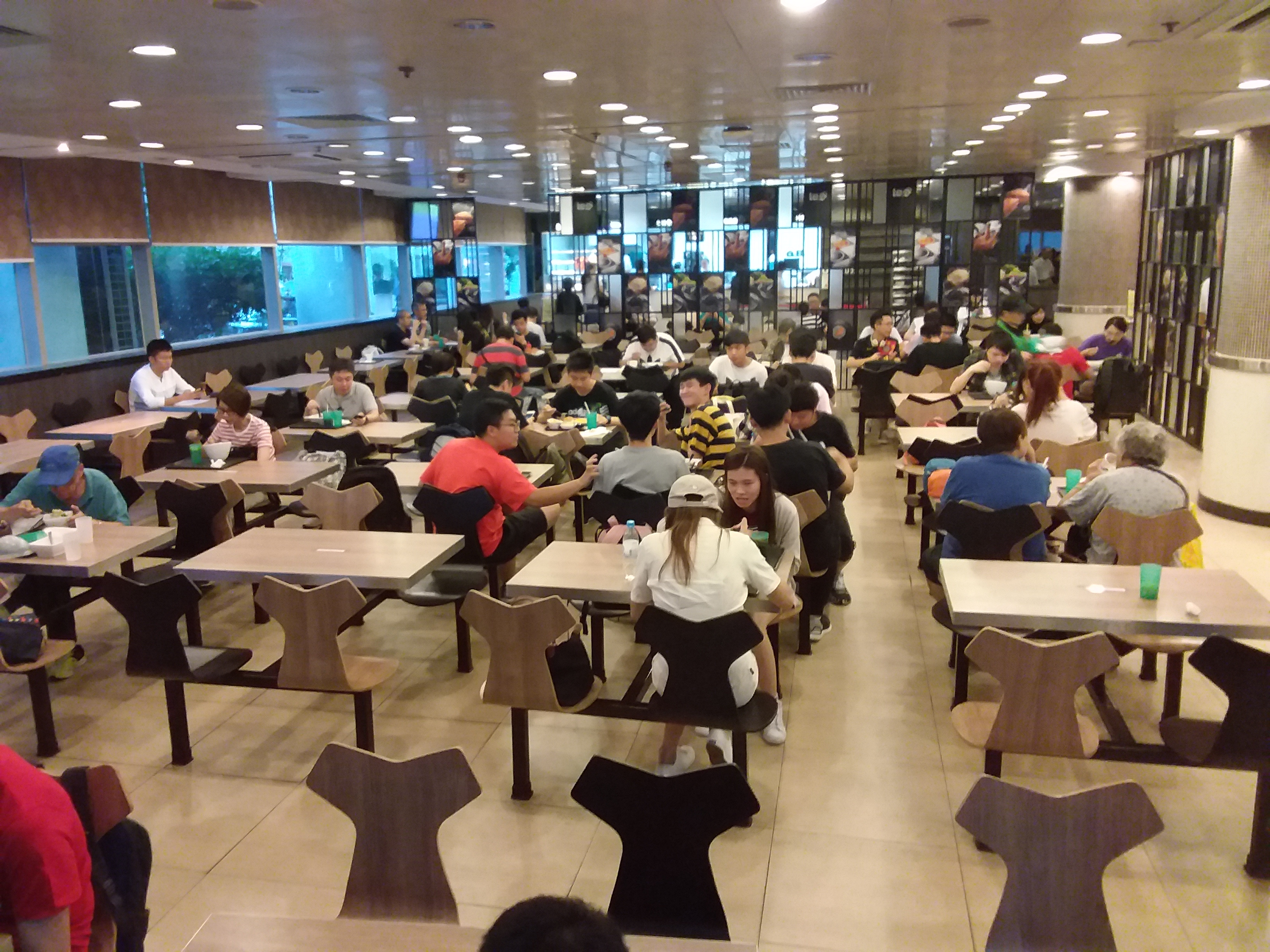
Hong Kong Metropolitan University Canteen (MU Club)

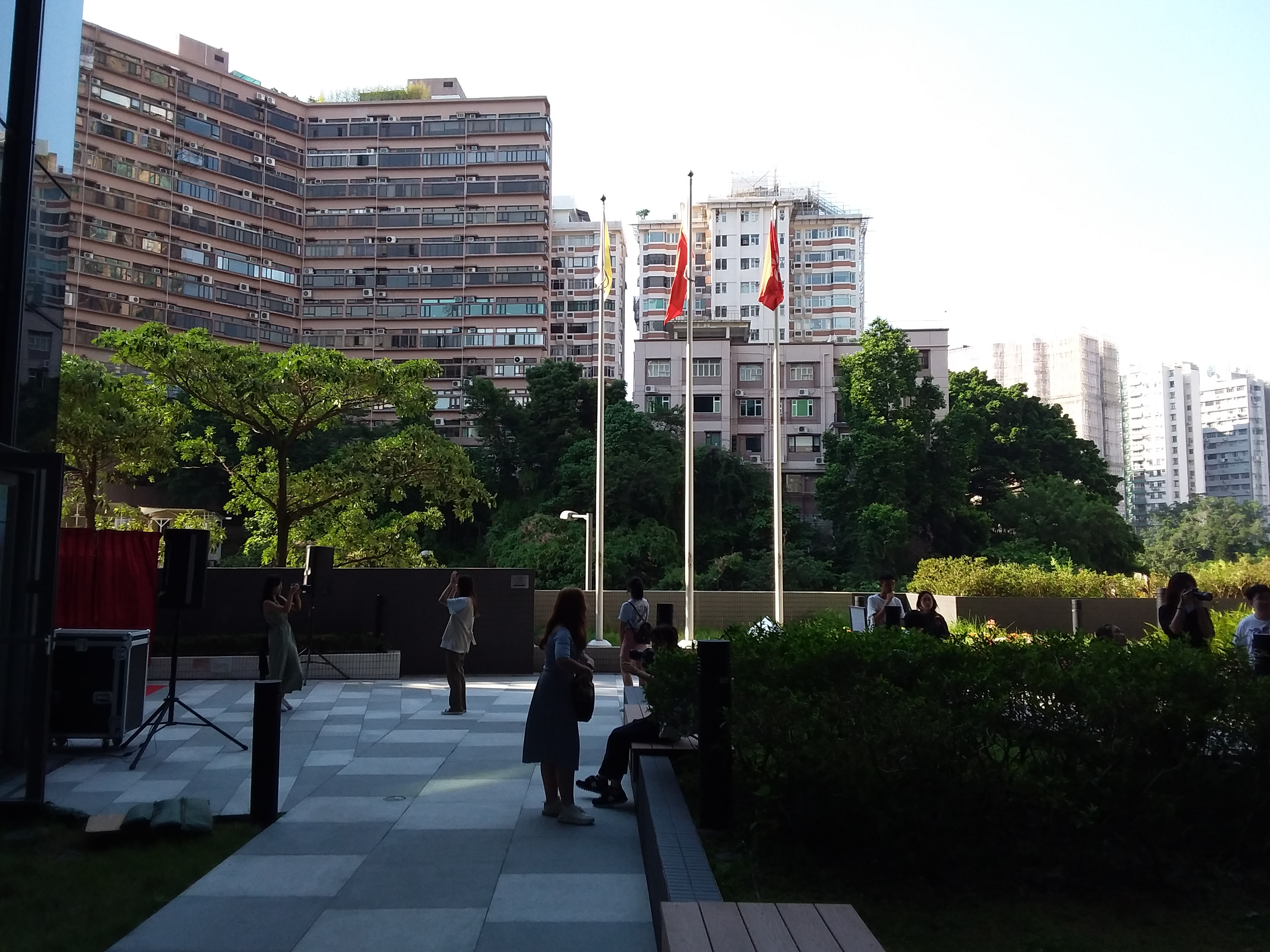
HKMU JC Campus Platform

== Campus development ==
The earliest campus of the Open University of Hong Kong was located at the Hennessy Centre at Causeway Bay. Then, it moved to the Trade and Industry Department Tower in Mong Kok. It soon moved to the Princess Road, Ho Man Tin for the preparation of the grand opening of Ho Man Tin Campus.

In April 1996, the campus located in 30 Good Shepherd Street opened and provided students with an ideal learning environment.

In July 2000, the multimedia laboratory subsidised by the Hong Kong Jockey Club opened.

In October 2000, the Island Learning Centre located in Shun Tak Centre, Sheung Wan opened. The Open University of Hong Kong Centre for Continuing and Community Education was officially renamed as the Li Ka Shing Institute of Professional and Continuing Education to acknowledge the donation of $40 million by the Li Ka Shing Foundation in supporting the establishment of the Island Learning Centre.

In April 2005, the OUHK rented the entire 1/F of the Ho Man Tin Plaza as its learning centre.

In May 2005, the Campus Phase II Development started. The Project was to build an academic building of 12 floors at the carpark of Ho Man Tin Main Campus located at Good Shepherd Street. The expense of the Development was about $170 million. It received various donations from the public, including the TS Kwok Foundation, the Tin Ka Ping Foundation, Wong Bing-lai, Serena Yang Hsueh-chi, Stanley Ho Hung-sun, the Chiang Chen Industrial Charity Foundation, Cheng Yu-tung, Solomon Lee Kui-nang and others. The Campus Phase II Development Project received the Government interest-free loan of $120 million. The OUHK officially named the new academic building after Dr Kwok Tak Seng Building to acknowledge the TS Kwok Foundation granting a donation of $40 million to support the Campus Phase II Development Project. In August 2008, the Campus Phase II Building Ground-breaking Ceremony was held. On 22 January 2008, the OUHK named the high block of the Ho Man Tin main campus building after Cheng Yu-tung, in recognition of his donation of HK$35 million towards the development of the University's phase II campus extension.

In May 2008, the Clinical Nursing Education Centre opened. It is the simulation centre incorporating the learning elements of general, mental and Chinese medicinal nursing.

In September 2008, the Campus Phase II opened.

In September 2010, the OUHK named the courtyard of the Ho Man Tin Main Campus after Siu Tsang Fung Kwan, in recognition of the donation of 10 million by Mr Gerald C S Siu and the support from his mother Siu Tsang Fung Kwan and his wife.

In December 2012, the OUHK received the grant of land on Chung Hau Street, Ho Man Tin from the Education Bureau and made use of it to develop the Campus Phase III and a new academic institute. The expected expense was about $720 million. In January 2011, the Campus Phase III received the Government interest-free loan of $317 million. In February 2012, the OUHK named the new campus and the auditorium after the Jockey Club, in recognition of its donation of $190 million in supporting the development of the Campus Phase III. On 28 February 2012, the ground-breaking ceremony of the Campus Phase III was held.

In August 2012, the OUHK sold the Island Learning Centre located at Shun Tak Centre, Sheung Wan and purchased a new learning centre in Kwai Hing. In September 2013, the Kwai Hing Learning Centre opened. The Li Ka Shing Institute of Professional and Continuing Education (LiPACE) moved to the Kwai Hing Learning Centre at the Block 2 of the Kowloon Commerce Centre.

In February 2014, the Jubilee College at Jockey Club Campus of the OUHK officially opened.

In August 2014, the OUHK received the approval from the Town Planning Board, rezoning the vacant land of 11 years on Sheung Shing Street for the government and public purposes to facilitate the development of a new academic building。The Planning Department considered that the development would not bring any negative impacts to neighbouring areas. In the meantime, the Education Bureau also gave support to the extension project of the OUHK. Therefore, the application was finally approved.

In February 2017, the OUHK is going to build a Nursing and Healthcare Complex opposite to the Ho Man Tin Main Campus on Sheung Shing Street. The establishment of the new Complex will enable the University to cater to the future manpower requirements for nursing and other healthcare services, and will allow swift response to the new and unforeseen community needs that may arise as our society ages.

In 2024, HKMU has expanded its accommodation facilities to support its growing student population. The University finalized the purchase of a hotel in Hung Hom, formerly known as Urbanwood Hotel, and renamed it MU88. Strategically located near the KMU campus and the Ho Man Tin MTR station, MU88 features 255 rooms that can house approximately 400 residents. MU88 primarily caters to non-local students, with some rooms designated for exchange students and visiting scholars. This initiative reflects HKMU's dedication to ensuring a comfortable and supportive living environment for its diverse student body.

== Campus locations ==
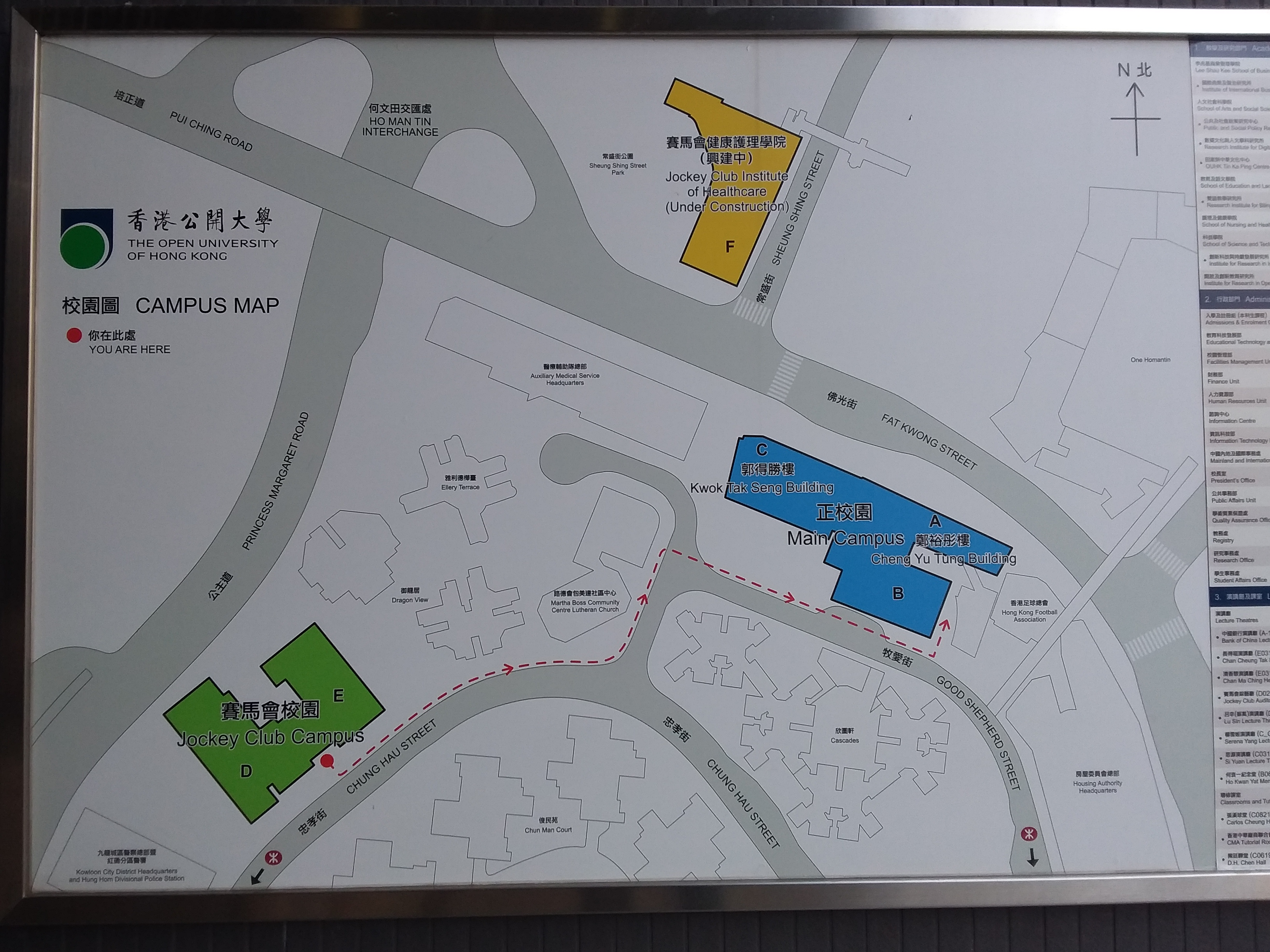
HKMU Campus Map

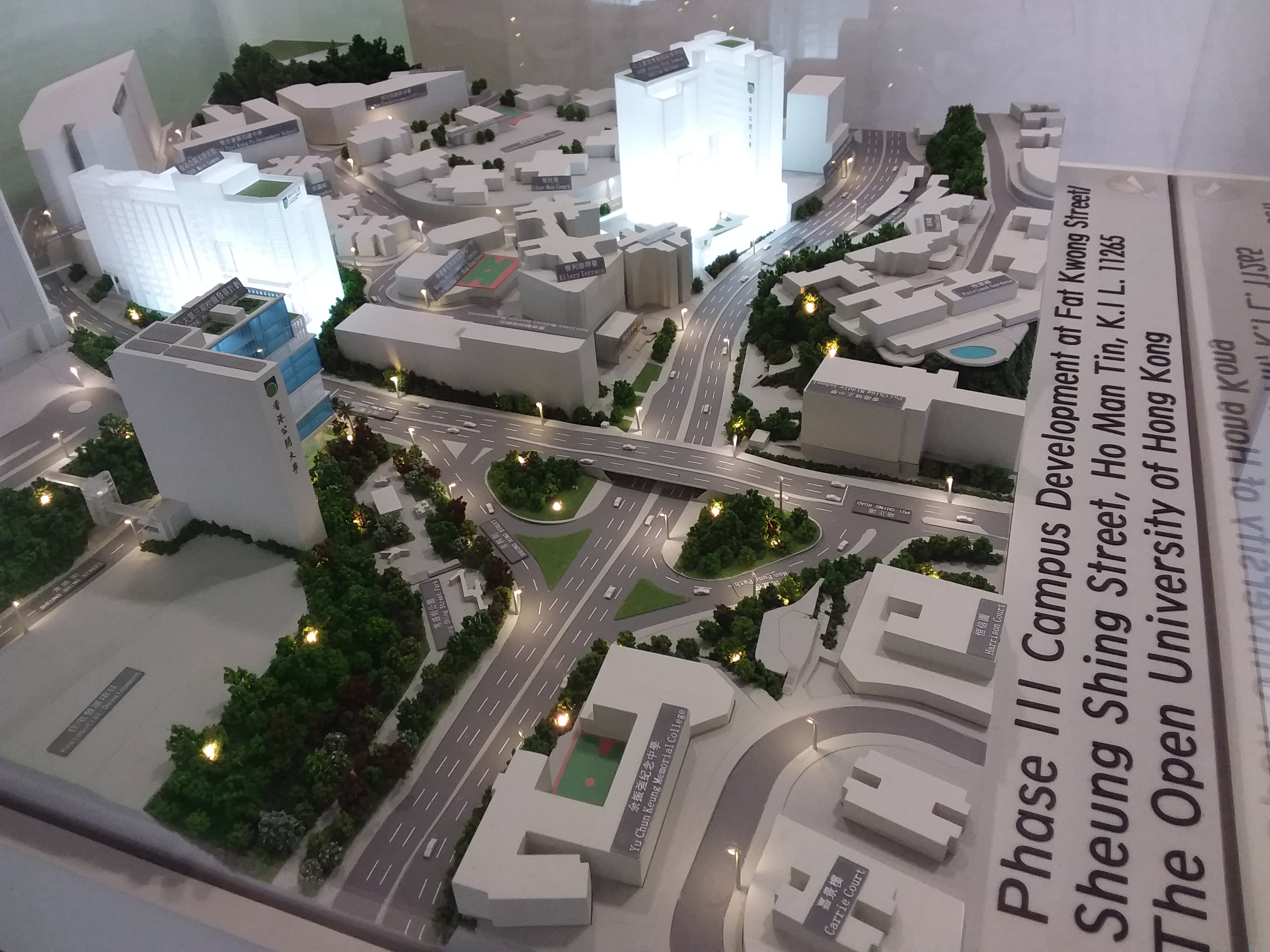
HKMU Campus building models

=== Ho Man Tin Campus ===
The Ho Man Tin Campus consists of the Main Campus on Good Shepherd Street and the Jockey Club Campus.

The Main Campus is located at 30 Good Shepherd Street, adjacent to SKH Tsoi Kung Po Secondary School, the Hong Kong Football Association Limited and the Auxiliary Medical Service Headquarters. It consists of Block A, B and C.

- Block A: The HKMU Campus Phase I High Block (Cheng Yu Tung Building), facing Fat Kwong Street
- Block B: The HKMU Campus Phase I Low Block, facing Good Shepherd Street
- Block C: The HKMU Campus Phase II (Kwok Tak Seng Building), facing Fat Kwong Street

The Main Campus is equipped with a library, lecture halls, tutorial rooms, self-study rooms, lobbies, a canteen, a café, a bank, an information centre, a mail room, pantries, a multi-function hall, changing rooms, language laboratories, multimedia laboratories, technology laboratories, environmental laboratories, clinical nursing laboratories, a sound recording studio, music rooms, band rooms, counselling rooms and a car park. Auxiliary facilities for people with disabilities are also available.

The Jockey Club Campus located at 81 Chung Hau Street, Ho Man Tin, adjacent to Dragon View and Hung Hom Division of the Hong Kong Police Force. The Jubilee College is of 12 floors and it consists of Block D and E. It takes a few minutes to walk from the Main Campus to the Jockey Club Campus.

- Block D: The HKMU Jubilee College (facing Princess Road and Chung Hau Street)
- Block E: The HKMU Jubilee College (facing Princess Road and Chung Hau Street)

Apart from the auditorium, classrooms, the library and PC laboratories, the College is equipped with learning commons, multi-function halls, cultural and creative studio, laboratories, testing and certification laboratories, microbiological laboratories and the clinical nursing centre.

HKMU Jockey Club Institute of Health Care (IOH) – Sheung Shing Street, Ho Man Tin

- Block F: Jockey Club Institute of Health Care (IOH) (opposite to the HKMU Main Campus)

The establishment of the new campus will enable the University to cater to the future manpower requirements for nursing and other healthcare services and will allow swift response to the new and unforeseen community needs that may arise as our society ages. Meanwhile, new programmes such as Bachelor of Social Sciences with Honours in Mental Health and Psychology and Bachelor of Science with Honours in Nutrition and Dietetics are under planning to meet the growing demands for a wide array of healthcare professionals. Some brand-new facilities, including the psychology laboratory and the Special Educational Needs (SEN) service/training centre, will be built in the new Complex. They will become future assessment or resource centres for the public who have needs for specialised healthcare services.

=== Kwai Hing Campus (KHC) ===
In August 2012, the HKMU purchased floors 8 – 12 of the Block 2 of the Kowloon Commerce Centre with $770 million. Each floor is about 25,000 sq. ft. The gross area is about 124,300 sq. ft.

The Kwai Hing Campus (KHC) is located at 8–11/F, Tower 2, Kowloon Commerce Centre, 51–53 Kwai Cheong Road, Kwai Chung, New Territories. The Kwai Hing Campus opened in September 2013 and the Li Ka Shing School of Professional and Continuing Education (LiPACE) also moved from the Island Learning Centre to the Kwai Hing Campus (KHC). After from classrooms, lecture theatre, PC laboratories, study rooms, student commons and a learning resources centre, the Campus is also equipped with Jockey Club STEAM Education Laboratory, Japanese Language & Cultural Studies Centre and mock up rooms, including cabin, smart hotel room, wards, Kindergarten room and CIS room.

=== CITA Learning Centre (OCC) ===
The HKMU-CITA Learning Centre (OCC) opened in 2010, locating at 0/F – 5/F, HKMU-CITA Learning Centre (CITA Building), 201–203 Lai King Hill Road, Kwai Chung, New Territories. The area of the Centre is around 3,530 square metres with 11 classrooms, 3 PC laboratories, a learning resource centre, studios, self-study rooms and student amenities.

=== HKMU Consultants (Shenzhen) Limited ===
The company is located in Shenzhen, Guangdong, mainland China. It is responsible for managing programmes of the OUHK held in China and handling the admission applications of mainland students.

== Educational TV Programmes ==
With a mission to provide open and distance education, the OUHK has been purchasing airtime to broadcast television programmes for the benefit of the learning public since 1989. The programmes feature a wide spectrum of topics including arts, science, social sciences, business administration, education, information technology, child development and psychology as well as Chinese history and culture. They are either produced by the OUHK or purchased from the Open University of the UK or the Central Radio and TV University in China.

In October 2015, the OUHK and Television Broadcasts Limited (TVB) once again made a joint effort to launch Open for Learning, the educational TV programme airing on TVB Pearl from 9 am to 1 pm every Sunday morning. The programme has been continuously brought to the public, enlightening not only students, but everyone in Hong Kong.
