= 1957 Hong Kong municipal election =

← 1956	8 March 1957	1959 →

4 (of the 8) elected seats to the Urban Council
- Registered: 19,305 ▲31.49%
- Turnout: 6,916 (35.82%) ▼5.32pp
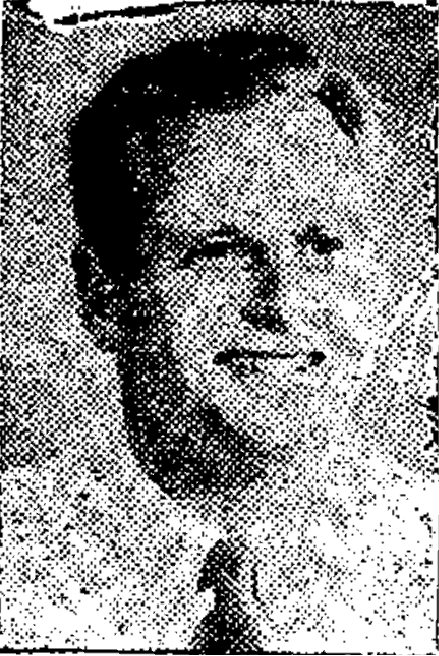

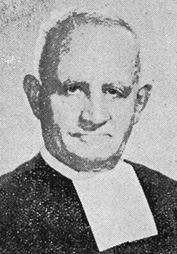
	First party	Second party
Leader	Brook Bernacchi	Brigant Cassian
Party	Reform	Civic
Seats before	6	2
Seats after	5	3
Seat change	▼1	▲1
Popular vote	11,716	15,219
Percentage	43.50%	56.50%
Swing	▼13.47pp	▲13.47pp

The 1957 Hong Kong Urban Council election was held on 8 March 1957 for the four of the eight elected seats of the Urban Council of Hong Kong. Since this election the term of the members was extended from two years to four years.

6,916 of the 19,305 eligible voters cast their ballots. Two incumbents of the Hong Kong Civic Association, Li Yiu-bor and Woo Pak-foo who won their seats last year retained their seats, while Hilton Cheong-Leen gained a seat for the Civic Association by defeating incumbent Woo Pak-chuen, Woo Pak-foo's brother, of the Reform Club of Hong Kong and took the last seat.

== Results ==
Urban Council Election 1957
Party	Candidate	Votes	%	±%
Civic	Li Yiu-bor	4,569	16.96	+7.36
Reform	Brook Bernacchi	3,923	14.56	−29.71
Civic	Woo Pak-foo	3,755	13.94	+5.38
Civic	Hilton Cheong-Leen	3,625	13.46	+6.56
Reform	Woo Pak-chuen	3,334	12.38	−32.97
Civic	K. B. Allport	3,270	12.14	
Reform	David See-chai Lam	2,365	8.78	
Reform	Lee Sheung-ngai	2,094	7.77	
Turnout		6,916	35.82	−5.32
Registered electors		19,305		+31.49

== By-election ==
An extraordinary Urban Council Election took place on 12 June 1957 due to Brook Bernacchi resigned with the allegations of over-expenditure on election. Bernacchi stood as a candidate again, facing the challenge from Civic Association's K. B. Allport who was unelected in March. Bernacchi defeated Allport with 2,590 to 1,486 votes.
