= 1963 Hong Kong municipal election =

← 1961	7 March 1963	1965 →

4 (of the 8) elected seats to the Urban Council
- Registered: 25,932 ▲9.55%
- Turnout: 5,320 (20.52%)
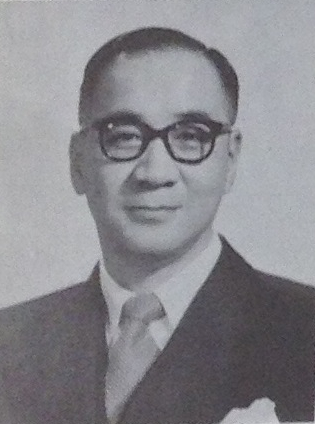
	First party	Second party
Leader	Woo Pak-foo	Brook Bernacchi
Party	Civic	Reform
Seats before	4	3
Seats after	4	3
Seat change	Steady	Steady
Popular vote	2,565	5,177
Percentage	19.53%	39.43%
Swing	▼4.92pp	▼8.24pp

The 1963 Hong Kong Urban Council election was held on 7 March 1963 for the four of the eight elected seats of the Urban Council of Hong Kong. Elsie Elliott, educator and social activist was first elected to the council on the Reform Club ticket, while lawyer Cheung Wing-in became the new elected member for the Hong Kong Civic Association.

== Overview ==
The polling stations increased to four in this year. City Hall in Central, headquarter of the Hong Kong Volunteer Defence Corps in Happy Valley, East wing of the Star Ferry Pier in South Kowloon and North Kowloon Magistracy in North Kowloon. 5,320 of the 25,932 eligible electorates came out and voted which was about 20.5 per cent.

The Civic–Reform Coalition continued and the seats were divided by these two groups. Elsie Elliott was elected to the council for the first time representing the Reform Club and also backed by the Civic Association, succeeding Dr. Alison Bell. The other Club candidate Dr. Raymond Harry Shoon Lee was re-elected and the last seat went to Cheung Wing-in from the Association who replaced Ernest Charles Wong.

Chan Shu-woon, a former Reform Club member quit the Club in 1963 ran as an Independent in the election. Brook Bernacchi, leader of the Reform Club later on sued Chan for alleged corruption during the election campaign. Chan subsequently resigned from the office in 1964 and departed Hong Kong for the United States.

== Results ==
Urban Council Election 1963
Party	Candidate	Votes	%	±%
Independent	Chan Shu-woon	4,006	30.51	+10.61
Reform	Raymond Harry Shoon Lee	2,831	21.56	+8.15
Civic	Cheung Wing-in	2,565	19.54	+7.89
Reform	Elsie Elliott	2,287	17.42	New
Independent	Lee Sheung-pui	1,382	13.74	+8.85
Reform	Napoleon C.Y. Ng	59	0.45	
Turnout		5,320	20.59	
Registered electors		25,837		+9.55

== By-election ==
There was a by-election took place in 1964 for the vacant seat of Chan Shu-woon.

Napoleon Ng representing Civic–Reform Union ran against Independent Solomon Rafeek and got defeated. The Reform Club accused some members of the Civic Association had used their influential to back up Rafeek who was already a member of that Association. The Club found this unacceptable within the terms of the Coalition, and became one of the reasons for the Union being dissolved. Rafeek formally joined the Civic Association in April.
