= Hilton Cheong-Leen =

Hong Kong politician and businessman (1922–2022)

Hilton Cheong-Leen CBE, JP
- 張有興
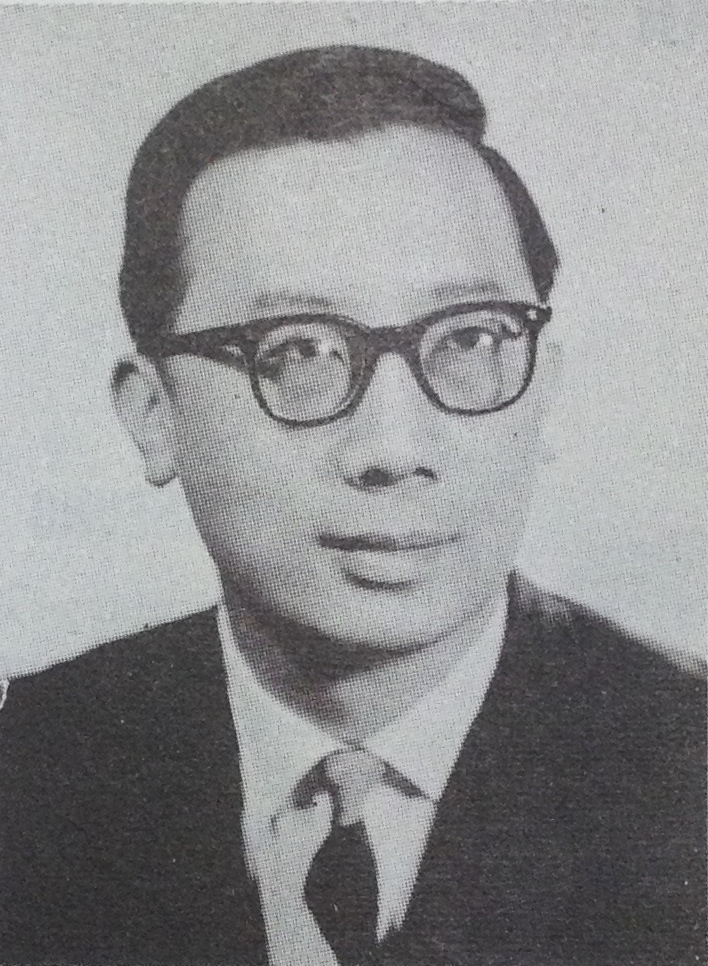
- Cheong-Leen in the 1960s

Member of the Legislative Council
- In office 1 May 1973 – 31 August 1979
- Appointed by: Sir Murray MacLehose
- Preceded by: H. J. C. Browne
- Succeeded by: Wong Po-yan
- In office 1 October 1985 – 30 September 1988
- Preceded by: New constituency
- Succeeded by: Elsie Tu
- Constituency: Urban Council

Chairman of the Urban Council
- In office 1 April 1983 – 31 March 1986
- Preceded by: A. de O. Sales
- Succeeded by: H. M. G. Forsgate

Member of the Urban Council
- In office 1 April 1957 – 31 March 1991
- Preceded by: Woo Pak-chuen
- Succeeded by: San Stephen Wong
- Constituency: Wan Chai (1983–91)

Chairman of the Hong Kong Civic Association
- In office 1968–2004
- Preceded by: Woo Pak-chuen
- Succeeded by: Lam Kwok-wah

Personal details
- Born: 6 August 1922 Georgetown, British Guiana (present-day Georgetown, Guyana)
- Died: 4 January 2022 (aged 99) Hong Kong
- Party: Hong Kong Civic Association
- Spouses: Pauline Chow (m. 1945–1979) Nancy Gan (m. 1988)
- Children: Reginald Cheong-Leen; Susan Cheong-Leen; Franklin Cheong-Leen; Flora Cheong-Leen
- Education: Central High School; La Salle College
- Occupation: Businessman and politician

Hilton Cheong-Leen, CBE, JP (Chinese: 張有興; 6 August 1922 – 4 January 2022) was a Guyana-born Hong Kong politician and businessman. He is the longest uninterrupted serving elected officeholder in Hong Kong history as an elected member of the Urban Council of Hong Kong for 34 years from 1957 to 1991. He was also the first Chinese chairman of the council from 1981 to 1986. He had been a long-time chairman of the Hong Kong Civic Association, one of the two quasi-opposition political groups in the post-war Urban Council. From 1973 to 1979, he was appointed unofficial member of the Legislative Council of Hong Kong. From 1985 to 1988, he was again among the first elected members of the Legislative Council through Urban Council constituency in the first Legislative Council election in 1985.

== Early life and business career ==
Cheong-Leen was born in Georgetown, British Guiana, on 6 August 1922 to a third-generation Chinese mother Elvira Cheong-Leen and father Edward Cheong-Leen who came through Hong Kong from China to join an uncle in Guyana. He was educated at Central High School in Georgetown. He moved to Hong Kong when he was around nine and went to La Salle College in Hong Kong. He had worked in a law firm, an import and export company and as a banker after school.

After the fall of Hong Kong, he moved from Japanese-occupied Hong Kong to unoccupied territory in China, living with his family in Guilin where he worked for the American consulate, and also Kunming, finally returning to Hong Kong after the war. He was a journalist for a period of time, having been the Hong Kong correspondent the BBC. He was offered a job with the South China Morning Post but he followed his family's wish to go into commerce and set up his own import and export firm H. Cheong-Leen & Co. in 1945, importing gifts, premiums and watches.

As a publisher, he also joined the Junior Chamber in 1953 and represented the chamber in the international conference of the Junior Chamber in San Francisco. He was for many years chairman of the Hong Kong Watch Importers Association. He continues to be the honorary life president of the Hong Kong Watch Manufacturers Association.

== Early political career ==
At the time the Urban Council elections, the only direct elections in the colony at the time, were dominated by Brook Bernacchi's Reform Club of Hong Kong, Cheong-Leen founded the Hong Kong Civic Association in 1954 with Roger Lobo and A. de O. Sales, as well as Rev. Brigant Cassian and Dr. Woo Pak-foo. Cheong-Leen was the founding secretary-general of the association and was in the first meeting at a bar on the mezzanine floor of Jimmy's Kitchen in Theatre Lane, Central.

As the representative of the association, he visited London and New York and met with the Colonial Office officials and Members of Parliament (MPs) of different parties including William John Peel, son of Hong Kong Governor Sir William Peel, and United Nations officials Ralph Bunche and Benjamin Victor Cohen over constitutional reform and other issues respectively in the 1950s.

He was also vice-chairman of the United Nations Association of Hong Kong led by Ma Man-fai, whom he befriended during their lives in Kunming. He represented the association in the international conference of the United Nations Association in Bangkok in 1955. As a secretary of the International Association of the Chinese Refugees, he also visited United Nations High Commissioner for Refugees in Geneva and New York on the refuge issues in Hong Kong.

== Urban Councillor ==
Cheong-Leen first contested on the Civic Association ticket in 1956 Urban Council election but was not elected. He ran again in the election in the following year and took the last of the four seats. He remained in the Urban Council for 34 years until he retired in 1991. He took over as the Civic Association chairman in 1968 and had held the position for many years until 2004. The Civic Association at the time positioned itself as more pro-middle-class and moderate as compared to the Reform Club.

As the progress of constitutional reform halted when the Young Plan was shelved, the Civic Association and the Reform Club formed a coalition in 1960 to fight for constitutional reform. In the same year, Cheong-Leen led a delegation to London to make their case to British officials, but their call was not heeded by the government.

Cheong-Leen contested the chairmanship of the Urban Council in 1973 when the post was elected by the council for the first time. He lost to A. de O. Sales but was elected vice-chairman. He went on to become the first Chinese chairman of the council in 1981 after defeating Denny Huang when A. de. O. Sales stepped down. He held the position until 1986.

He had also many other public positions including the chairman of the Hong Kong Girl Guides Island Regional Association, deputy chairman of the council of the Hong Kong Academy for Performing Arts, member of the Fight Crime Committee, board of governors of the Hong Kong Philharmonic Society and the Hong Kong Academy of Ballet. He was also member of the Wan Chai District Board as an ex officio member. For his public services, he was awarded Commander of the Order of the British Empire (CBE) in 1984.

After 34 years of service, Cheong-Leen stepped down as the second longest-serving elected officeholder in Hong Kong history, behind Brook Bernacchi's 41 years, and the longest-uninterrupted-serving elected officeholder, after he decided not to seek re-election of the Urban Council in 1991.

== Legislative Councillor ==
He was first appointed an unofficial member of the Legislative Council of Hong Kong on 1 May 1973 by Governor Sir Murray MacLehose with Guy Sayer to fill the vacancies left by retired H. J. C. Browne and deceased Mary Wong Wing-cheung. In his first term in the council, he made a major speech advocating nine years of free compulsory education and followed up all the way to the Foreign and Commonwealth Office, which made it eventually realised. He retired from the Legislative Council on 31 August 1979 along with James Wu Man-hon after six years of service and were succeeded by Hu Fa-kuang and Wong Po-yan.

In the 1980s, the colonial government carried out the constitutional reform as the Sino-British Joint Declaration was finalised. The first indirect election was introduced in 1985 when 24 seats of the Legislative Council were elected by electoral colleges and functional constituencies. Cheong-Leen defeated Elsie Tu in the Urban Council electoral college which was composed of all members of the Urban Council and became member of the Legislative Council for the second time. He held the position until 1988.

== Personal life and death ==
Hilton Cheong-Leen's first wife, Pauline Chow, was a soprano known as "the nightingale of China". Pauline was born in Peking and was educated at the Bridgman Academy and National Peking University. The couple met in Guilin and Hilton even fancied becoming a base baritone because of her. They married in 1945 until her death in 1979. The couple had two sons and two daughters, Reginald (born in 1951), Susan (born in 1953), Franklin (born in 1958) and Flora (born in 1959). Their fourth child, Flora Cheong-Leen is a famous ballerina and designer who was married to actor Russell Wong.

He married his second wife, Nancy Gan Wan Geok, in 1988 but later divorced. Gan was a classical pianist and porcelain painter educated at Trinity College London and had held exhibitions of her porcelain paintings in Hong Kong from 1988 to 1992. Gan was found dead at the age of 69 in the swimming pool of her bungalow in Singapore on 19 March 2014. Dewi Sukowati, her 18-year-old Indonesian helper from Central Java, was charged with murder. More than a year later, on 21 April 2015, the murder charge was reduced to one of culpable homicide not amounting to murder (or manslaughter). Another year later, on 31 May 2016, Dewi pleaded guilty to the manslaughter charge at the start of her trial at the High Court of Singapore, which sentenced Dewi to 18 years' imprisonment for her unlawful killing of Nancy Gan.

Cheong-Leen died on 4 January 2022, at the age of 99. Chief Executive Carrie Lam, among others, paid tribute to his life.

Political offices
Preceded by Woo Pak-chuen	Member of the Urban Council; 1957–1991	Succeeded by San Stephen Wong
Preceded by Arnaldo de Oliveira Sales	Chairman of the Urban Council; 1981–1986	Succeeded by Hugh Moss Gerald Forsgate
Party political offices
Preceded by Woo Pak-foo	Chairman of the Hong Kong Civic Association; 1968–2004	Succeeded by Lam Kwok-wah
Legislative Council of Hong Kong
Preceded by Herbert John Charles Browne	Unofficial Member; 1973–1979	Succeeded by Wong Po-yan
New constituency	Member of Legislative Council of Hong Kong; Representative for Urban Council; 1985–1988	Succeeded by Elsie Tu
