= 1956 Hong Kong municipal election =

← 1955	7 March 1956	1957 →

6 (of the 8) elected seats to the Urban Council
- Registered: 14,682
- Turnout: 6,040 (41.14%)
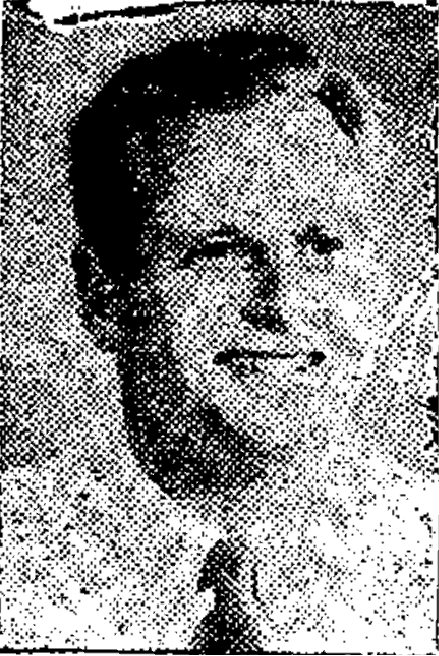

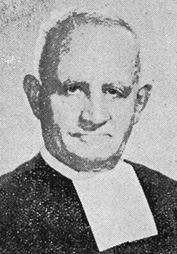
	First party	Second party
Leader	Brook Bernacchi	Brigant Cassian
Party	Reform	Civic
Seats before	4	New party
Seats after	6	2
Seat change	▲2	▲2
Popular vote	17,085	12,907
Percentage	56.97%	43.03%
Swing	▼32.65pp	N/A

The 1956 Hong Kong Urban Council election was held on 7 March 1956. The elected seats were extended from four to eight seats and the election was for the 6 of the 8 elected seats of the Urban Council of Hong Kong. 6,040 of the 14,682, about 41 per cent of the eligible voters cast their ballots in this election, highest turnout rate in the history of the Urban Council elections.

The newly established political group Hong Kong Civic Association won two of the six seats while the rest were won by the Reform Club of Hong Kong. The China Mail commented the election as "the first of a genuine 'political contest'" between two parties. Alison Bell, a Scottish-born Hong Kong doctor ran as the candidate for the Reform Club became the first woman to be elected to the council. The four candidates who gained the highest votes would have a three-year term and the other two would have only a one-year term.

== Overview ==
The election was noted by its high turnout and the competition between two political groups for the first time. 6,048 of the 14,682 eligible voters cast their ballots, which consisted of 41.2 per cent of the electorate, which was the highest turnout rate in the history of the Urban Council elections. Many of the voters were Chinese.

The Reform Club of Hong Kong had a decisive victory over the newly established Hong Kong Civic Association which founded two years ago in 1954 by getting all four candidates of its ticket elected, winning four of the six seats. Alison Bell, a Scottish-born Hong Kong doctor ran as the candidate for the Reform Club became the first woman to be elected to the council. Another Club's newcomer was Chan Shu-woon, son of the former Guangdong warlord Chen Jitang. Only Li Yiu-bor and Dr. Woo Pak-foo on the Association's six-candidate ticket were elected, while Oswald Cheung and Hilton Cheong-Leen failed to get elected. It was regarded as "the first time in the Colony's history the election was a 'political' contest between two parties". The Reform Club supporters who favoured block vote, in which over 4,000 out of at least 4,465 voted according to the Club's ticket, contributed to its victory, while the Civic Association lacked the organisational ability of the Reform Club electorate.

== Results ==
Urban Council Election 1956
Party	Candidate	Votes	%	±%
Reform	Philip Au	4,465	14.89	–25.51
Reform	Raymond Harry Shoon Lee	4,293	14.31	–24.93
Reform	Chan Shu-woon	4,205	14.02	New
Reform	Alison Bell	4,122	13.74	New
Civic	Li Yiu-bor	2,880	9.60	New
Civic	Woo Pak-foo	2,567	8.56	New
Civic	Oswald Cheung	2,229	7.43	
Civic	Hilton Cheong-Leen	2,069	6.90	
Civic	Kot Lun-hung	1,588	5.29	
Civic	Ma Mak	1,574	5.25	
Turnout		6,040	41.14	
Registered electors		14,682		
