= 1959 Hong Kong municipal election =

- 3 March 1959

4 (of the 8) elected seats to the Urban Council
- Registered: 23,584 ▲22.17%
- Turnout: 7,236 (30.68%) ▼5.14pp
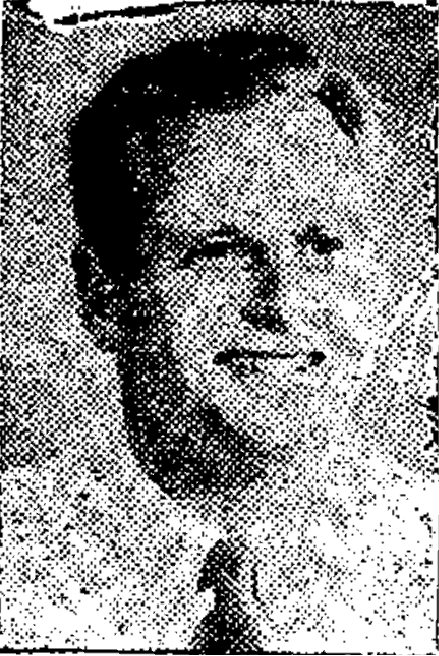

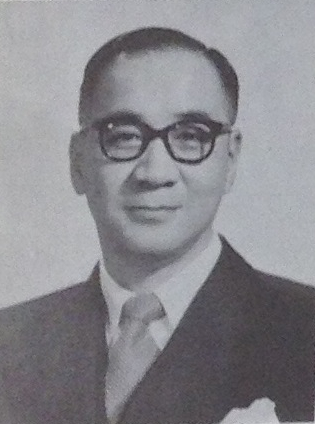
	First party	Second party
Leader	Brook Bernacchi	Woo Pak-foo
Party	Reform	Civic
Seats before	5	3
Seats after	4	4
Seat change	▼1	▲1
Popular vote	12,030	6,010
Percentage	47.67%	23.82%

The 1959 Hong Kong Urban Council election was held on 3 March 1959 for four of the eight elected seats of the Urban Council of Hong Kong. The turnout rate dropped to 30.7 per cent but there were still 7,236 of the 23,584 eligible voters cast their votes, 5,354 ballots from Hong Kong Island and 1,882 from Kowloon. Ernest Charles Wong, chairman of the Tung Wah Group of Hospitals won a seat for the Hong Kong Civic Association of which Philip Au of the Reform Club of Hong Kong retired from, while the other three Club incumbents were re-elected.

== Results ==
Urban Council Election 1959
Party	Candidate	Votes	%	±%
Reform	Chan Shu-woon	5,021	19.90	+5.88
Reform	Alison Mary Spencer Bell	3,624	14.36	+0.62
Reform	Raymond Harry Shoon Lee	3,385	13.41	−0.90
Civic	Ernest Charles Wong	3,076	12.19	New
Independent	Gerald Arthur de Basto	2,964	11.75	
Civic	Cheung Wing-in	2,940	11.65	
Independent	Fogg Yatt-chao	2,550	10.11	
Independent	Lee Sheung-pui	1,234	4.89	
Independent	Lam Yung-hon	441	1.75	
Turnout		7,236	30.68	−5.14
Registered electors		23,584		+22.17
