= 1954 Hong Kong municipal election =

← 1953	24 March 1954	1955 →

2 (of the 4) elected seats to the Urban Council
- Registered: ≈13,700
- Turnout: 4,957 (≈36%)
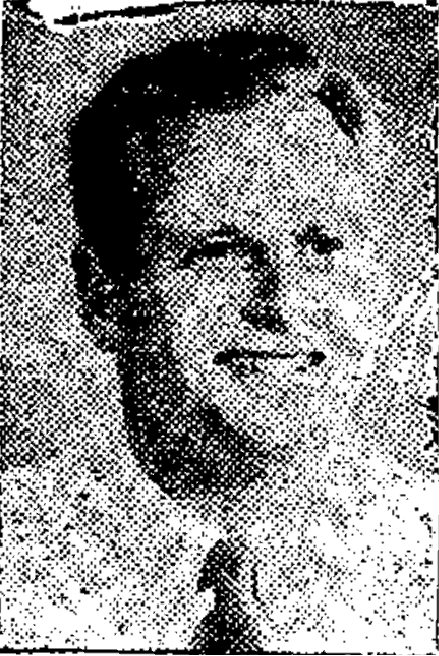
	First party
Leader	Brook Bernacchi
Party	Reform
Seats before	4
Seats after	4
Seat change	Steady
Popular vote	7,773
Percentage	79.64%
Swing	▲8.39pp

The 1954 Hong Kong Urban Council election was held on 24 March 1954 for two of the four elected seats of the Urban Council of Hong Kong.

4,957 of about 13,700 eligible voters cast their votes, 3,887 ballots from the polling station at the Statue Square on Hong Kong Island and 1,070 from St. Andrew's Church on Kowloon. There were five candidates contesting in total. Two incumbents, Philip Au and Dr. Raymond Lee of the Reform Club were able to secure the seats they won in last year.

== Results ==
Urban Council Election 1954
Party	Candidate	Votes	%	±%
Reform	Philip Au	3,943	40.40	+26.72
Reform	Raymond Harry Shoon Lee	3,830	39.24	+24.66
Independent	B. M. Church	1,205	12.81	
Independent	G. O. Jones	391	4.01	−0.35
Independent	F. W. Kendall	391	4.01	
Turnout		4,957	≈36	
Registered electors		≈13,700		
