= Kan Lai Bing =

Librarian from Hong Kong

- 簡麗冰
- Born: July 19, 1933; British Hong Kong
- Died: September 5, 2024 (aged 91)
- Education: University of Hong Kong (B.Sc., 1957); University of California, Berkeley (M.A., M.L.S., 1959)

Kan Lai Bing (Chinese: 簡麗冰; 19 July 1933 – 5 September 2024) was a librarian from Hong Kong who worked to establish librarianship classes and training in the region. She was director of the Chinese University of Hong Kong Library from 1972 until 1983, and then as the University Librarian of the Hong Kong University Libraries until 1999. She was chairperson of the Hong Kong Library Association for five years between 1961 and 1982.

== Early life and education ==
Kan Lai Bing was born in Hong Kong in 1933. She attended Belilios Public School. She attended the University of Hong Kong (HKU), graduating in 1957 with a Bachelor of Science (B.Sc.) degree, with concentrations in botany, zoology, chemistry, and physics. She later pursued postgraduate studies in the United States at the University of California, Berkeley, where she was a Carnegie Scholar. During her time at Berkeley, Kan earned a Master of Arts (M.A.) in Zoology and a Master of Library Science (M.L.S.) in Library Science, both awarded in 1959. After returning to Hong Kong, she furthered her academic credentials by obtaining a Doctor of Philosophy (Ph.D.) in Chinese studies under the supervision of Jao Tsung-I at HKU. Her dissertation is titled "The organization and treatment of libraries in the Ming and Ch‘ing dynasties (Chinese: 明淸藏書制度)".

== Career ==
Kan began working at the University of Hong Kong (HKU) Libraries in 1959. She started as an assistant librarian, and then became a sub-librarian by 1970. In 1961 and 1962, she was a part-time lecturer in invertebrate zoology and parasitology at Chung Chi College. In 1964, she established Hong Kong's "first certificate course for Library Assistants" in HKU's Extra-Mural Studies Department, in collaboration with the Hong Kong Library Association. In 1968, she trained as a MEDLARS search analyst in Bethesda, Maryland. From 1970 to 1972, she was a deputy librarian at HKU. In 1972, she began working at the Chinese University of Hong Kong Library, serving as university librarian and director of the library system until 1983. She oversaw the opening of the university's library, which had begun construction in 1970 and officially opened in December 1972. In 1983, she returned to HKU, working as a university librarian until 1999, and then as a senior advisor until July 2024.

From the late 1970s and 1990, Kan helped establish "graduate-level training for Hong Kong Librarians".

From 2001 to August 2008, she worked for HKU SPACE as a senior consultant, planning and leading LIS programs. She was a member of the Library Advisory Committee of the Home Affairs Bureau in the Hong Kong Government from 2008 until 2010.

Kan served on various committees in the Hong Kong Library Association, and was its chairperson in 1961, 1962, 1970, 1976 and 1982.

Kan was particularly interested in information storage and retrieval. As a researcher, she focused on the history and ongoing development of libraries in Hong Kong and mainland China.

== Personal life and death ==
Kan passed away on September 5, 2024.

== Publications ==
=== Books ===
- Kan, Lai-bing (1963). Libraries in Hong Kong: A Directory. Hong Kong Library Association.
- Julia L. Y., Chan; Yan, Angela S. W.; Kan, Lai-bing, eds. (June 1996). Libraries and Information Centres in Hong Kong. Hong Kong University Press. ISBN 9789622094093.

=== Chapters ===
- Kan, Lai-bing (1997). "Librarianship Training in Hong Kong". Education for Librarianship in China. Bloomsbury Academic. pp. 133–142. ISBN 9780720121933.
- Kan, Lai-bing; Leong, Mary (2003-05-20). "Hong Kong Library Association". In Drake, Miriam (ed.). Encyclopedia of Library and Information Science. Vol. 2. Taylor & Francis.

=== Articles ===
- Hand, C.; Kan, Lai Bing (1961), The medusae of Chukchi and Beaufort seas of the arctic ocean including the description of a new species of Eucodonium (Hydrozoa: Anthomedusae), Arctic Institute of North America, pp. 1–23
- Kan, L. B. (January 1965). "Introduction to Chinese Medical Literature". Bulletin of the Medical Library Association. 53 (1): 60–70. ISSN 0025-7338. PMC 198229. PMID 14223740.
- Kan, L. B. (1976-10-01). "Provision of library services by Hong Kong schools". International Library Review. 8 (4): 461–475. doi:10.1016/0020-7837(76)90010-8. ISSN 0020-7837.
- Kan, Lai-bing; Myers, Ramon Hawley; Tsuneishi, Warren M. (1978). "Organizations and Institutions". Journal of East Asian Libraries (55).
- Kecskes, Lily; Wu, Ai-hwa; Martinique, Edward; Kan, Lai-bing (1989). "Librarians". Journal of East Asian Libraries (87).

== Awards and recognition ==
In 1994, Kan was awarded the degree of Honorary Doctor of Letters (HonDLitt) by Charles Sturt University, acknowledging her academic and professional impact in the field.

In 1997, she was named an Honorary University Fellow by the University of Hong Kong, her alma mater. The following year, she was conferred the honorary title of Honorary University Fellow by Charles Sturt University, Australia.

In 2002, she was awarded the HKSAR Medal of Honour for her valuable contribution to the public library services and the development and training of librarians in Hong Kong.

In 2005, she established the Dr. Kan Lai Bing Award to "recognize outstanding graduates of the Graduate Diploma of Information Studies".

In 2017, she was awarded HKU SPACE Honorary Fellow.

On 29 July 2025, The University of Hong Kong hosted the Unveiling Ceremony of the Memorial Plaque of Dr Kan Lai Bing. The event also celebrated the donation of HKD 10 million by Kan’s family, which will support the Fung Ping Shan Library (Chinese: 香港大學馮平山圖書館) Centenary Development Plan.
