= Charles Sin =

Hong Kong lawyer and businessman

Charles Cho Chiu Sin, OBE (born Chinese: 冼祖昭; 1937 – 2021) was a Hong Kong lawyer and businessman. He was the former chairman of the Stock Exchange of Hong Kong from 1987 to 1988.

== Biography ==
Sin was born in 1937 into a lawyer family. He was graduated from the Queen's College, Hong Kong and Cambridge University with a law degree. He practiced law upon his return to Hong Kong and became an elected member of the Urban Council first elected in 1971 for the Hong Kong Civic Association and also the Acting Committee of the Hong Kong Housing Society. He was also the chairman of the Home Ownership Scheme Committee of the Hong Kong Housing Authority and the Management Committee of the Hong Kong Housing Authority.

He was director of the Associated International Hotels Limited and the Tian Teck Land Limited from the 1985 and 1984 respectively. He was also the company secretary of the Tian Teck Land Limited from 1990 to 2004. Between 1985 and 1986, Sin was the chairman of the Kam Ngan Stock Exchange and subsequently the chairman of the Stock Exchange of Hong Kong between 1987 and 1988 when the four major exchanges merged in 1986. For his contributions, he was awarded Officer of the Order of the British Empire (OBE) in 1987.

He was involved in a corruption allegation of the Stock Exchange in the 1988 and was investigated by Independent Commission Against Corruption but was not found guilty in 1992. In 1996, he sued Tian Tian Daily News for libelling in an article on 28 October 1996. He won the lawsuit in 2002 and was compensated for three million Hong Kong dollars.

Political offices
Preceded by Solomon Rafeek	Member of the Urban Council; 1971–1975	Succeeded by Henry Luk
Business positions
Preceded by Ronald Li	Chairman of the Stock Exchange of Hong Kong; 1987–1988	Succeeded by Lee Quo-wei
