= Hong Kong University Libraries =

University library system in Hong Kong

The Hong Kong University Libraries (HKUL), or The University of Hong Kong Libraries, is the academic library system of the University of Hong Kong in Hong Kong. It includes the Main Library, Dental Library, Fung Ping Shan Library, Lui Che Woo Law Library, Music Library, Tin Ka Ping Education Library, Yu Chun Keung Medical Library, and Ko Wong Wai Ching Wendy Fine Arts Digital Library, among which the Main Library was founded in 1912. There are 4,000,000 volumes of books, over 24,000 periodical titles and over 2,800 readers’ places. The library system is a member of the Joint University Librarians Advisory Committee (JULAC).

== Main Library ==
=== History ===
In October 1912, the Hong Kong University Library was established in two rooms of about 288 square meters, and a small Medical section.

In 1932, the university's Chinese library was established through a generous donation by the late Mr Fung Ping Shan. It was officially opened by Sir William Peel, the then Governor of Hong Kong.

In 1961, the Fung Ping Shan Library moved into the Main Library building.

In 1991, the New Wing of the library building was opened.

In 2010, the Document Conservation and Restoration Centre of the University of Hong Kong Library was established.

=== Present situation ===
The Main Library has grown into a modern academic library with a collection of materials in arts, humanities, architecture, social sciences, and science and technology. The Main Library Building is composed of the Old and New Wings. The Old Wing was opened in 1961 and renovated in 1992/93. The New Wing was opened in 1991. The library now contains over 1,200,000 volumes of materials, well-stocked with materials on China and the Far East and many of these materials are stored in its Rare Book Room.

== Branche libraries ==
=== Dental Library ===
The Kong Kong University Dental Library is the only dental professional library in Hong Kong. Established in 1981, it has developed into an academic library with a collection of up-to-date resources in oral health sciences. The library is now located on the 5th and 6th floors of the Prince Philip Dental Hospital, and is dedicated to supporting the Faculty of Dentistry of Hong Kong University.

=== Fung Ping Shan Library ===
The Fung Ping Shan Library mainly collects Chinese and Japanese books, and a small number of Korean books. The library was opened on December 14, 1932, by the Governor of Hong Kong, Sir William Peel. It was named the "Fung Ping Shan Library" in memory of the donation made by businessman Mr. Fung Ping Shan. In January 1962, the Library moved to the main library of the university, and the old site was converted into the Fung Ping Shan Museum.

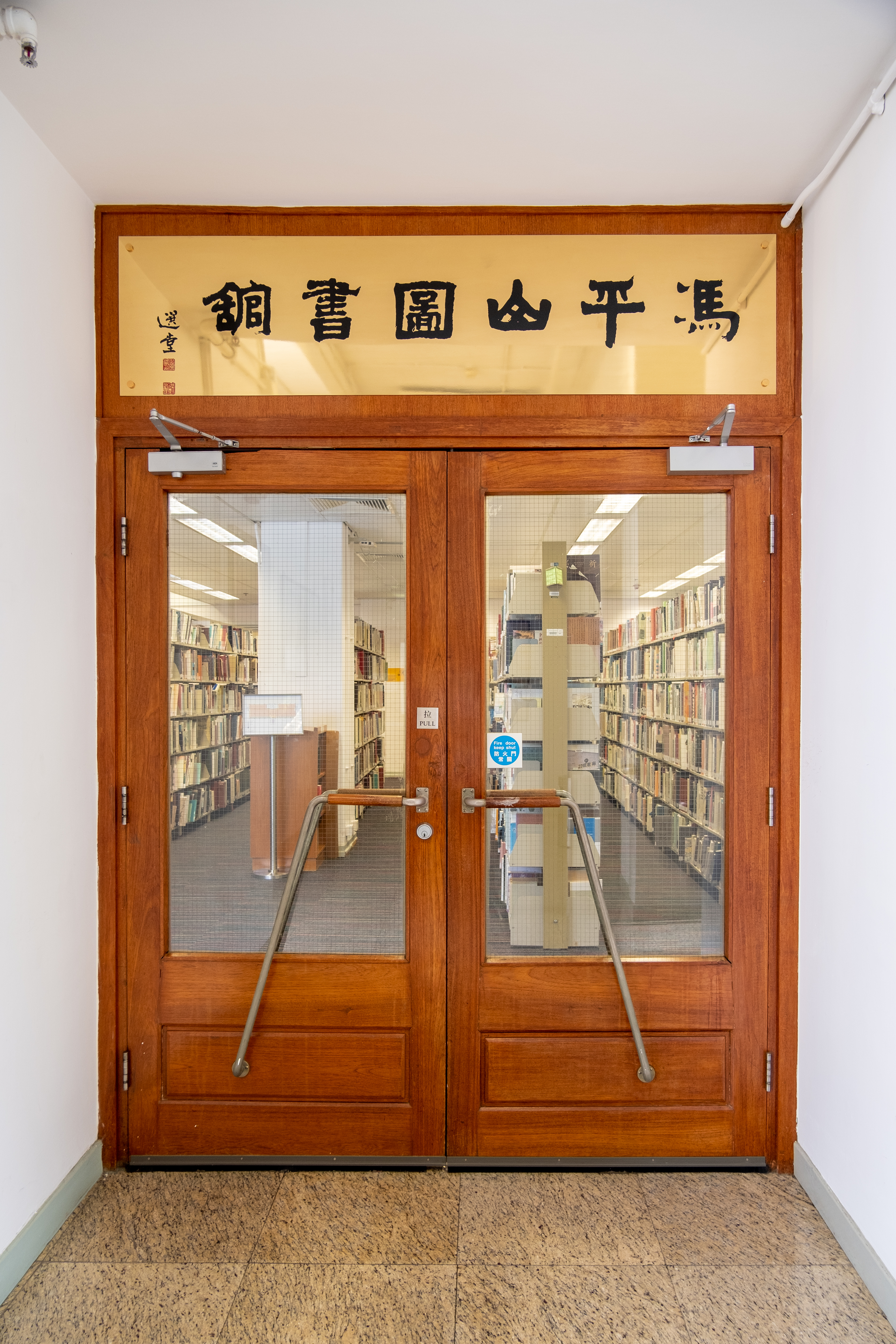
Main entrance on the 5th floor of Fung Ping Shan Library

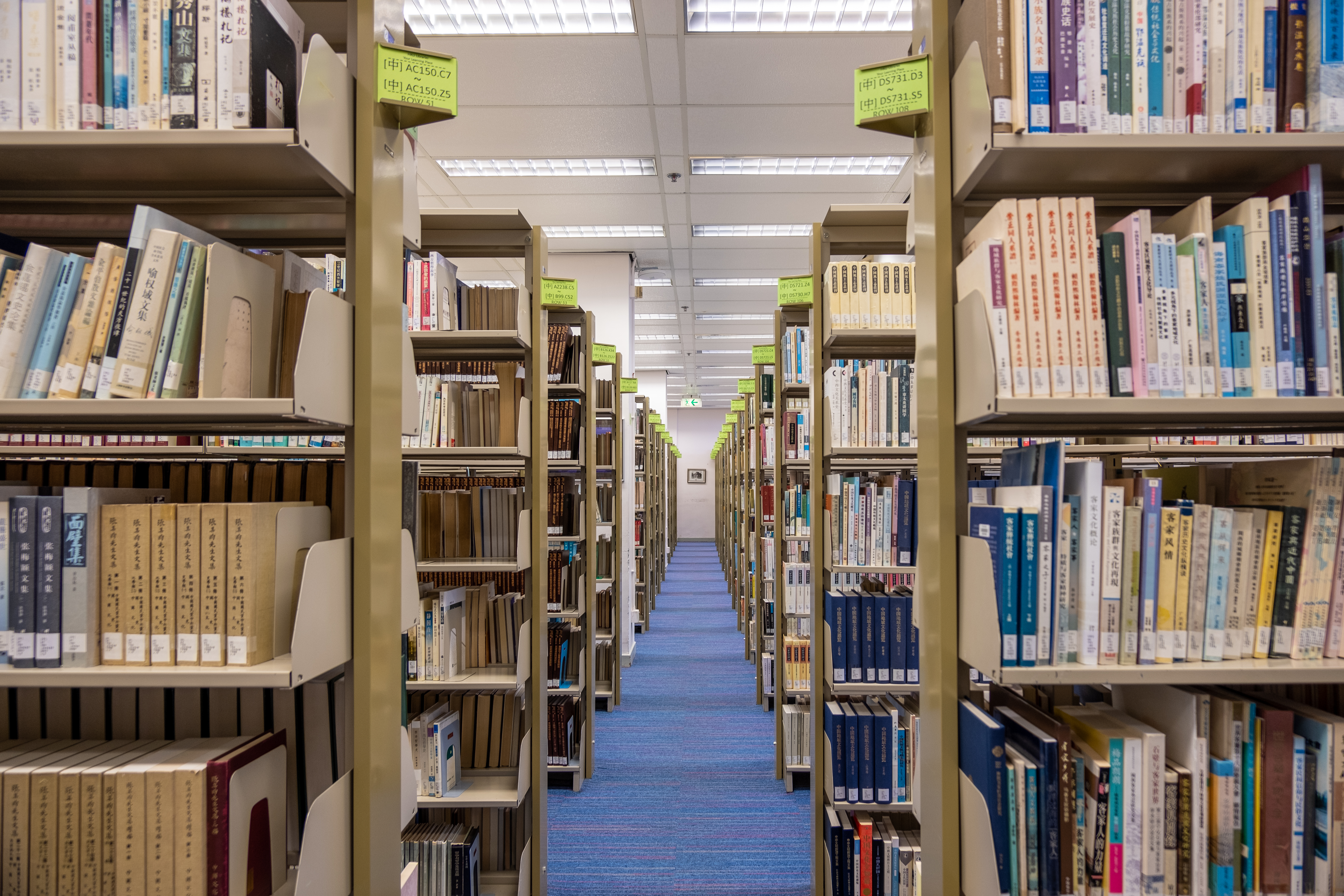
Open-shelf library on the 5th floor

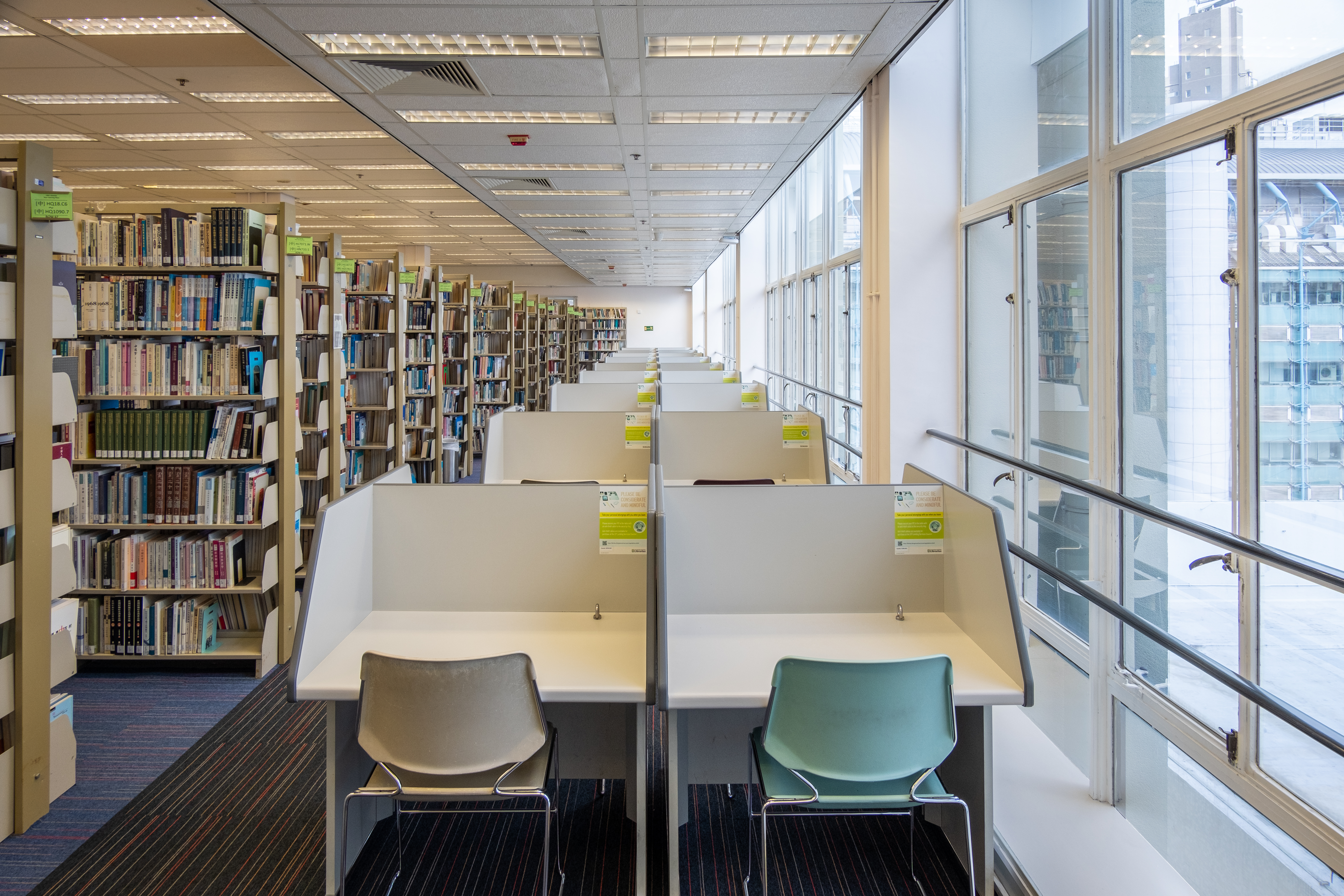
Study Area on the 6th floor

=== Lui Che Woo Law Library ===
The Law Library of Hong Kong University was renamed "Lui Che Woo Law Library" in 1997, in acknowledge of the generous donation from Dr Lui Che Woo. The library has rich collections of materials from Hong Kong, the United Kingdom, and major Commonwealth jurisdictions, as well as from the Asia-Pacific jurisdictions. It provides support for the students and staff of the Faculty of Law of Hong Kong University, and members of the Hong Kong legal profession.

=== Music Library ===
The Music Library was opened in 1982 with only two rooms in the Main Building of Hong Kong University. And now it has developed into a modern academic library with an extensive collection on contemporary composers’ scores and Western and East Asian facsimile scores. The library is dedicated to supporting the teaching and research of the Department of Music, though students from other departments of the university can also go to the library for quite study and music enjoyment.

=== Tin Ka Ping Education Library ===
The Education Library was established in 1978. It was renamed the "Tin Ka Ping Education Library" in 2017 for the support from the Tin Ka Ping Foundation.

=== Yu Chun Keung Medical Library ===
The Medical Library was founded in 1887 with the Hong Kong College of Medicine for Chinese, predecessor of the present University of Hong Kong Li Ka Shing Faculty of Medicine. It was later renamed "Yu Chun Keung Medical Library" for the generous donation and support of Mr Yu Chun Keung. The Library has been a World Health Organization (WHO) Depository Library since 1993, providing support mainly for the University of Hong Kong Faculty of Medicine.

=== Ko Wong Wai Ching Wendy Fine Arts Digital Library ===
The Digital Fine Arts Library was opened in 2024 in the Main Library (3F), predominantly supported by Professor Norman Ko Wah Man and named after his late wife, Mrs. Wong Wai Ching Wendy. The space includes lounge, immersive, and gallery areas alongside a meditation room. Instead of books, the library hosts collections of art pieces and sculptures in an open-plan design, fostering discussions and creativity. Professor Ko hypothesised that the empty 'cave-like' environment would "stimulate a deeper understanding an appreciation for fine arts" as well as a "quest for knowledge".

== See also ==
- Chinese University of Hong Kong Library
- Peking University Libraries
- National Taiwan University Library
- List of libraries in Hong Kong
