= Ronald Li =

Hong Kong investor (1929–2014)

Ronald Li Fook-shiu

Chairman of the Stock Exchange of Hong Kong
- In office 1986–1987
- Preceded by: New office
- Succeeded by: Charles Sin

Personal details
- Born: 10 February 1929 Hong Kong
- Died: 27 December 2014 (aged 85) Queen Mary Hospital, Pok Fu Lam, Hong Kong
- Spouse: Irene Li Hiu-wah
- Children: Alfred Ronald Kwok-lung Li
- Education: Wittenberg University; University of Pennsylvania
- Occupation: Accountant and investor

Ronald Li Fook-shiu (Chinese: 李福兆; 10 February 1929 – 27 December 2014) was the founder and former chairman of the Stock Exchange of Hong Kong and died of cancer.

Li was arrested twice by the Independent Commission Against Corruption in December 1987 and in 1991 for bribery and was expelled to Stanley Prison.

== Biography ==
Li was born into the Li family in Hong Kong in 1929. He was the youngest son of Li Koon-chun. His brother Simon Li Fook-sean was a senior judge and acting Chief Justice of the Supreme Court of Hong Kong. His nephews include former Legislative Councillor David Li Kwok-po, the Bank of East Asia chairman and Arthur Li Kwok-cheung, deputy chairman at the bank, former Secretary for Education and former Dean of the Faculty of Medicine at the Chinese University of Hong Kong, latterly, Chairman of the Council of the University of Hong Kong.

Li was enrolled to the University of Hong Kong in 1946 and soon was sent to the Wittenberg University in the United States. He graduated from the University of Pennsylvania with a Master of Business Administration degree and became a chartered accountant in 1951.

He founded the Far East Exchange with his brother Li Fook-hing in 1969 to break the Hong Kong Stock Exchange's monopoly in the buying and selling of stocks. He was hence called the "Godfather of the Stock Market." In 1986, Li helped merge the Far East Stock Exchange with three other exchanges into the Stock Exchange of Hong Kong, precursor of today's Hong Kong Exchanges and Clearing, and became its first chairman.

During the Black Monday market crash, he closed the stock market for four days. The Hang Seng Index fell by 33% after the market reopened which drew criticism against Li's decision. He was only elected vice-chairman of the Stock Exchange in the end of the year.

Li was later arrested by the Independent Commission Against Corruption (ICAC) in December 1987 and in 1991 convicted of taking bribes in return for approving listings during his office as the Chairman of the Stock Exchange of Hong Kong in 1987. He was sent to Stanley Prison, and served 30 months of a four-year sentence.

He was reported to be worth HK$10 billion before he was jailed, and even during his prison term his vast stock portfolio was said to be earning almost HK$5 million per day, while Li toiled for HK$9 in the prison library. After his release in 1993, he said he would devote himself into a life of "golf, films and travel." He spent most of his time in Thailand after prison until he found out he had cancer in 2012 and moved back to Hong Kong.

Li died of cancer at the Queen Mary Hospital at the age of 85 on 27 December 2014.

== See also ==
- Four big families of Hong Kong

Business positions
New office	Chairman of the Hong Kong Stock Exchange; 1986–1987	Succeeded by Charles Sin
