= National Taiwan University Library =

Academic library in Taipei, Taiwan

National Taiwan University Library 國立臺灣大學圖書館
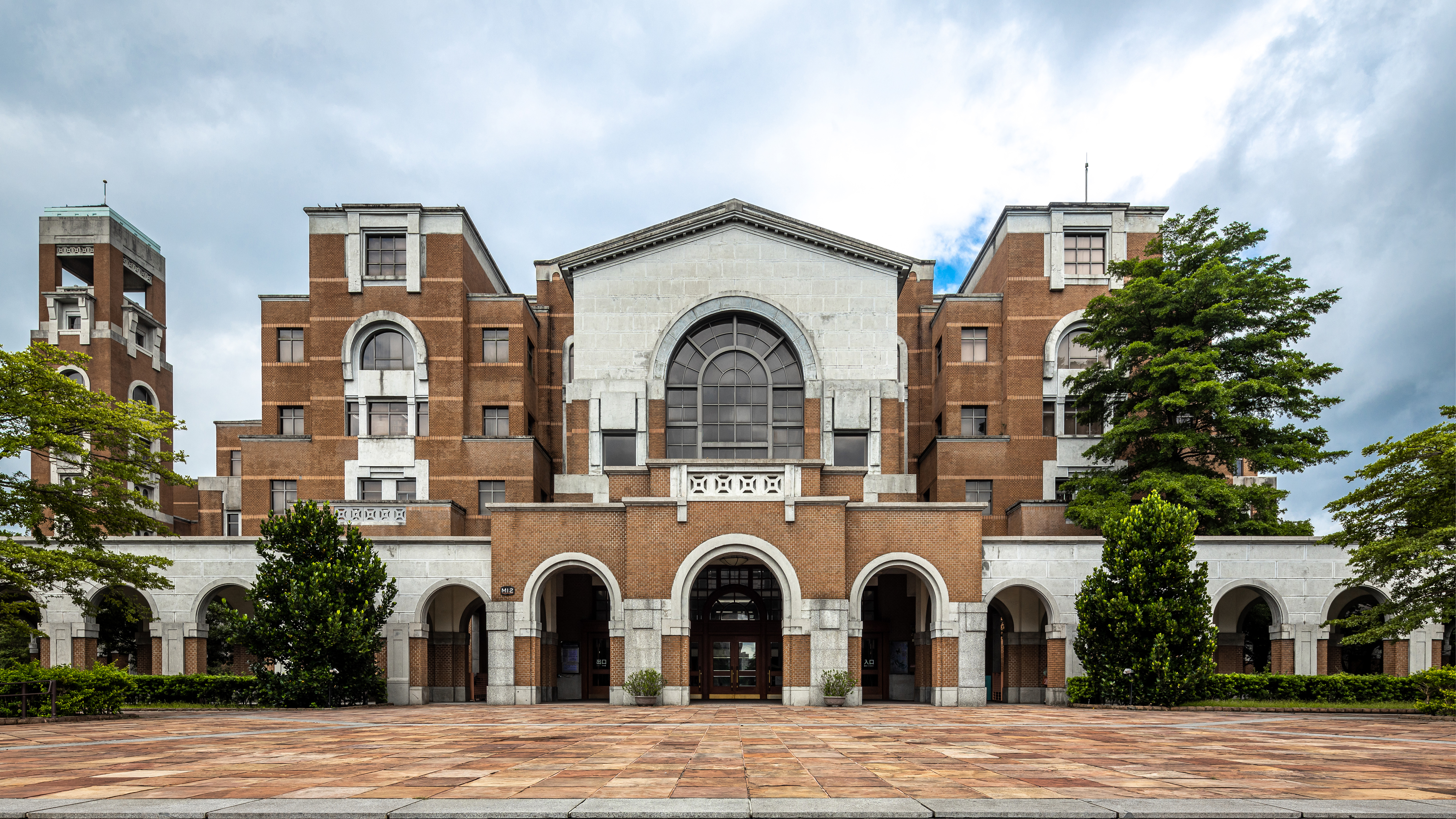
- National Taiwan University Library
- 25°01′02.1″N 121°32′25.5″E
- Location: No. 1, Section 4, Roosevelt Road, Da'an District, Taipei City, Republic of China (Taiwan)
- Type: University library
- Established: March 1928
- Branches: 9

Collection
- Items collected: Books, periodicals, newspapers, magazines, sound and music recordings, patents, databases, maps, stamps, prints, drawings, manuscripts, rare books and thread-bound volumes
- Size: The total number of items is 8.4 million, including more than 250,000 rare Chinese and foreign ancient books.（year 2023）
- Legal deposit: Designated by the Ministry of Culture as a government publication depository library in accordance with Article 15 of the Library Act and the Guidelines for the Management of Government Publications

Access and use
- Access requirements: On-campus students and the public outside the University

Other information
- Director: Lin Qixiu (林奇秀)
- Parent organization: National Taiwan University
- Website: Main Library, Medical Science branch, Sicial Science branch

The National Taiwan University Library (NTU Library) is the academic library of National Taiwan University (NTU), a national university in Taipei, Taiwan. It is the largest university library in Taiwan. Founded in 1928, the NTU Library includes the University Main Library, branch libraries, and the libraries of various departments and institutes on campus.

== History ==
=== Main Library ===
The NTU Main Library was formerly the "Taipei Imperial University Affiliated Library" built in 1928 during the Japanese colonial period of Taiwan. The original site is now the NTU History Museum, which manages the collection in a closed-shelf manner. After Japan's defeat and surrender in August 1945, the Republic of China government took over Taiwan and took over Taipei Imperial University on November 15 of the same year. It was renamed National Taipei University and then National Taiwan University in December. The library was also renamed "National Taiwan University Library".

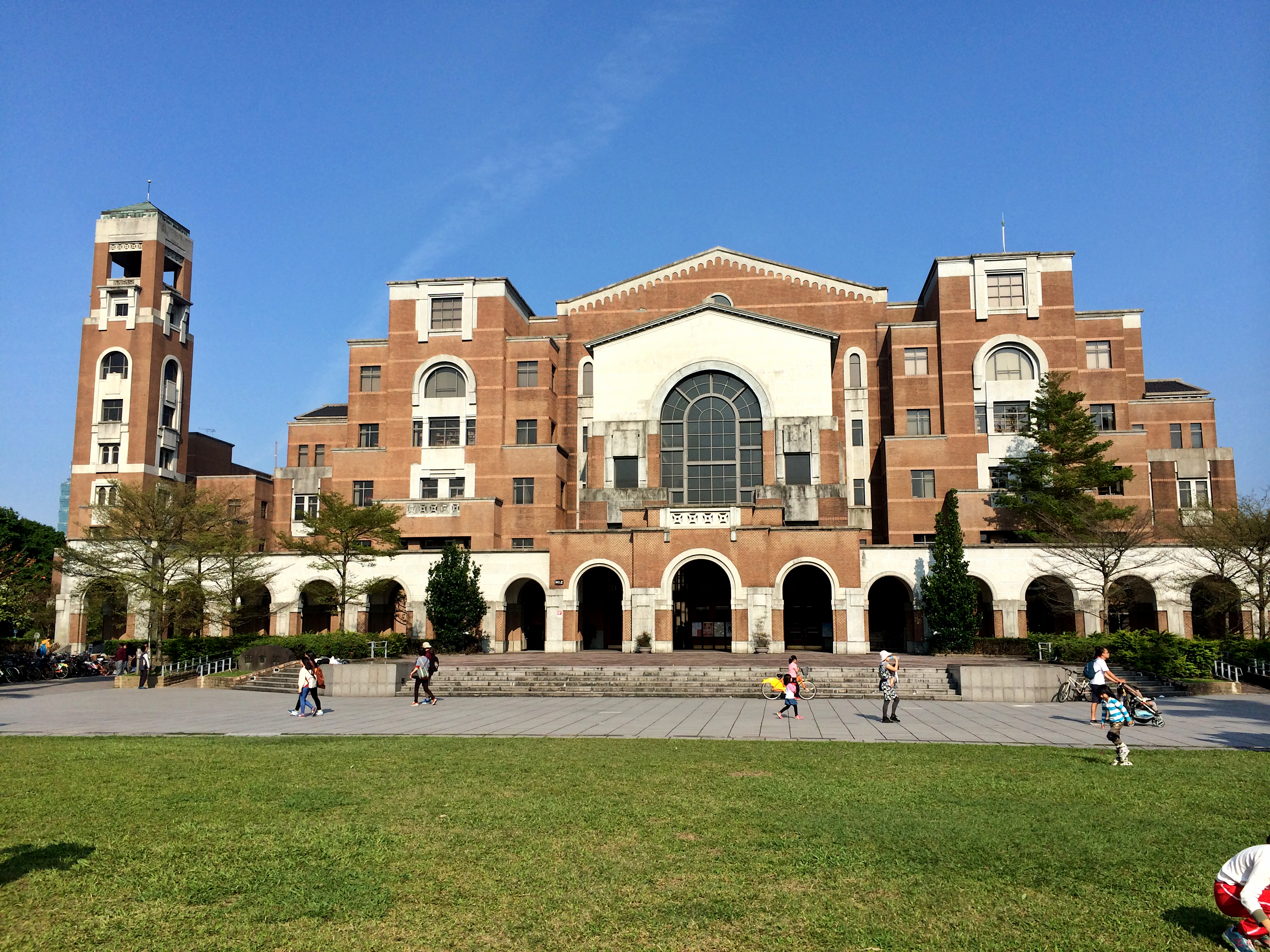
The National Taiwan University Main Library, completed in 1998.

The NTU Library (old building) initially had a small collection, and due to insufficient space for the increase in books, planning for the construction of a new library began in 1982. Since 1989, budgets have been allocated annually for the construction of the new library, and the current "National Taiwan University Main Library (abbreviated as the Main Library)" was completed and put into use on November 14, 1998. In 2014, an Operation Planning Committee was established to carry out a plan to reshape the space and services of the Main Library. In October 2022, alumni of the Department of Economics of NTU funded the renovation of the first floor of the Main Library. The renovation was completed on August 16, 2023 and named Zhiqiang Hall. A new multi-purpose sharing area and digital media area were added.

With a collection of 4.3 million volumes, the NTU Main Library is now the largest comprehensive university library in Taiwan. The library is open to Faculty, staff, students of the University, as well as employees hired by academic partners, retirees and alumni. Non-school personnel and foreigners can exchange their vouchers for temporary reading cards.

=== Branch Libraries ===
In addition to the main library in the main campus, there are also the Automated Library Service Center, the Medical Library, the Koo Chen-fu Memorial Library, and the libraries of the departments of physics, mathematics, chemistry, oceanography, library and information, and law.

==== Automated Library Service Center ====
Located on the 2nd to 4th floors of the basement of the Comprehensive Teaching Building on the main campus, it is Taiwan's first high-density automated library, capable of accommodating more than 1.2 million books. It was put into use on October 30, 2018, and a service center was set up on the 1st floor of the Comprehensive Teaching Building to provide access services.

==== The Koo Chen-fu Memorial Library of the School of Social Sciences ====
The "School of Law and Social Sciences Library Branch" located on the Xuzhou Road Law School campus was renamed the "Social Science Resource Service Section" when the School of Social Sciences moved back to the main campus in 2014. On September 15 of the same year, the library officially opened in the new School of Social Sciences building. The physical collection was merged from the Law and Social Sciences Branch, the Law and Political Studies Library, and the Economics Research Institute Library on the Xuzhou Road campus, totaling approximately 220,000 volumes. Due to the donation from Koo Chen-fu, an alumnus of the Department of Political Science, it was named the "School of Social Sciences Koo Chen-fu Memorial Library."

==== Medical Library ====
In April 1899, the "Taiwan Governor-General's Medical School Library" was established. In 1936, it was renamed the "Medical Section of the Taipei Imperial University Affiliated Library". In 1945, it was renamed the "National Taiwan University Medical School Library". In April 1989, it moved from the main campus to the National Taiwan University Hospital in the city center campus. In February 1991, it merged with the Medical Library. In February 2018, it was renamed the current "National Taiwan University Medical Library". In 2017, the overall space renovation was planned and completed in June 2022; it was put into operation on September 5 of the same year, with a collection of approximately 111,000 books.

==== Law School Library ====
On July 13, 2009, the Law School moved from the Xuzhou Road campus back to the Wancai Building on the main campus, and used the 1st and 2nd floors as the "Law School Library". The library collection includes books, periodicals, reference books, etc. from the former Law Society Branch Library on Xuzhou Road Campus and the Graduate School of Law and Politics Library, totaling over 87,000 volumes; special collection materials include the Taipei Bar Association collection, documents of Okamatsu Santaro, Bar Association roster, Japanese court archives, and Grand Justices Conference materials. On June 27, 2016, the Tsai Wan-tsai family of the Fubon Group sponsored the renovation of the library to increase the capacity of books and periodicals, and renamed it the "Law School Library ". It was opened to the public on September 12 of the same year.

==== Library and Information Science Department Practice Library ====
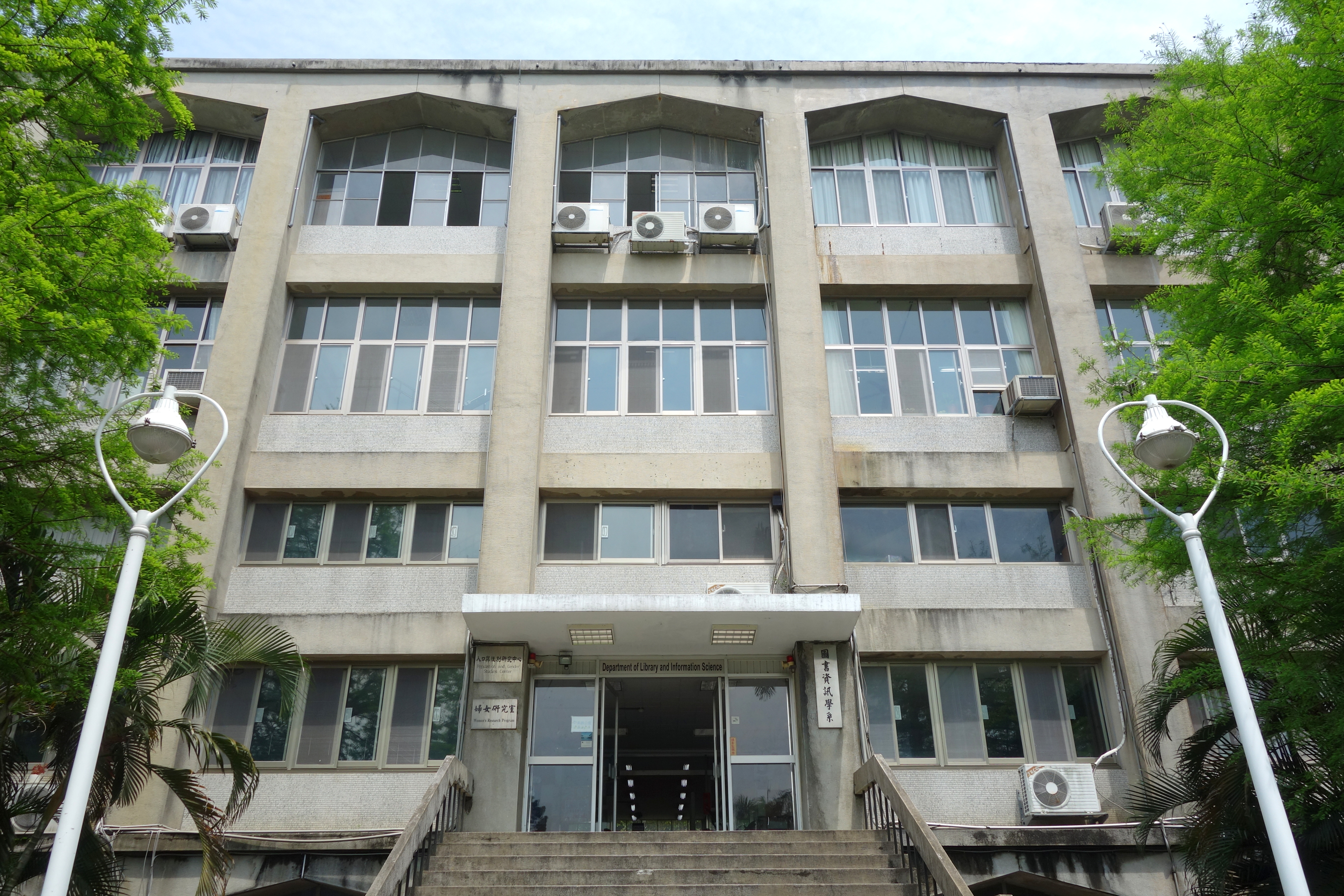
Formerly the Research Library, now the Library and Information Science Department Library

Formerly the National Taiwan University Research Library established in 1968, it was transferred to the Department of Library and Information Science in 1998. The second floor is the current "Library and Information Science Department Practice Library" and the first floor is a closed-shelf bookcase. The library houses over 32,000 volumes, including Chinese and Western books and periodicals, dissertations, and children's and youth books.

==== Physics Department Library ====
The library was established in 1946 in the old building of the Department of Physics, and moved to Room 310 on the 3rd floor of the new building of the Center for Condensed Matter Science and of the Department of Physics in February 2001. It has a collection of approximately 60,000 volumes.

==== Mathematics Department Library ====
The library was established in 1961, and moved to the Astronomy and Mathematics Building, which was built in cooperation with the Academia Sinica on January 4, 2010. It is also the library of the Institute of Mathematics of the Academia Sinica. The library has a collection of approximately 53,000 volumes.

==== Chemistry Department Library ====
The library was established in 1966, and was also the library of the Center for the Advancement of Chemistry, Division of Natural Sciences, National Science Council. In September 1986, it moved to the Institute of Atomic and Molecular Sciences of the Academia Sinica on campus. The library has a collection of approximately 20,000 volumes.

==== Institute of Oceanography Library ====
In 1998, the Northern Region Earth Science Book and Periodical Service Center and the Institute of Oceanography Library were established in cooperation with the Ministry of Science and Technology. The library has a collection of approximately 8,000 volumes.

== Related institutions ==
=== Museum group ===
The integration of the museums on the University campus was completed on November 15, 2007. The member museums are: the University History Museum, the Anthropology Museum, the Geological Specimen Museum, the Physical Cultural Relics Department, the Insect Specimen Museum, the Agricultural Exhibition Museum, the Plant Specimen Museum, the Zoological Museum, the Archives Museum, the Medical Humanities Museum and the Art History Institute Art Museum.

=== The General Museum Preparatory Office ===
The office assists in the revision and digitization of relevant laws and regulations on teaching and research assets.

=== Taiwan Aboriginal Book and Information Center ===
Started operation on July 21, 2006, the library has been collecting books and research resources on Taiwan's indigenous peoples. The collection has about 8,600 items. Due to the expiration of the plan, it will be temporarily closed in 2025.

=== NTU Buddhist Digital Library ===
In 1995, the late Professor Shi Hengqing of the Department of Philosophy founded the "Buddhist Online Database". In 1999, it was renamed the "Buddhist Digital Library and Museum". On April 1, 2003, it was transferred to the National Library for operation. On August 1, 2020, it was renamed the current "NTU Buddhist Digital Library". It is dedicated to collecting secondary research documents and classics of Buddhism from around the world, and contains a bibliography of approximately 500,000 articles.

== Architectural features ==
=== Main Library ===
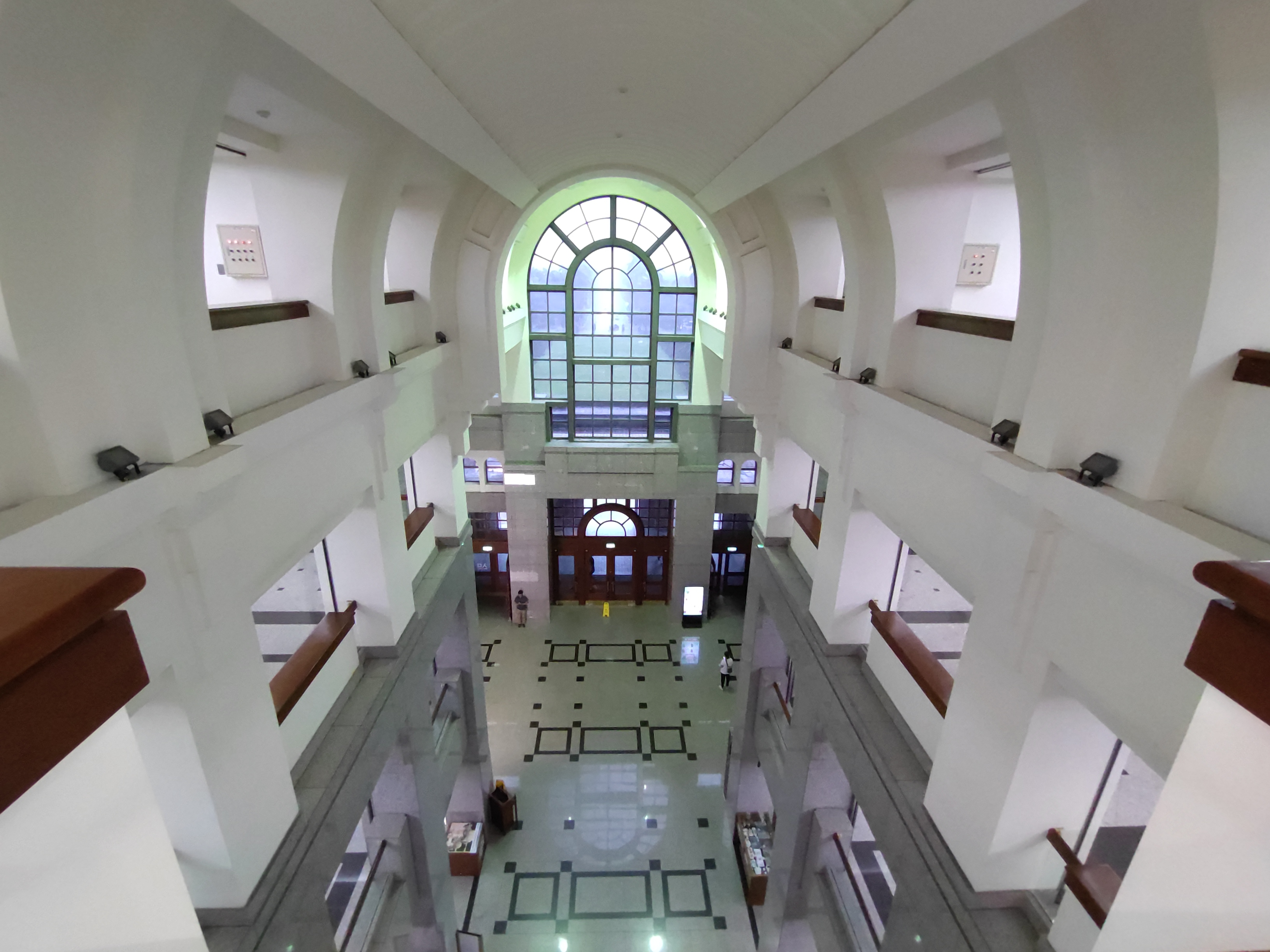
Main entrance hall inside the main building

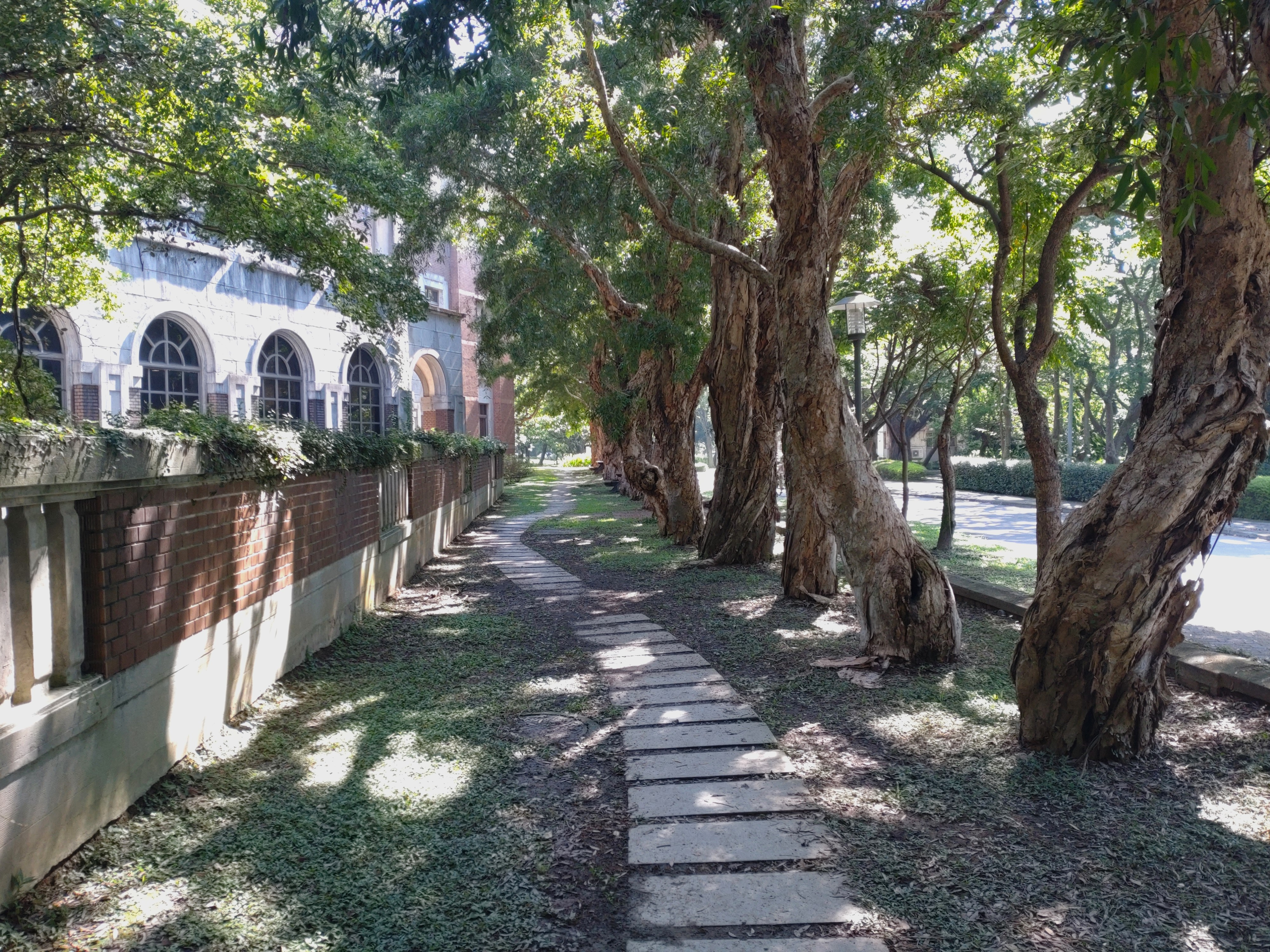
A view of the Melaleuca australis trail next to the main building

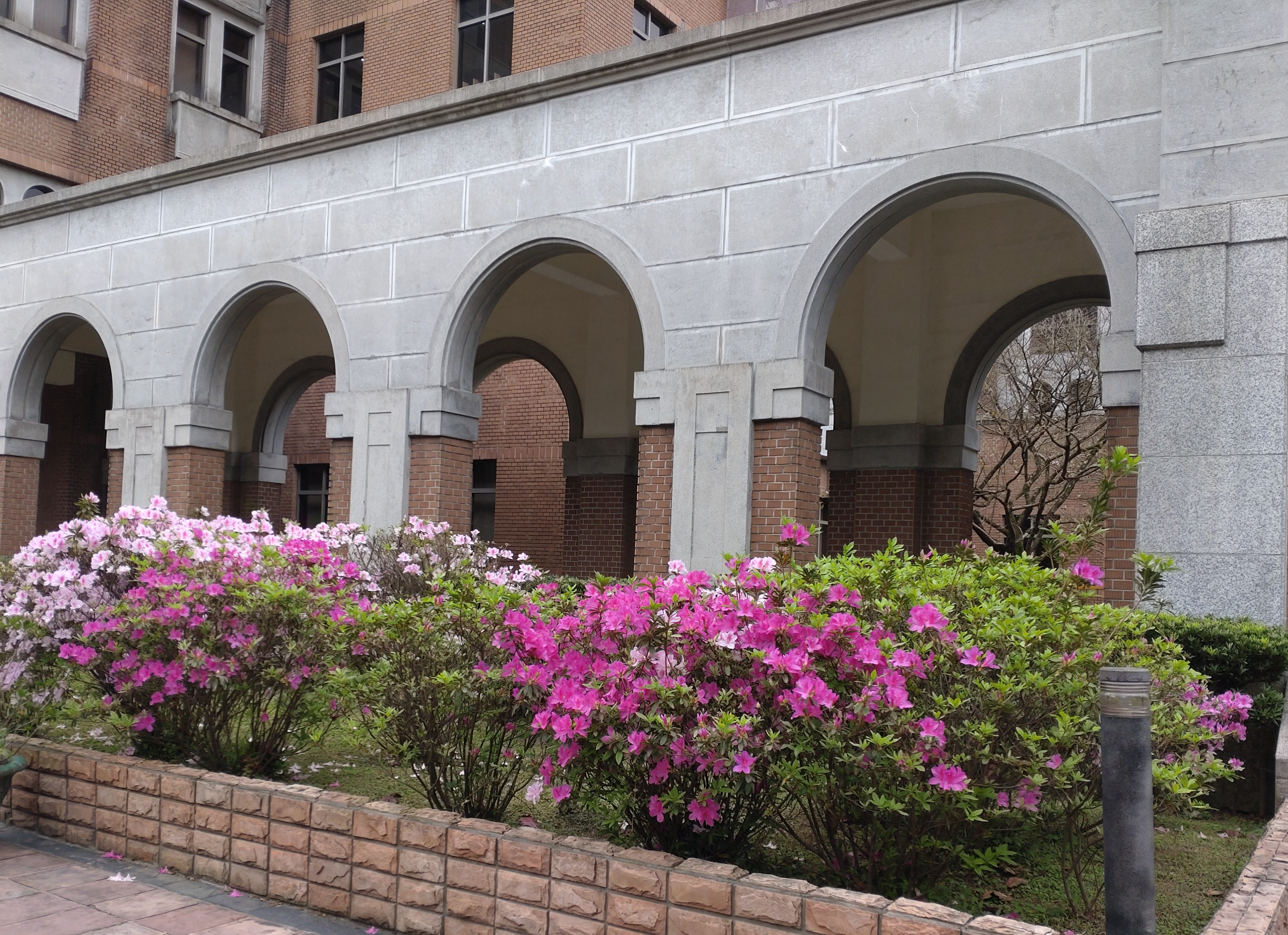
A view of the azaleas in the corridor of the main building

Located at the end of Coconut Grove Avenue, the Library is the geometric center of the NTU campus and an important landmark building on campus. Its exterior is in line with the original campus architectural style and is an extension of the old main building. For example, the arched windows, arches, lobby, corridors, etc. all pay tribute to the old main building. The new main building has five floors, and the main entrance hall inside is designed with a four-story cantilevered design, which provides ample light.

=== Social Science Library ===
The library was designed by Japanese architect Toyo Ito. The open-shelf reading room on the first floor is the essence of the design. The tree-like column structure roof is interspersed with skylights of various shapes, creating a forest of knowledge.

== See also ==
- National Taiwan University
- Peking University Library
- National Central Library
