= Cheung Wing-in =

Hong Kong solicitor, educator and politician

Cheung Wing-in, JP (Chinese: 張永賢; 1920 – 10 September 2010) was a Hong Kong solicitor, educator and politician.

== Biography ==
He was born in Canton, China, in 1920. He graduated from Queen's College, Hong Kong in 1939 and was educated at the University of Hong Kong, studying Literature. In 1953, he obtained the qualification of solicitor in England and opened his own law firm in 1967. He later became notary public and among the first China-appointed attesting officers, He was awarded honorary member of the Law Society of Hong Kong in 2002.

In 1962, Cheung and his sisters and also other University of Hong Kong alumni formed the Cognitio College (Hong Kong) in which he served as chancellor. He was also founding director of the Lung Kong World Federation School in 1977. He was also the honorary adviser of the Queen's College. He was long-time chairman of the Boys' and Girls' Clubs Association of Hong Kong from 1969 to 2000.

He first contested in the 1959 municipal election for the Urban Council of Hong Kong as a candidate of the Hong Kong Civic Association but was not elected. He gained a seat in the 1963 election and served until 1967 when he failed to get re-elected. He had been chairman of the Hong Kong Civic Association and joined the Hong Kong Chinese Reform Association as its legal adviser in 1977 and became its honorary chairman in 1993.

He died at the Hong Kong Sanatorium and Hospital on 10 September 2010.

Political offices
Preceded by Ernest Charles Wong	Member of the Urban Council; 1963–1967	Succeeded by Woo Po-shing
