= Mary Wong Wing-cheung =

Hong Kong social worker and politician

Mary Wong Wing-cheung MBE JP
- 王永祥夫人

Unofficial Member of the Legislative Council of Hong Kong
- In office 15 November 1972 - 19 October 1973

Chairman of the Hong Kong Council of Social Service
- In office 1970

Vice Chairman of the Hong Kong Council of Social Service
- In office 1969

Personal details
- Born: Shek Shun-kit; 22 October 1920; British Hong Kong
- Died: 19 March 1973 (aged 52); British Hong Kong
- Education: University of Hong Kong

Mary Wong Wing-cheung (Chinese: 王永祥夫人; 22 October 1920 – 19 March 1973) was a Hong Kong social worker and an unofficial member of the Legislative Council of Hong Kong.

== Biography ==
She was born Shek Shun-kit (石崇傑) in Hong Kong in 22 October 1920, was educated at the St. Paul's College. She graduated from the University of Hong Kong in 1941 with a degree of Bachelor of Arts.

In 1946, she was awarded Member of the Order of the British Empire (MBE) and was appointed Justice of the Peace in July 1972. She had been the vice chairman of the Hong Kong Council of Social Service in 1969 and chairman in 1970 before she was appointed unofficial member of the Legislative Council of Hong Kong in 15 November 1972, becoming the third female to serve on the Legislative Council.

She suddenly fainted during a speech at a meeting of the Hong Kong Council of Social Service on 12 March 1973 and subsequently died at the Queen Mary Hospital on 19 March at the age of 52.
