= Hong Kong Library Association =

Library association founded in 1958

- 香港圖書館協會
- Founded: 1958
- Region served: Hong Kong
- Official language: Chinese, English
- Website: hkla.org

The Hong Kong Library Association (HKLA; Chinese: 香港圖書館協會) is a library association based in Hong Kong for Hong Kong's librarians, information specialists, knowledge professionals and those engaged in library-related work. It was founded in 1958 and also publishes the Journal of Hong Kong Library Association. HKLA was established to further the following objectives: to encourage policies for the promotion of library and information science as well as librarians in Hong Kong and to develop related guidelines and standards. HKLA serves the cause of librarianship in Hong Kong and aims to offer opportunities for professional growth, networking, and community service.

== History ==
The Hong Kong Library Association was founded on 11 September 1958, at the Fung Ping Shan Library of the University of Hong Kong by Dorothea Scott, who was then serving as the university librarian. The founding of HKLA responded directly to the growing post-war demand for organized library services and the need to establish a formal platform for professional collaboration among librarians in Hong Kong.

In 1963, HKLA launched its flagship publication, the Hong Kong Library Association Journal.

HKLA has provided professional development opportunities to librarians and information professionals. In September 1964, HKLA participated in organizing a librarianship certificate course. Throughout the 1980s and 1990s, HKLA expanded its educational reach by partnering with Australian universities to offer joint diploma programs starting in 1987. These programs greatly enhanced local access to accredited library education.

In 2005, the association launched the online Hong Kong Libraries Gateway, a directory of libraries in the region.

More recently, HKLA has embraced digital transformation. In 2011, it digitized an extensive archive of over 40,000 historical photographs related to Hong Kong's library history and commenced the digitization of past journal issues to widen accessibility for members and researchers. In 2020, reflecting ongoing modernization efforts, HKLA introduced electronic membership cards to streamline member services and engagement.

Noteworthy leaders of the HKLA include Dr. Kan Lai-Bing, who served as the Chairman (1961-62, 1970, 1976 and 1982), Mr. H. A. Rydings (1963-66, 1968 and 1972) and Mr. M. Quinn (1974 and 1983-84). HKLA has partnered with the Hong Kong Public Libraries system and the International Federation of Library Associations (IFLA).

== Membership ==
The Hong Kong Library Association offers several different categories of membership, with different privileges and benefits:

- Full Members, of which there are three types, have full voting rights and benefits.
  1. Honorary Fellow (HFHKLA) - Reserved for individuals who have rendered distinguished service to librarianship or information management over their careers.
  2. Fellow (FHKLA) - Requires a minimum of ten years' professional experience alongside significant contributions through council or committee service.
  3. Professional Member (MHKLA) - Open to qualified librarians and information professionals who meet educational and experiential criteria.
- Associate Members, those are employed or actively engaged in the profession but without full qualifications yet; no voting rights.
- Corresponding Members, any persons who having at one time been eligible for personal members, but no longer live in Hong Kong or work in libraries at the moment; no voting rights.
- Student Members, for those currently enrolled in certificate programmes for library assistants, diploma programmes in librarianship or other programmes in librarianship or information studies; no voting rights.
- Institutional Members, which include libraries, societies, corporate bodies or organizations which maintain or are interested in libraries or information services; no voting rights.

== Activities ==
HKLA hosts activities designed to support both professional development and public engagement. HKLA works closely with Hong Kong Public Libraries to provide their annual Hong Kong Library Education & Career Forum, which promotes local study programs and librarianship in Hong Kong.

The association also hosts conferences, workshops and seminars on current topics relevant to library professionals; for instance, the 1968 symposium themed "Library Provision for Science and Technology in Hong Kong", the 1996 conference themed "the gateway to China", the 2008 conference themed "Looking back, moving forward" , and the 2018 workshop themed "Sustainable Development Goals SDGs".

From 2013 - 2016, HKLA provided their Mentoring Programme to connect student and full members of the association.

Collaborative initiatives form an important part of HKLA's work. The association partnered with cultural institutions such as the Goethe-Institut in 2022 to co-host a webinar series exploring digital literacy and intercultural dialogue. Additionally, HKLA organizes study tours for members to visit libraries locally and overseas, including a notable trip to Singapore's libraries in 2016 that facilitated knowledge exchange on innovative library services.

HKLA co-signed IFLA's Public Lending Right statement in 2005, reinforcing support for author rights globally. More recently, HKLA contributed expert advice during Hong Kong government consultations on copyright law reforms in 2020.

=== Publications ===
The Hong Kong Library Association Journal, published continuously since 1963, provides scholarly articles, case studies, and professional insights. Other key publications include the Directory of Special Libraries in Hong Kong (first published in 1983), which catalogues specialized collections across sectors, and the Guide to Hong Kong Medical Libraries (1996), serving health information professionals.

=== Awards ===
The HKLA recognizes excellence within its community through awards that support students and practitioners. The Heleni Linton Bursary offers a HK$5,000 grant to students pursuing library studies, while the H.A. Rydings Award honors outstanding graduates in library studies programs. Mid-career professionals are eligible for the biennial award of HK$10,000 recognizing significant contributions to the field.
