= 1955 Hong Kong municipal election =

← 1954	30 March 1955	1956 →

2 (of the 4) elected seats to the Urban Council
- Turnout: 3,650
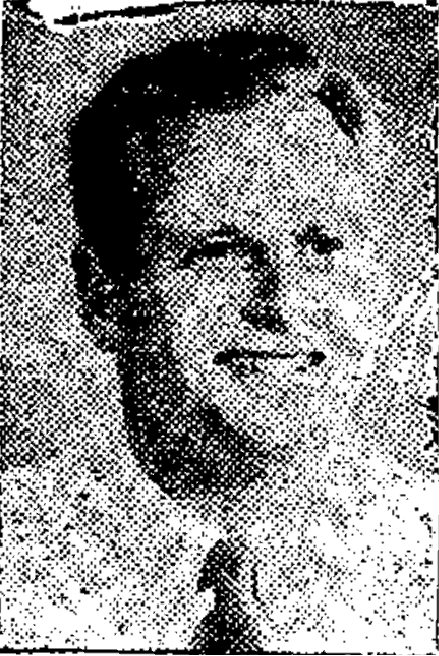
	First party
Leader	Brook Bernacchi
Party	Reform
Seats before	4
Seats after	4
Seat change	Steady
Popular vote	3,283
Percentage	89.62%
Swing	▲9.98pp

The 1955 Hong Kong Urban Council election was held on 30 March 1955 for two of the four elected seats of the Urban Council of Hong Kong. It was the fourth Urban Council election in the post-war period.

The turnout was low compared to the previous year, as only 3,650 voters cast their votes; 1,540 ballots from Hong Kong Island and 374 from Kowloon. Brook Bernacchi and Woo Pak-chuen of the Reform Club were reelected. G.O. Jones, who ran against the Reform Club for the third time, was defeated.

== Outcome of election ==
Urban Council Election 1955
Party	Candidate	Votes	%	±%
Reform	Woo Pak-chuen	1,659	45.35	+25.83
Reform	Brook Bernacchi	1,624	44.27	+20.80
Independent	G. O. Jones	375	10.25	6.24
Turnout		3,650		
