= Hong Kong Council of Social Service =

Organization

The Hong Kong Council of Social Service
- Formation: 1947
- Type: Non-governmental organisation
- Headquarters: Wan Chai, Hong Kong
- Members: 370
- Leader: Ms. Christine M. S. FANG
- Website: hkcss.org.hk

Hong Kong Council of Social Service
- Traditional Chinese: 香港社會服務聯會
- Simplified Chinese: 香港社会服务联会
Transcriptions
Standard Mandarin
- Hanyu Pinyin: Xiānggǎng Shèhuìfúwù Liánhuì
Yue: Cantonese
- Jyutping: hoeng1 gong2 se5 wui6*2 fuk6 mou6 lyun4 wui6*2

HKCSS
- Traditional Chinese: 社聯
- Simplified Chinese: 社联
Transcriptions
Standard Mandarin
- Hanyu Pinyin: Shèlián
Yue: Cantonese
- Jyutping: se5 lyun4

The Hong Kong Council of Social Service (HKCSS; Chinese: 香港社會服務聯會 or 社聯) is a council coordinating NGOs in the social service field in Hong Kong, established in 1947. The Hong Kong Council of Social Service represent more than 480 Agency Members that provide social services through their 3,000 operating units in Hong Kong.

== History ==
In 1951 it became a statutory body. There are more than 370 institutional members, and more than 3,000 service units providing social welfare service to over 90% of the Hong Kong population.

- HKCSS was established in 1947 to co-ordinate refugee relief work.

== Scope of work ==
HKCSS has 2 major types of services: "Member service and Professional Aid" and "Social Service". Member service and Professional Aid is divided into 5 different sectors of work: Sector Development & Partnership, Service Development, Quality Management & Efficiency Enhancement, Policy Research & Advocacy and International & Regional Networking. Social Service is divided into four categories: Children & Youth, Elderly, Family and Communities and Rehabilitation.

=== Family and communities ===
- Development of services, including family, community development, new arrivals, ethnic minorities and substance abuse
- It now has 134 registered member agencies.

=== Rehabilitation ===
- Promote the coordination and improvement of services and facilities for persons with disabilities
- Participate in policy review and formulation
- Conduct public education
- Develop new rehabilitation programs

== Core business ==
It is a part describing the core businesses of HKCSS in details. Some of them are already mentioned in 'Scope of Work'. There are totally six different types of core businesses, including Sector development and partnership, Service Development, Policy research and advocacy, International and regional networking, Information Technology Service Centre and HKCSS-HSBC Social Enterprise Business Centre.

=== 2. Service development ===
==== A. Children and youth service ====
It is responsible for development of Children & Youth service.

==== C. Family and community service ====
It is responsible for the development of services, including family, community development, new arrivals, ethnic minorities and substance abuse. It now has 165 registered member agencies. A paper on the existing family and community situation and services is available for download.

==== D. Rehabilitation service ====
The Hong Kong Joint Council for People with Disabilities is the umbrella body of non-governmental organisations for and of persons with disabilities in Hong Kong. It was granted exemption of registration under the Societies Ordinance (cap. 151) in October 1965. The aims of the Joint Council are to promote the coordination and improvement of services and facilities for persons with disabilities, participate in policy review and formulation, conduct public education and develop new rehabilitation programmes. It also plays an important role in the local and international rehabilitation field. As the objectives of the Joint Council are similar to the Hong Kong Council of Social Service (HKCSS), the Joint Council was incorporated into the HKCSS and became the Rehabilitation Division of HKCSS in November 1965. Further to the 2001 organizational review and re-structuring of HKCSS, it has been agreed that such partnership relationship shall be maintained and, from December the same year onward the Management Committee of Joint Council would be equivalent to the Rehabilitation Specialized Committee of HKCSS.

=== 3. Policy research and advocacy ===
It is an aspect to collect data on social development, so as to understand and predict the trend of social development, conduct scientific research on policies which have an influential impact on welfare and social development, advocate for justice and rational public and social policies, maintain regular dialogue with policy makers, monitor the implementation of policies proposed by HKCSS. The events include Civil Service Summit on Urban Renewal, Seminar on Job Creation at District Level, Civic Sidewalk Issue and the Young Policy Analyst Program (YPAP).

=== 4. International and regional networking ===
Major Work of International and Regional Networking International and Regional Networking is one of the core businesses of the Hong Kong Council of Social Service.

=== 5. Information technology service Centre ===
The aims of the Centre include the enhancement of the ICT capacity of NGOs, the exploration, experiments and promotion of ways to deploy ICT in sector and the promotion of digital inclusion and equitable ICT policies in information society. There are six different services provided, which are Products and Services, Workplace IT Skill Training, Web Services, System Development and Consultation Services.

== Partnership ==
The council has initiated cross-sectoral collaboration projects to bring together wisdom, resources and efforts from the business sector, professional groups, policy makers and the Government in areas of service enhancement, NGOs capacity building and benefiting disadvantaged groups.

Caring Company Scheme is one of the major partnership program. Others included co-operation with RTHK, HSBC, tertiary institutions, etc.

Caring Company Logo

== Committees ==
(From 2022-2023 Annual Report)

- Chief executive is Mr. Chua Hoi Wai.
- Business Director
  - Ms. Chan Man Yee, Grace
  - Mr. Lai Kwan Ho, Raymond
  - Mr. Wong Kin Wai, Anthony
  - Ms. Tam Wing Sai, Jessica
