= Herbert John Charles Browne =

Herbert John Charles Browne, OBE, JP (21 December 1923 – 23 July 2015) was a British businessman.

Born on 21 December 1923 in Bangalore, India, Browne spent the majority of his career working for Swire in Japan, Hong Kong and London. He joined the company in 1947, having spent the war years in India. Recruited for his shipping experience, Browne worked in Hong Kong and Japan and in 1964 was appointed chairman, or Taipan, in Hong Kong. This position included chairmanship of some of Swire's key subsidiaries, including Cathay Pacific, HAECO and Swire Pacific. From 1973 - 1984 he was appointed director of the Group holding company John Swire & Sons in London and from 1984 to 1988 he was Deputy Chairman of Lloyd's Register of Shipping.

During his career Browne held many outside directorships and public positions, including director of HSBC and chairman of the Hong Kong Trade Advisory Group. He was an Unofficial Member of the Legislative Council of Hong Kong from 1968 to 1973. During this time he also served periodically as an Unofficial Member of the Executive Council of Hong Kong.

Browne married Veronica Schlee on 11 February 1950 at St John's Cathedral in Hong Kong. They had four children, Laurence, Rollo, Stephen and Marcus. He died on 23 July 2015 in Bramley, England, aged 91.
