= Solomon Rafeek =

British politician in Hong Kong

Member of the Urban Council
- In office 1964–1971

Personal details
- Education: St. Paul's College, Hong Kong
- Awards: British Empire Medal (1956)

Solomon Rafeek, BEM was an elected member of the Urban Council of Hong Kong.

== Biography ==
Rafeek was a graduate of St. Paul's College, Hong Kong. He worked as a sales manager, P. J. Lobo Co., Ltd. He was an Officer-in-Charge of the Demonstration Team of the Civil Aid Service and received British Empire Medal for his civil service in 1956.

Rafeek was first elected to the Urban Council in a by-election on 25 June 1964 when Chan Shu-woon, a former Reform Club councillor was sued by the Club chairman Brook Bernacchi for alleged corruption during the election campaign. Rafeek won a seat by defeating Napoleon Ng who represented the Civic–Reform coalition, the alliance between the Civic Association and Reform Club, the two political groups in the Urban Council to demand for democratic reform from the government. The Reform Club accused some members of the Civic Association had used their influential to back up Rafeek who was already a member of the Association. The Club found this unacceptable within the terms of the Coalition, and became one of the reasons for the coalition being dissolved. Rafeek formally joined the Civic Association in April 1965.

Rafeek stood for re-election in 1971 as an independent but failed to retain his seat. During serving on the Council, he was a member of the Abattoirs & Offensive Trades, Environmental Hygiene, Hawker Management and Markets Select Committees, and was also Chairman of the Cemeteries, Crematoria & Funeral Parlours Select Committee.

Political offices
Preceded by Chan Shu-woon	Member of the Urban Council; 1964–1971	Succeeded by Charles Sin
