= Henry Luk =

Henry Luk Hoi-on (traditional Chinese: 陸海安; simplified Chinese: 陆海安; born ca. 1923) was a Hong Kong journalist and politician. He was the editor of the pro-Kuomintang newspaper Truth Daily and elected member of the Urban Council of Hong Kong.

Luk was the editor of the pro-Kuomintang Chinese-language newspaper Truth Daily. Under his editorship, he hired Ni Kuang as editor, who went on to become a renowned novelist. Luk was known for his staunch anti-communist stance. During the 1967 Leftist riots, he vocally opposed the pro-Communists and was named on the "dead list" by the rioters among Senior Member of the Legislative Council and member of the Executive Council Kan Yuet-keung, Ming Pao chairman Louis Cha and chairman of the Federation of Hong Kong Industries Chung Sze-yuen after Lam Bun, a Commercial Radio talk show host who condemned the leftists was killed by the rioters.

In 1969, Luk became the founding president of the Hong Kong Chinese Press Association. In 1975 he ran in the Urban Council election and was elected with 4,245 votes. Luk had notably campaigned for free democratic elections for the Legislative Council. He did not run for re-election in 1979.

Political offices
New seat	Member of the Urban Council; 1975–1979	Succeeded by Maria Tam
