= Chan Shu-woon =

Chan Shu-woon (25 December 1921 – 30 November 2003) was an educator in China, Hong Kong and the United States.

Chan was the third son of Chen Jitang, Guangdong warlord from 1929 to 1936. During his stay in Hong Kong, he was the principal of Tak Ming College in Kowloon, the school founded by his father. He was also chairman of the school council of the Shou Shan College, member of the school council and professor of the Chu Hai College and member of the school council of the Kwong Tai College. He was also the Chairman and later Life Chairman of the Eastern Athletic Association and Chairman of the Tsung Tsin Association.

He joined the Reform Club of Hong Kong and ran for the Urban Council in the 1956 Urban Council election. Chan later quit the Reform Club in 1962 and ran as an independent in the 1963 Urban Council election. Brook Bernacchi, leader of the Reform Club later on sued Chan for alleged corruption during the election campaign. Chan subsequently resigned from the office in 1964 and departed Hong Kong for the United States on 1 May.

Chan immigrated to the United States and became a professor in a college in the San Francisco Bay area.

Chan had brothers including Chan Shu-jone, Chan Shu-gar and Chan Shu-park.

Political offices
New seat	Member of the Urban Council; 1956–1964	Succeeded by Solomon Rafeek
