= Ernest Charles Wong =

Ernest Charles Wong (Chinese: 王澤流; died in 2004) was a Hong Kong entrepreneur and public figure active in the 1950s and 1960s.

He worked for the Shriro as a manager of the watch department and co-founded the Federation of Hong Kong Watch Trades and Industries and later became its chairman in 1955. He was also director and later chairman of the Tung Wah Group of Hospitals in 1959. Under his spell, he oversaw the reconstruction of the Kwong Wah Hospital, in which his was responsible for fundraising. He had also been vice president of the Chinese Manufacturers' Association of Hong Kong.

In 1959, he was nominated by the Hong Kong Civic Association to run for the Urban Council election. He served for one term and stepped down in 1963.

He was married and had two sons. The younger son of his married to second daughter of Kan Yuet-hing, brother of Sir Kan Yuet-keung.

Political offices
Preceded by Philip Au	Member of the Urban Council; 1959–1963	Succeeded by Cheung Wing-in
