= Li Yiu-bor =

Li Yiu-bor, OBE, JP (22 October 1909 – 6 September 1976) was a Hong Kong teacher, publisher, politician and religious leader.

== Biography ==
Li was born on 22 October 1909 and was educated at the Wah Yan College. He became a teacher at the school in November 1930 and was transferred to the Kowloon branch in April 1931 until his retirement in August 1963. After that, he started the publishing house, Modern Education Research Society Ltd.

He was member of the Hong Kong Teachers' Association and its Chairman. He represented the Hong Kong Civic Association, a political organisation closely tied to the Teachers' Association in the 1956 Urban Council election. He won a seat for the Civic Association and continued to serve until he stepped down in 1969. For his service he was made Justice of the Peace in 1963 and Officer of the Order of the British Empire in 1965.

Li was a devoted Catholic and was an active leader in the Church. He founded the Serra Club of Hong Kong and became its head. He was awarded the P.E.P. in 1963 and C.ST.S. in 1965 for his religious service.

He died on 6 September 1976 and was buried at the St. Raphael's Catholic Cemetery in Cheung Sha Wan.

Political offices
| New seat | Member of the Urban Council; 1956–1969 | Succeeded by Peter Chan |
