= Chinese University of Hong Kong Library =

Academic library of CUHK

The Chinese University of Hong Kong Library 香港中文大學圖書館
- Type: Academic library
- Established: 1963; 63 years ago
- Branches: 8

Collection
- Items collected: Books, Bound Periodicals, Current Printed Serials, Electronic Books, Electronic Journals, Electronic Databases
- Size: 2023-2024; 2,592,841 (physical books); 6,168,047 (electronic books); 281,363 (bound periodicals); 3,252 (current printed serials); 225,082 (electronic journals); 1,469 (electronic databases)

Access and use
- Circulation
- Population served: 1,978,010 (visits to the libraries); 66,290 (registered library users) (2023-2024)
- Members: The Chinese University of Hong Kong

Other information
- Director: Benjamin Meunier
- Employees: 36 (professional staff); 189 (support Staff) (2023-2024)
- Website: www.lib.cuhk.edu.hk

The Chinese University of Hong Kong Library (Chinese: 香港中文大學圖書館) is the system of libraries within The Chinese University of Hong Kong. The system has a total of 8 libraries.

== List of libraries ==
- University Library founded 1965
- New Asia College Library founded 1949
- Chung Chi College Library founded 1951
- United College Library founded 1956
- Medical Library founded 1980 at the local teaching hospital
- Architecture Library founded 1994
- Law Library founded 2004
- Learning Commons (WMY) founded 2012

== Past university librarians ==
Term	Name	Taking office	Leaving office	Citation
1	Dr Alfred Kaiming Chiu	09/1966	17/12/1970	
2	Dr Chi Wang	17/12/1970	12/1972	
3	Dr Kan Lai Bing	12/1972	01/12/1983	
-	Ms Shum	01/12/1983	30/01/1985	
4	Dr Chi Wang	30/01/1985	01/09/1986	
5	Dr David S. Yen	01/09/1986	01/10/1989	
-	Mr Cheng	01/10/1989	01/09/1990	
6	Dr Wu Painan	01/09/1990	10/01/1992	
7	Dr Michael Lee	01/07/1993	07/2000	
8	Dr Colin Storey	16/10/2000	11/2012	
9	Louise Jones	07/01/2013	01/2022	
-	John Bahrij	01/2022	06/04/2023	
10	Benjamin Meunier	06/04/2023	-	

== Branches ==
=== University Library ===
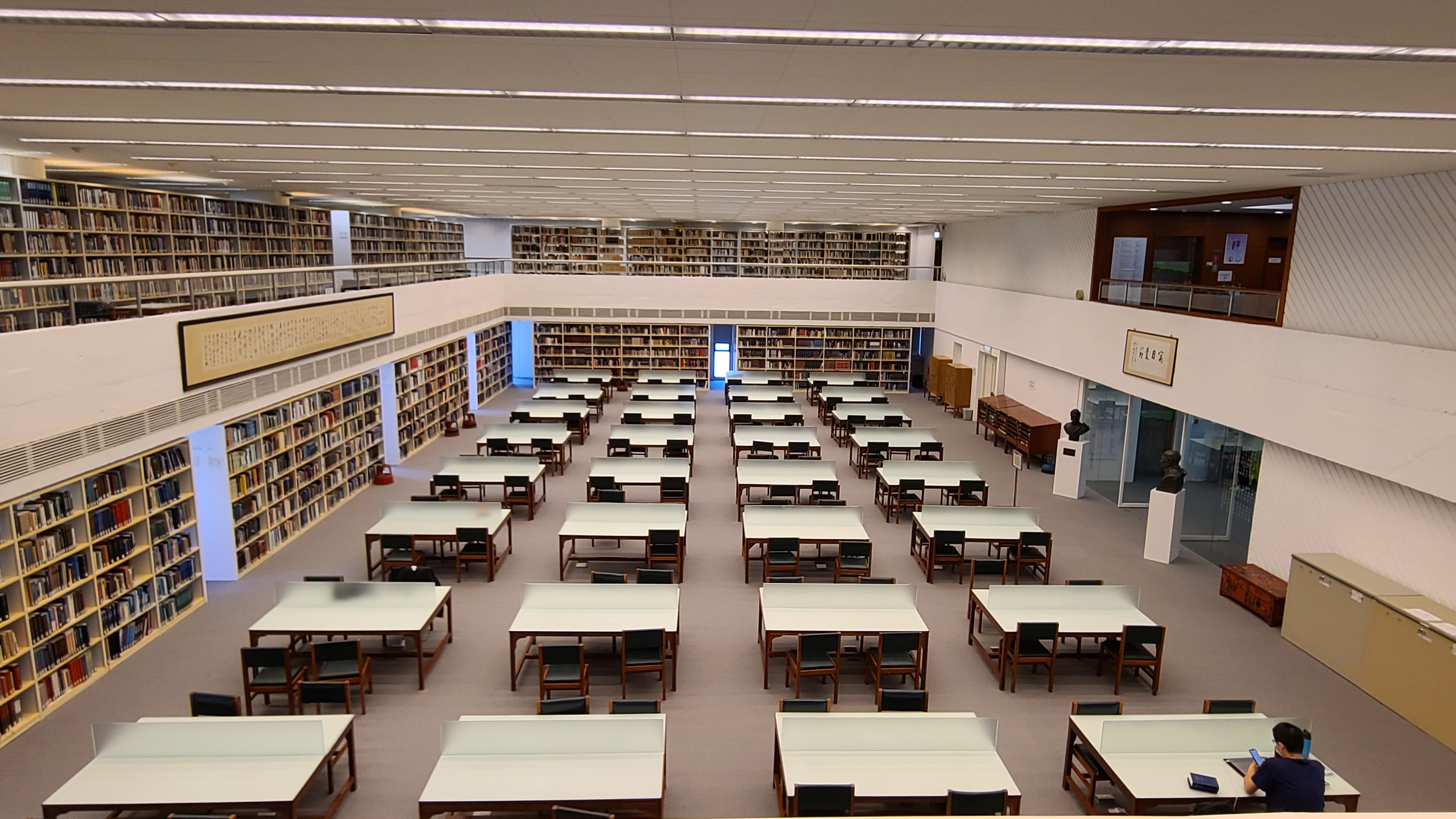
University Library

The University Library is the central library of The Chinese University of Hong Kong, located on the Central Campus. After the establishment of The Chinese University of Hong Kong, the University Library was established in April 1965, initially renting the second floor of the Chong Hing Bank Building in Kowloon for its library and book collection. Subsequently, in September of the same year, librarian Dr Alfred Kaiming Chiu was invited to serve as the first director of the University Library. The following year, the library was moved to the On Lee Building as a temporary site. In August 1969, as the university's campus at Ma Liu Shui began to take shape, the University Library was then relocated to the basement of the Benjamin Franklin Centre as its temporary site on campus. Construction of the current university library officially began in 1970, which was completed and opened on 15 December 1972.

As the Hong Kong government plans to implement the 3-3-4 Scheme, with universities having to take an extra year of undergraduate students of more than of more than 3300 undergraduate students starting from 2012, the university decided to expand campus facilities in 2005, as it was considered that expanding the university library was more desirable than building a new library. To avoid modifying the University Square, the university decided to add a new wing connecting the University Library and the Tin Ka Ping Building, and to build a basement under the Gate of Wisdom as a study space (known as the Learning Garden). In September 2012, the project was completed and the university library was expanded into three parts: the original university library, the new wing research shared space building and the basement study space "Learning Garden".

The Learning Garden became the first library facility of the university to be opened to students and faculty staff 24 hours a day. In 2018, the Learning Garden underwent a renovation project and added a "Library Makerspace" for students to conduct innovative research, including a creative media production room that provides AR and VR equipment, short film and VR production, and a production room equipped with 3D printers, UV printers, laser cutters and other facilities.

=== Chung Chi College Elisabeth Luce Moore Library ===
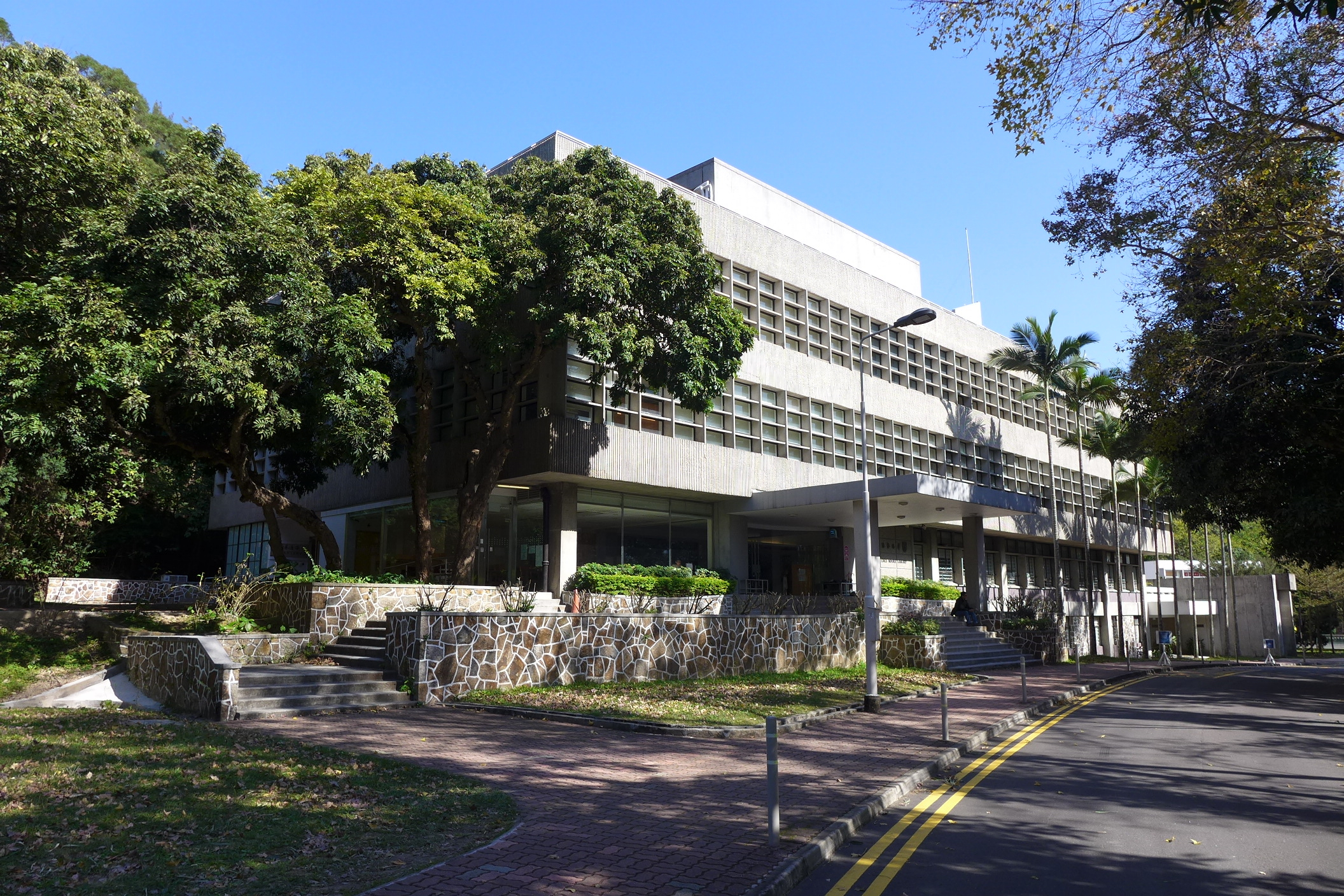
Chung Chi College Elisabeth Luce Moore Library

The Chung Chi College Elisabeth Luce Moore Library was established in 1951. The current building was built by the Henry Luce Foundation through the United Presbyterian Church in the United States of America. It was unveiled on October 29, 1971 by Henry Luce's sister Luce Moor, by Henry Luce’s sister, Elisabeth Luce Moore, after whom the Library was named.

The Chung Chi College Library’s collections focus on music, religion, education, sports science, performing arts and theatre.

=== New Asia College Ch’ien Mu Library ===
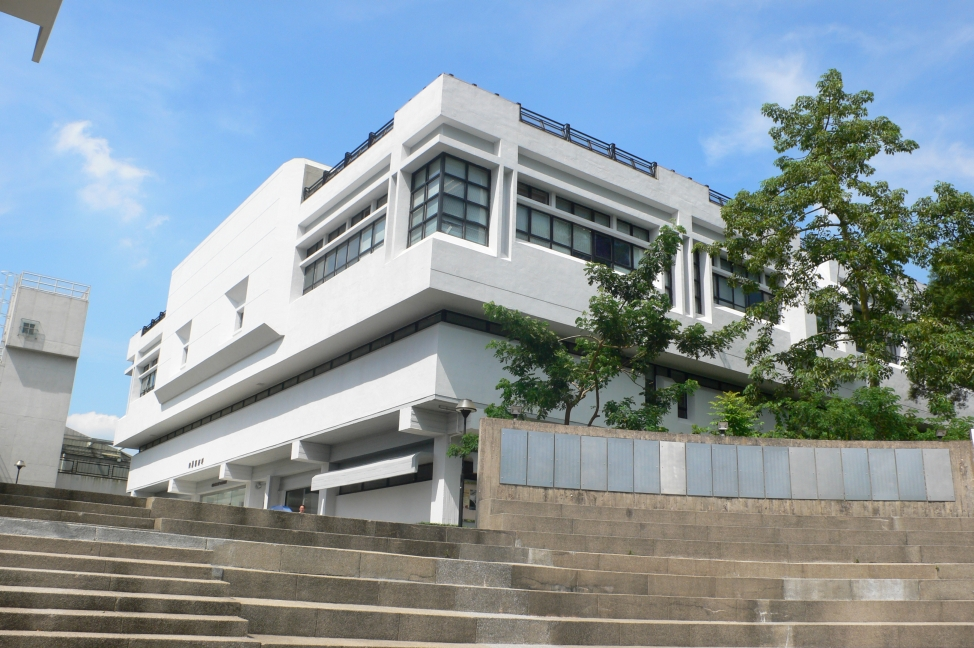
New Asia College Ch’ien Mu Library

The New Asia College Ch’ien Mu Library was first founded on Farm Road, Kowloon in 1954. It was then established in The Chinese University of Hong Kong in 1973 and was named after Professor Ch’ien Mu, the founder of New Asia College. The library was modelled after the library of Berea College, with the building being built with an elevated mezzanine. Another feature of the library is the display of artworks produced by renowned visiting artists as well as teaching staff and students of the Fine Arts Department.

The New Asia College Library houses collections on Chinese Language and Literature, Japanese Language and Literature and Fine Arts. It also supports the research activities as well as the teaching of programmes offered by the Department of Chinese Language and Literature; Department of Japanese Studies and Department of Fine Arts of the University.

=== United College Wu Chung Library ===
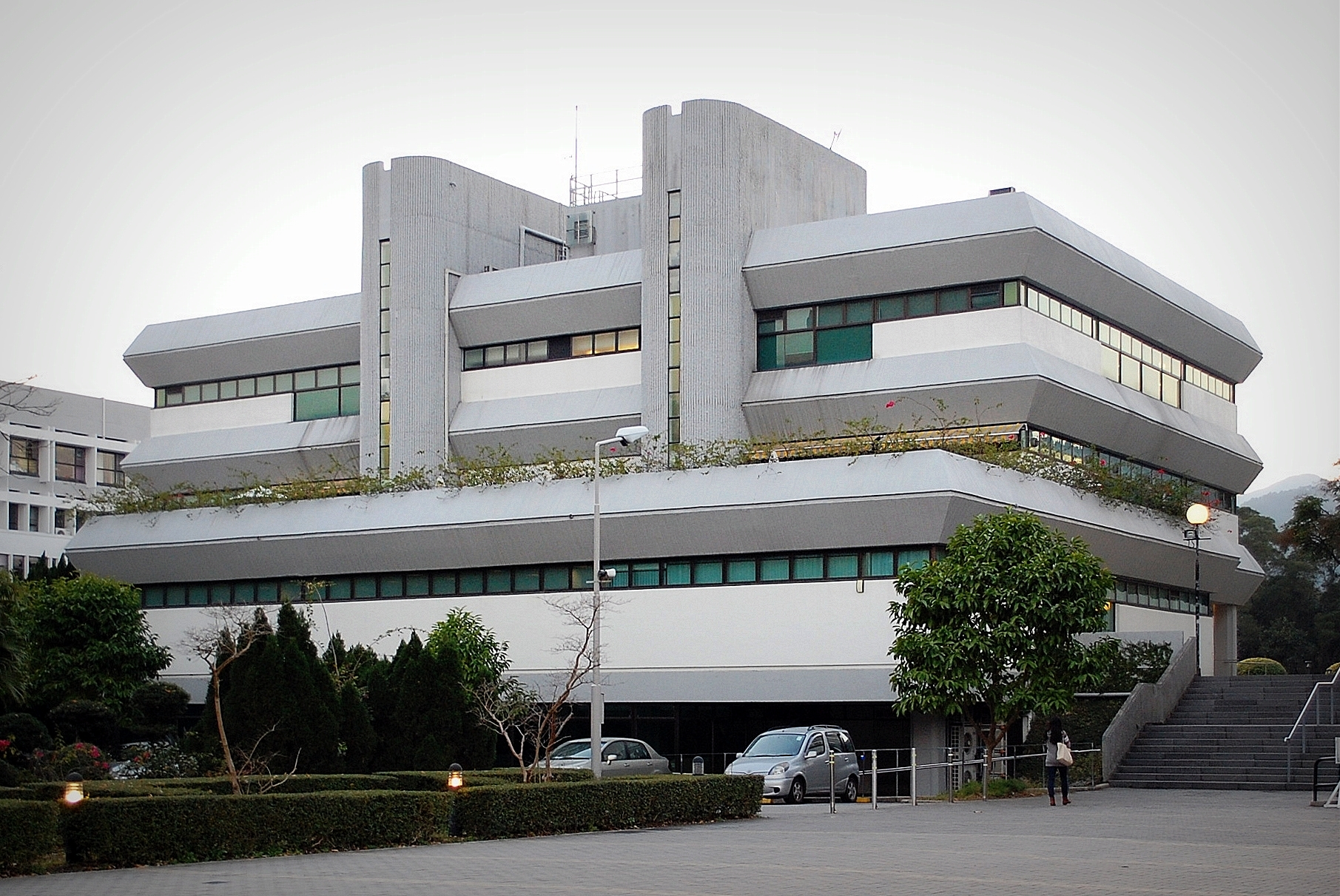
United College Wu Chung Library

The United College Wu Chung Library was established in 1956. The library is named after its donor Wu Chung. The Wu Chung Library was later moved onto the United College campus in 1972 which remains as its present site. In 2001, the Library was re-established as the Wu Chung Multimedia Library. The multimedia collection was later relocated in 2018, which the Library reverted to its original name.

The United College Wu Chung Library is one of the two humanities-based libraries on upper campus of the university. It houses the Philosophy collection, major Chinese monograph series collection, and the General Education collection.

=== Li Ping Medical Library ===
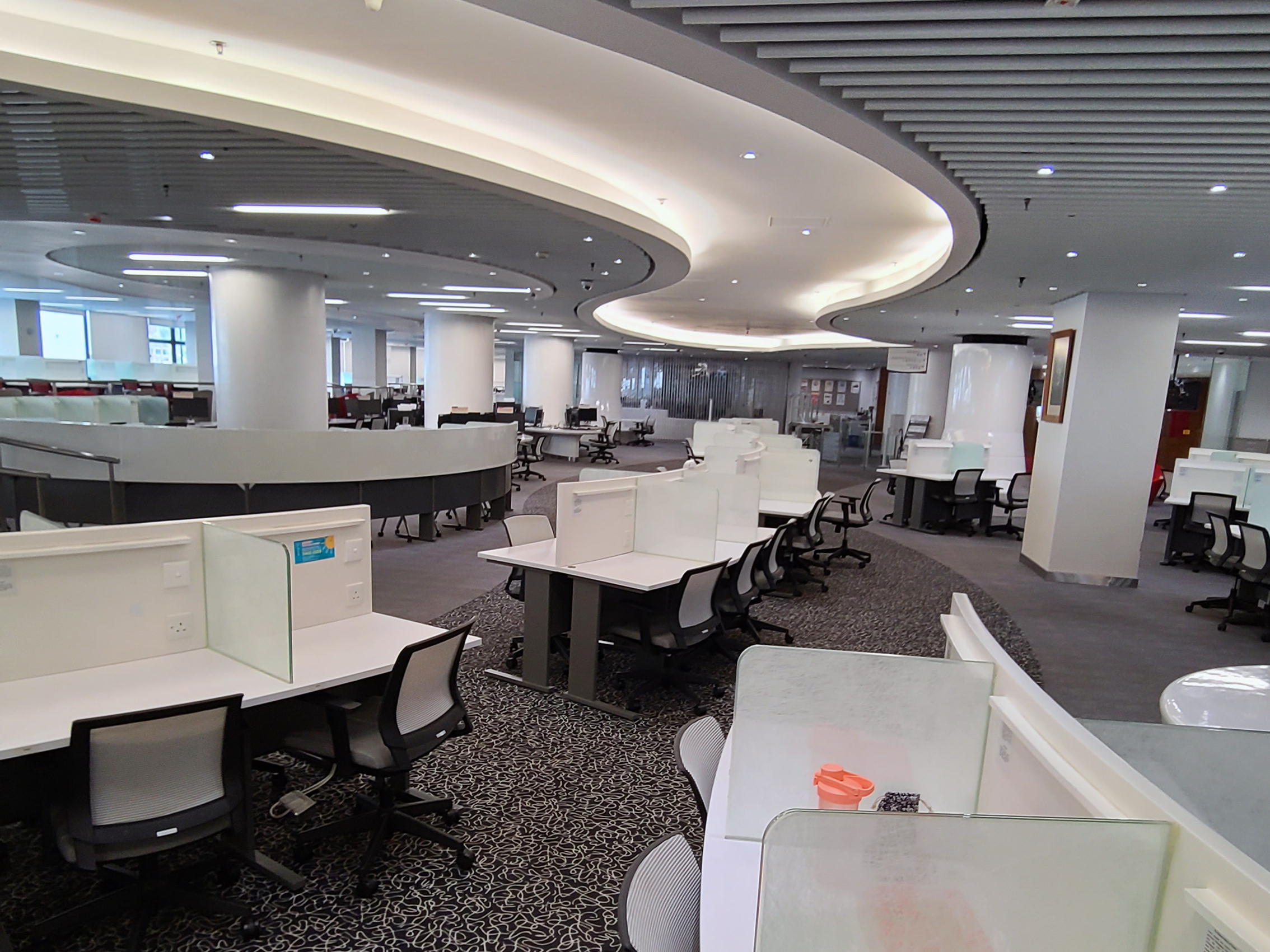
Li Ping Medical Library

The Li Ping Medical Library was established in 1980 a generous donation from Robert Ki-cheong Li, Allan Ho-cheong Li and their brothers. The Library was subsequently named after their father Li Ping.

The library is located at the Lui Che Woo Clinical Sciences Building of the Prince of Wales Hospital, the teaching hospital of the Faculty of Medicine of the university.

=== Architecture Library ===
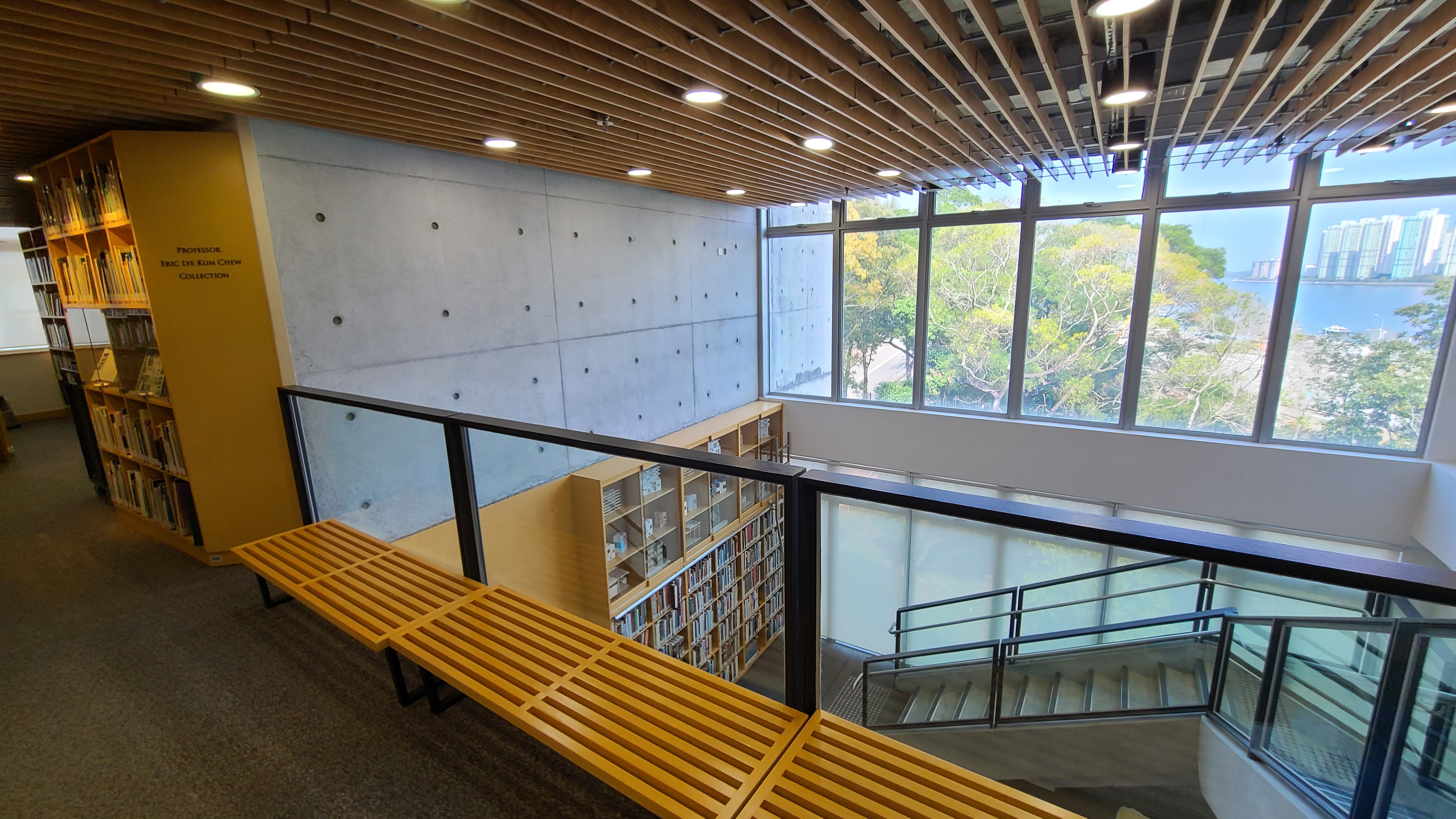
Architecture Library

The Architecture Library was established in 1994. It was later moved to the Lee Shau Kee Architecture Building in September 2012. It is open 24 hours a day 7 days a week. The Architecture Library was established to accommodate the students and faculty of the School of Architecture.

=== Lee Quo Wei Law Library ===
The Lee Quo Wei Law Library consists of books and periodicals on law or law related subjects, which the library is located in the University Library on the 3rd and 4th floors of the Tin Ka Ping Building. It was named after Sir Lee Quo-Wei.
