= Peking University Libraries =

Libraries of Peking University in Beijing, China

- 北京大学图书馆
- Location: Peking University, Beijing, China
- Type: Public
- Established: 1898; 128 years ago

Collection
- Items collected: 10 million volumes (2024)

Other information
- Website: www.lib.pku.edu.cn/en/index.htm

Chinese name
- Simplified Chinese: 北京大学图书馆
- Traditional Chinese: 北京大學圖書館
Transcriptions
Standard Mandarin
- Hanyu Pinyin: Běijīng Dàxué Túshūguǎn

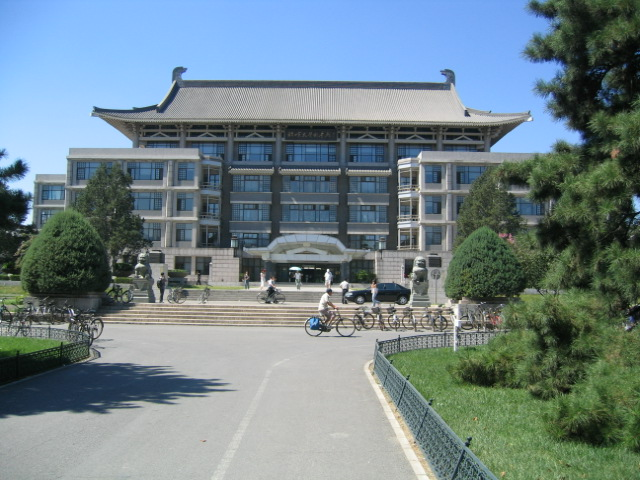
East Gate of the Peking University Main Library building

The Peking University Libraries, or PKU Library, is the library system of Peking University in China. It include the Peking University Main Library, the Peking University Medical Library and various faculty branch libraries. Peking University Main Library is the largest university library in Asia.

== History ==
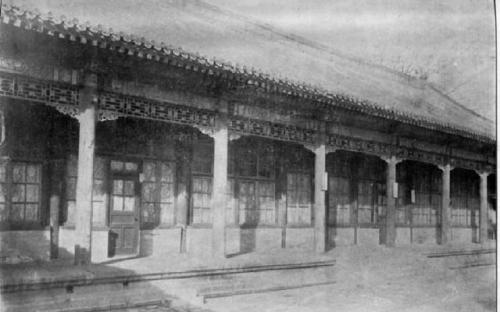
Peking University Library, 1918

In 1898, the Book Collection Building of the Imperial University of Peking was founded on the university campus. It was the first national comprehensive university library in China.

In 1912, after the Xinhai Revolution, the Book Collection Building was officially renamed "Peking University Library", following the renaming of the Imperial University of Peking as "Peking University".

In 1918, the Peking University Library moved into the newly-built Red Building. And Li Dazhao became the Chief Director of the library.

In 1919, Mao Zedong, through the introduction of his mentor Yang Changji, a professor at Peking University, was appointed an assistant at the library. Although Mao audited classes while working at PKU, he was not a formally enrolled student and did not graduate from the university.

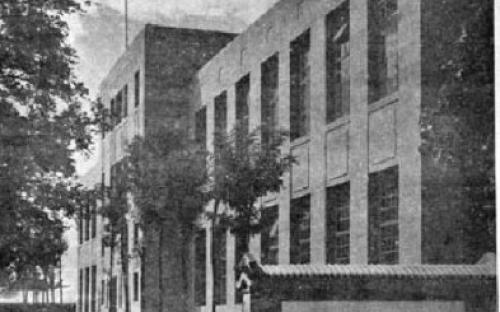
Peking University Library, Facade, 1937

After the Lugou Bridge Incident that took place in 1937, Peking University relocated to Changsha, together with Tsinghua University and Nankai University, united to form the National Changsha Provisional University. And a joint library was set up for the provisional university.

In 1938, the National Changsha Provisional University moved to Kunming, and was renamed the National Southwestern Associated University, with Yuan Tongli appointed as the Library Director.

In 1946, The three universities, including Peking University, were relocated back to their respective original sites. By 1949, the book collection of Peking University Library increased to the second largest in China, right behind the National Library of Peiping.

In 1952, during the national departmental restructuring, Peking University Library relocated with Peking University to the former Yenching University site. The former Yenching University Library's collections were merged into the Peking University Library, and some collections from other institutions were absorbed, forming a structure centered around the former Yenching University Library building.

In 1975, a new library was built in the heart of the campus, becoming China's largest and best-equipped library at the time. Deng Xiaoping inscribed the name of the library.

On May 4, 1998, the 100th anniversary of Peking University, the new library, donated by Hong Kong industrialist Li Ka-shing, opened in the east side of the 1975 library.

In 2000, Peking University merged with Peking Medical University, and the former Peking Medical University Library was renamed the "Peking University Medical Library".

In 2005, the 1975 library underwent a major renovation, integrating the old and new libraries. The new and old libraries spanned over 51,000 square meters, with over 4,000 reading seats and a collection capacity of 6.5 million volumes, making it the largest university library in Asia.

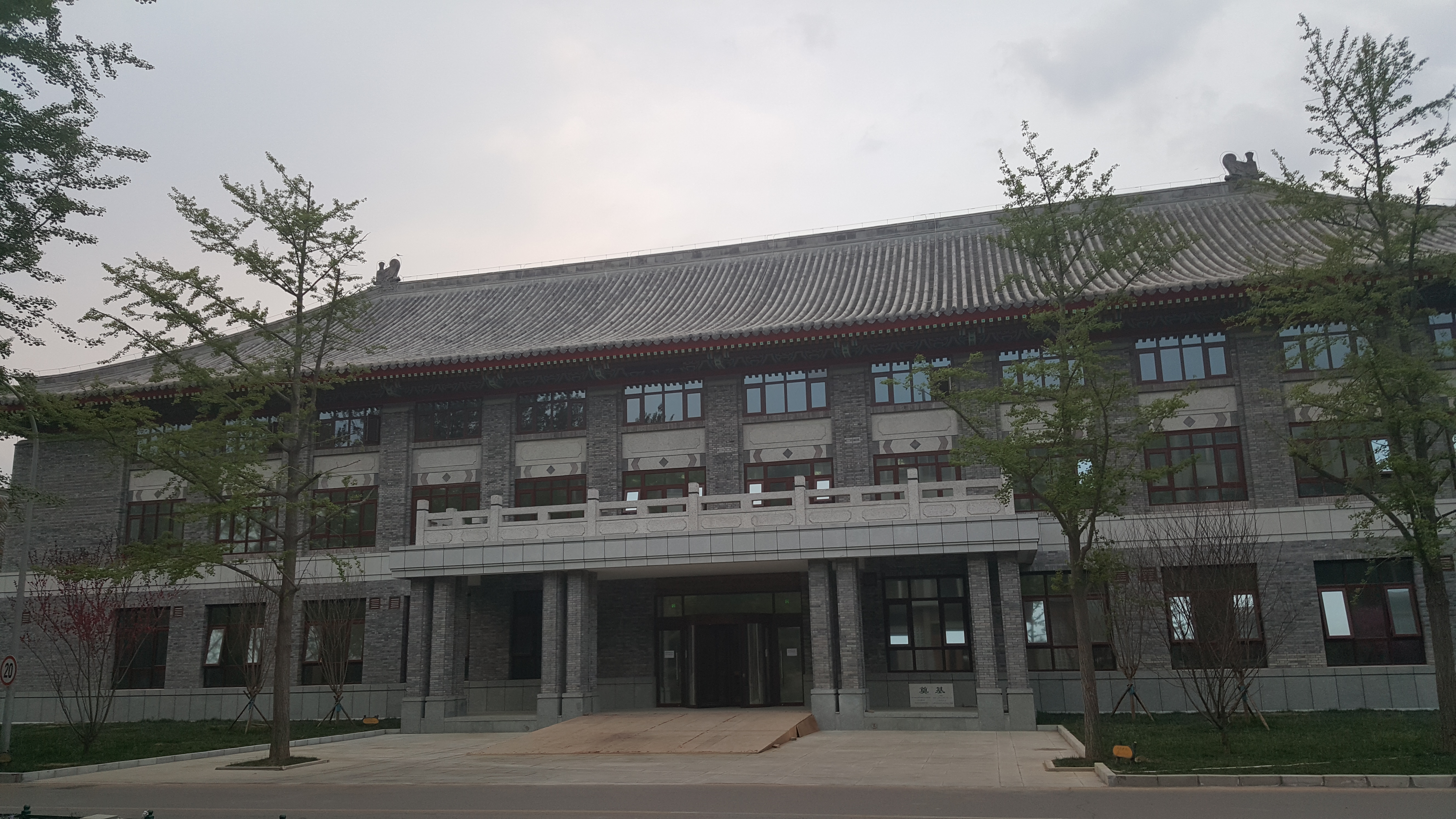
King Abdul Aziz Public Library Peking University Branch

In 2018, King Abdulaziz Public Library Branch in Peking University was established and officially put into operation.

On 28 October 2023, Peking University Library held a ceremony for its 125th anniversary.

== Current situation ==
Peking University Library has developed into a world-class university library composed of the main library, the Medical Library and faculty branches. The libraries cover over 100,000 square meters, and have collected over 10 million pieces of printed documents and over 3PB data storage. The library is a member of the International Federation of Library Associations and Institutions (IFLA), and is a sub-center of the National Digital Preservation Center. The Secretariat of the Steering Committee for Academic Libraries of China under the Ministry of Education and the Secretariat of the Academic Library Society under the Library Society of China are both the Library's affiliated departments.

=== Main library ===
The main library boasts a collection of nearly 8 million volumes, the largest among university libraries in China. It currently houses 4,045 current Chinese periodicals, 3,167 foreign periodicals, over 14,000 full-text Chinese and foreign electronic journals, and 260 CD-ROM and online databases. It holds 1.6 million ancient books, including 170,000 rare books and thousands of precious specimens and editions, ranking third among libraries nationwide. Its collection of rubbings of inscriptions and stone tablets, comprising 24,000 types and 56,000 copies, primarily of stone inscriptions, is among the largest in China and the largest among Chinese universities. The library circulates 1,000,000 items per year.

=== Branches ===
The branch libraries include the Medical Library, the King Abdulaziz Public Library Branch in Peking University (“Library Branch”) and the following:

- School of Mathematical Sciences Branch
- School of Physics Branch
- School of Urban and Environmental Sciences Branch
- School of Earth and Space Sciences Branch
- School of Architecture and Landscape Design Branch
- School of Information Science and Technology Branch
- School of Engineering Branch
- School of Software and Microelectronics Branch
- Department of Chinese Language and Literature Branch
- Department of History Branch
- School of Archaeology and Museology Branch
- Department of Philosophy Branch
- School of Foreign Languages Branch
- School of Arts Branch
- School of Teaching Chinese as a Foreign Language Branch
- School of International Relations Branch
- School of Law Library
- Department of Information Management Branch
- Department of Sociology Branch
- School of Government Branch Library
- School of Marxism Branch Library
- School of Education Branch Library
- School of Journalism and Communication Branch Library
- Physical Education and Research Branch Library
- School of Economics Branch Library
- Guanghua School of Management Branch Library
- Institute of Population Studies Library
- National School of Development Library
- International Center for Mathematics Branch Library
- Yenching Academy Branch Library
- Center for Medieval History Branch Library
- School History Museum Branch Library
- Sinology Branch Library
- Confucian Collection Branch Library
- International Students and Scholars Center Branch Library
- Peking University High School Branch Library
- Medical Library
- First Hospital Branch Library
- People's Hospital Branch Library
- Third Hospital Branch Library
- Stomatological Hospital Branch Library
- Cancer Hospital Branch Library
- Sixth Hospital Branch Library

== See also ==
- Libraries in China
- Tsinghua University Library
- Peking University
