= Philip Au =

Hong Kong politician

- Chinese: 區達年
- Born: April 3, 1916; Hong Kong
- Died: October 27, 1993 (aged 77); California, U.S.
- Resting place: Cemetery in Albany, California, U.S.
- Other name: Philip Dalen Au
- Education: Ching Hua College
- Occupations: Businessman, Politician.
- Spouse: Mary Huang
- Children: 1 (Patrick Au)

Philip Au (Chinese: 區達年, 3 April 1916 – 27 October 1993) was a Hong Kong businessman and politician. He was an elected member of the Urban Council of Hong Kong from 1953 to 1959.

== Early life and education ==
on 3 April 1916, Au was born in Hong Kong. At age 10, Au's father died. Au and his sister, Norma, were home-schooled by his mother. By age 12, his mother also died.

Au was educated at the Ching Hua College.

== Career ==
In 1936, at age 21, Au left Hong Kong and went to Shanghai, China. Au studied business. His career started as a bank clerk at Mercantile Bank of India. His assignments advanced and he eventually became the head of the bank's currency arbitrage section. Due to Japanese occupation in China, it resulted in replacement of many bank personnel, including Au. Au and Mickey Markarov started a bicycle assembly venture. Eventually his business expanded into a tricycle taxi service. In February 1949, Au and his family subsequently returned to Hong Kong. Due to China on becoming a communist country, Au had no opportunity to liquidate or bring along any asset. In Hong Kong, Au started Dalen Export Company and his wife was his secretary. He then gradually started his own trading business, King Merritt & Co., in Hong Kong.

In the 1940s to 1950s, refugees arrived from the mainland China into Hong Kong, causing population growth and the local government struggled to accommodate these new immigrants. With Au's interest in helping refugees, one of his greatest achievements was his central role via Reform Club of Hong Kong in initiating government sponsored construction of multi-storied buildings for refugees. He was an active member of the Reform Club of Hong Kong and ran in the 1953 Urban Council election. He also held various honorary positions in the Colony. By the mid 1950s, as a leader in Urban Council, Au led the planning of the North Point Estate, the first housing project undertaken by the Hong Kong Housing Authority (HKHA). In 1958, as a Senior Selected Councillor of Urban Council, Au showed Prince Philip the housing units of North Point Estate. He was also vice-chairman of the United Nations Association of Hong Kong in 1957. He held his seat on the Urban Council until retired in 1959. In 1959, Au gave up his successful export business and political career in Hong Kong and he and his family immigrated to the United States.

== Personal ==
In 1944, Au married Mary Huang in Shanghai, China. Mary's father was Vladimir Golikoff, a Russian tea merchant. In 1945, Au's son Patrick Au was born in China. In 1959, Au and his family immigrated to the United States. In December 1964, Au was naturalized in the U.S. He resided in California. On 27 October 1993, Au died in California, U.S. He is buried in Albany, California, U.S. After Au's death, his son, Patrick Au, donated most of his personal records, business records, documents and press cuttings related to the Hong Kong Reform Club and photos to the University of Hong Kong Libraries.

Political offices
New seat	Member of the Urban Council; 1953–1959	Succeeded by Ernest Charles Wong
