= Brigant Cassian =

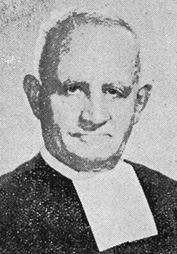

The Reverend Brother Brigant Cassian OBE, FSC (born 1889, Brittany, France – 31 October 1957, Hong Kong) was the priest and education worker in Hong Kong.

He was born in Finistère, Brittany, France in 1889. He was educated in Likes College of the Brothers at Quimper, following by the Junior Novitiate of the Brothers at Nantes in 1900 and completed his senior Novitiate and Scholasticate at Vauxbelets, Quernesey by 1907.

He started his missionary career by going to Singapore and started teaching there in 1908. During the First World War he served in the Infantry at Salonika, Sofia, and Verdun. He was rewarded the Médaille militaire for the military service. After the war he returned to his teaching post in Singapore.

Brother Cassian joined the staff of St. Joseph's College, Hong Kong in 1921. For then he had taught for 11 years until in 1932 he was transferred to the newly opened La Salle College and became the second Principal of the College .

Brother Cassian also participated actively in the public service in Hong Kong. He founded the Hong Kong Teachers' Association and became the President for three years. He was also the co-founder of the Hong Kong Schools Musical Association. In 1954, he helped founding a political organisation Hong Kong Civic Association and became the Chairman of the Association. He also helped founding the United Nations Association of Hong Kong, which later became the political group striving for self-government of Hong Kong.

He died in 1957 of stomach hemorrhage and graved at the St Michael's Catholic Cemetery in Happy Valley, Hong Kong.

In recognition of his service to the public he was honoured by many decorations notably the Order of the British Empire and the Légion d'honneur.
