= Raymond Harry Shoon Lee =

Raymond Harry Shoon Lee (Chinese: 李有璇) (1911 – 21 February 1972) was a Hong Kong politician, doctor and educator. He was elected member of the Urban Council of Hong Kong from 1953 to 1967.

== Early career ==
Lee was educated in Canada and the Medical School at the University of Hong Kong. After he graduated in May 1938 he was hired as the assisting lecturer at the university. He fled to China during the Japanese occupation of Hong Kong and joined the British Army Aid Group as a medic. He was subsequently awarded Member of the Order of the British Empire for his war service.

== Public services ==
Lee returned to Hong Kong after the war and went aboard to the United States and Canada for further education. After his return to Hong Kong in 1948, he became the Chairman of the Hong Kong University Graduates Association, honorary advisor for the otolaryngology at the Queen Mary Hospital and the Kowloon Hospital, member of the British Medical Association and Dental Council of Hong Kong, and lecturer at the University of Hong Kong.

== Urban Councillor ==
In 1953 municipal election, Lee ran with Brook Bernacchi, Woo Pak-chuen and Philip Au successfully gained the four elected seats for the Reform Club of Hong Kong in the Urban Council. He continued to serve on the Urban Council until his retirement in 1967.

Political offices
New seat	Member of the Urban Council; 1953–1967	Succeeded by Denny Huang
