= Woo Pak-foo =

Hong Kong politician

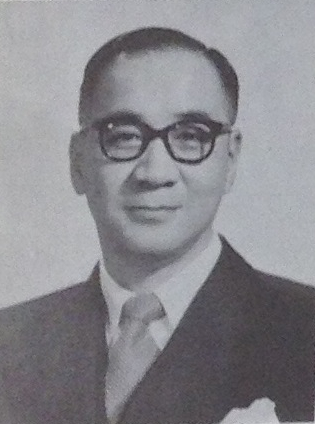
Woo Pak Foo's portrait for the Urban Election poster.

Dr Woo Pak Foo, OBE, JP was the medical participator and member of the Urban Council in Hong Kong between 1956 and 1969. He graduated from the University of Edinburgh with bachelor's degree of Medicine and Surgery and a Licentiate in Midwifery. He got the qualification in 1939 and was entitled to practise on 10 May 1940. In 1956, he represented the Civic Association to run for the Urban Council election. He kept being re-elected until 1969. He received the Order of the British Empire in 1965 for his public service in Hong Kong.
