= 1977 Hong Kong municipal election =

← 1975	3 March 1977	1979 →

6 (of the 12) elected seats to the Urban Council
- Registered: 37,174 ▲9.09%
- Turnout: 7,308 (19.66%) ▼12.34pp
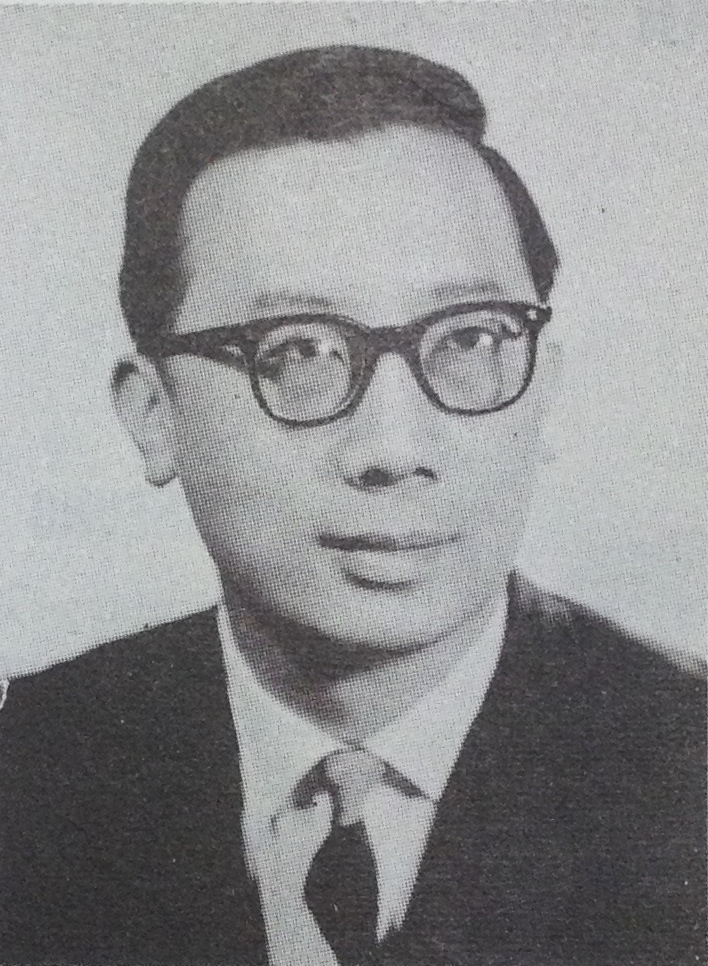
	First party	Second party
Leader	Hilton Cheong-Leen	Brook Bernacchi
Party	Civic	Reform
Seats before	4	3
Seats after	4	3
Seat change	Steady	Steady
Popular vote	15,098	13,249
Percentage	46.78%	41.05%
Chairman before election
A. de O. Sales
Independent
Elected Chairman
A. de O. Sales
Independent

The 1977 Hong Kong Urban Council election was held on 3 March 1977 for the six of the 12 elected seats of the Urban Council of Hong Kong. 7,308 voters cast ballots, 19.7 per cent of the 37,174 registered electorate, about 3,000 less than last election and the lowest turnout in ten years.

The Reform Club of Hong Kong and the Hong Kong Civic Association each put up five and four candidates respectively and there was also one independent candidate Tsin Sai-nin seeking for re-election. All six incumbents were returned out of the 10 candidates with Edmund Chow receiving the most votes, taking over veteran Brook Bernacchi.

== Overview of outcome ==
Urban Council Election 1977
Party	Candidate	Votes	%	±%
Civic	Edmund Chow	4,540	14.07	+4.35
Reform	Brook Bernacchi	4,363	13.52	+0.83
Reform	Henry H. L. Hu	4,060	12.58	−0.12
Civic	Peter C. K. Chan	4,030	12.49	+1.18
Independent	Tsin Sai-nin	3,925	12.16	+2.39
Civic	Ambrose K. C. Choi	3,733	11.56	+1.95
Civic	Wilson W. S. Tuet	2,795	8.66	
Reform	Francis Chaine	2,539	7.87	
Reform	Frederick S. K. Yu	1,184	3.67	
Reform	Tang Man-sit	1,103	3.42	
Turnout		7,308	19.66	−12.34
Registered electors		37,174		+9.09
