= 1973 Hong Kong municipal election =

← 1971	7 March 1973	1975 →

7 (of the 12) elected seats to the Urban Council
- Registered: 31,284 ▼17.21%
- Turnout: 8,675 (27.73%) ▲1.14pp
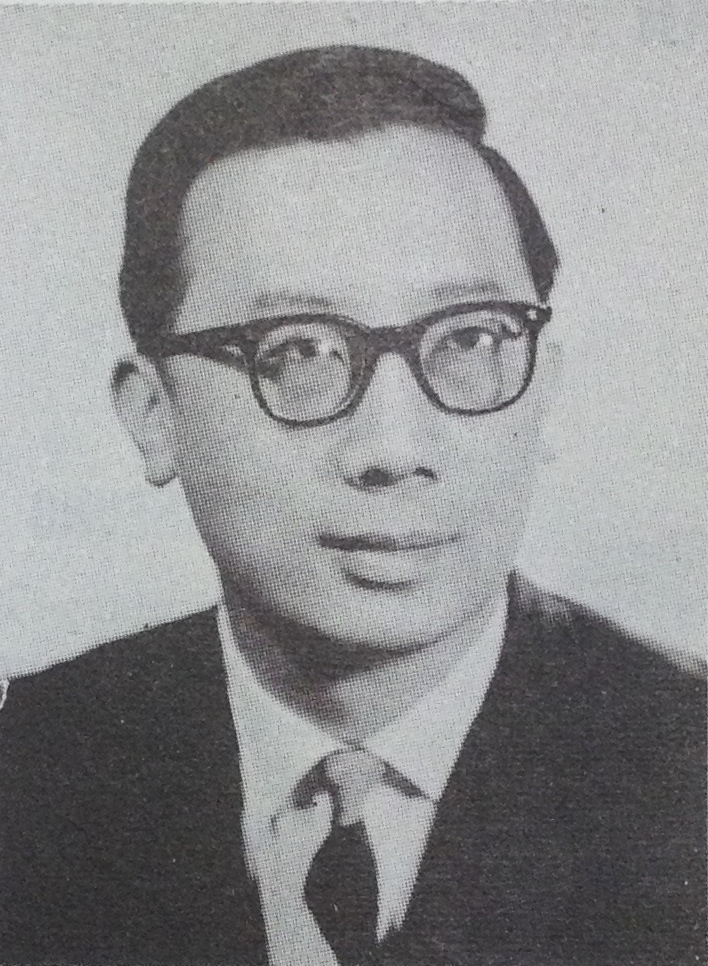
	First party	Second party
Leader	Brook Bernacchi	Hilton Cheong-Leen
Party	Reform	Civic
Seats before	3	5
Seats after	5	5
Seat change	▲2	Steady
Popular vote	25,709	20,912
Percentage	55.14%	44.86%
Swing	▲38.92pp	▲10.48pp
Elected Chairman
A. de O. Sales
Independent

The 1973 Hong Kong Urban Council election was held on 7 March 1973 for the seven of the 12 elected seats of the Urban Council of Hong Kong. Two new elected seats were created in the election. 8,675 eligible voters cast their votes, the turnout rate was 27.64 per cent.

The Reform Club of Hong Kong won four of the seven seats and the Hong Kong Civic Association won the other three. Candidates from the Reform Club, Tsin Sai-nin and Wong Pun-cheuk won the two new seats, with Wong secured the last seat of two-year term, different from the rest of the four-year terms seats. Tsin and Wong would later resign from the Reform Club in 1974, after a fallout with chairman Bernacchi.

== Outcome ==
Urban Council Election 1973
Party	Candidate	Votes	%	±%
Reform	Brook Bernacchi	6,124	13.14	−3.06
Reform	Henry H. L. Hu	5,920	12.70	−1.44
Civic	Peter C. K. Chan	5,274	11.31	−0.90
Reform	Tsin Sai-nin	4,556	9.77	New
Civic	Edmund W. H. Chow	4,533	9.72	New
Civic	Ambrose K. C. Choi	4,482	9.61	New
Reform	Wong Pun-cheuk	4,040	8.67	New
Civic	Sansan T. C. Ching	3,395	7.28	
Civic	Henry S. L. Wong	3,228	6.92	
Reform	Patricia Bernacchi	2,516	5.40	
Reform	Lai Siu-lam	1,443	3.10	
Reform	C. P. Young	1,110	2.38	
Turnout		8,675	27.73	+1.14
Registered electors		31,284		−17.21
