= 1981 Hong Kong municipal election =

← 1979	5 March 1981	1983 →

6 (of the 12) elected seats to the Urban Council
- Registered: 34,381 ▲9.21%
- Turnout: 6,195 (18.02%) ▼21.45pp
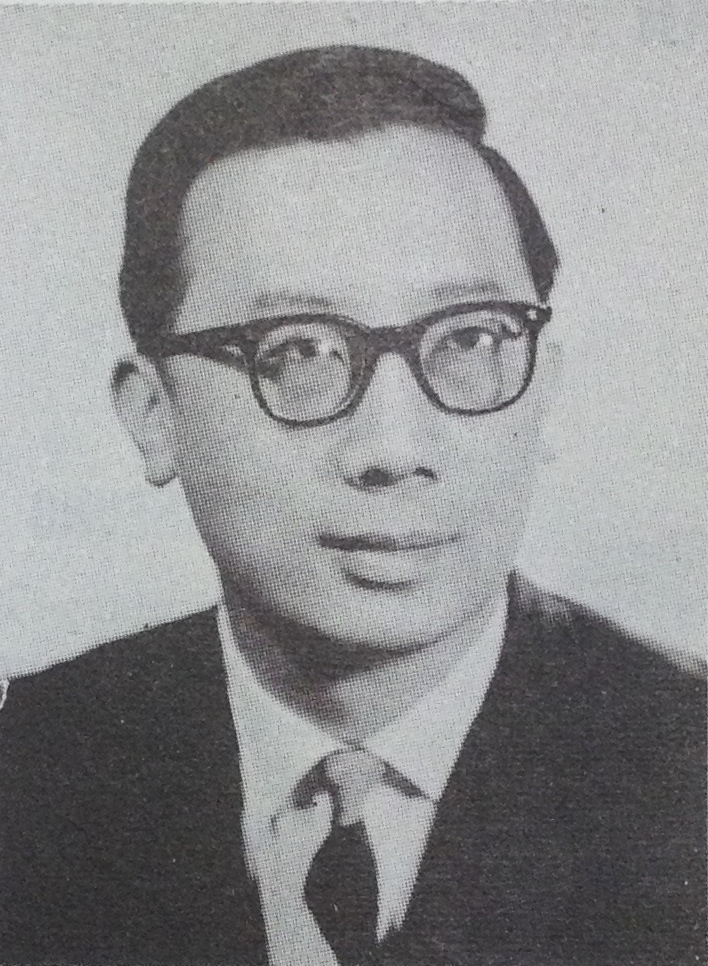
	First party	Second party
Leader	Hilton Cheong-Leen	Brook Bernacchi
Party	Civic	Reform
Seats before	4	3
Seats after	4	2
Seat change	Steady	▼1
Popular vote	11,688	7,291
Percentage	45.35%	28.29%
Chairman before election
A. de O. Sales
Independent
Elected Chairman
Hilton Cheong-Leen
Civic

The 1981 Hong Kong Urban Council election was held on 5 March 1981 for the six of the 12 elected seats of the Urban Council of Hong Kong. Only about 6,195 of the 34,381 voters, cast their ballots in the election, accounting for 18 per cent turnout rate, breaking the record as the lowest turnout rate in history until the 1989 Urban & Regional Council elections.

It was the last Urban Council election with the limited franchise. Before the election, the government announced a major reform of the Urban Council to expand electorate to all Hong Kong permanent residents over 21 in the next year in 1983, which made the term of the elected members in this election only two years.

== Overview of outcome ==
Urban Council Election 1981
Party	Candidate	Votes	%	±%
Civic	Choi Kwok-ching	4,123	16.00	+4.44
Civic	Peter Chan Chi-kwan	3,882	15.06	+2.57
Reform	Francis Chaine	3,750	14.56	+6.69
Civic	Chow Wai-hung	3,683	14.30	+0.23
Independent	Tsin Sai-nin	2,879	11.17	−0.99
Independent	Peter Chan Po-fun	2,781	10.80	New
Reform	Shum Kui-chung	2,434	9.44	
Independent	Cham Po-cheung	1,134	4.40	
Reform	Chan Chan-nam	1,107	4.30	
Turnout		6,195	18.02	−21.45
Registered electors		34,381		+9.21
