= 1971 Hong Kong municipal election =

← 1969	3 March 1971	1973 →

5 (of the 10) elected seats to the Urban Council
- Registered: 37,778 ▲9.85%
- Turnout: 10,047 (26.59%) ▲2.81pp
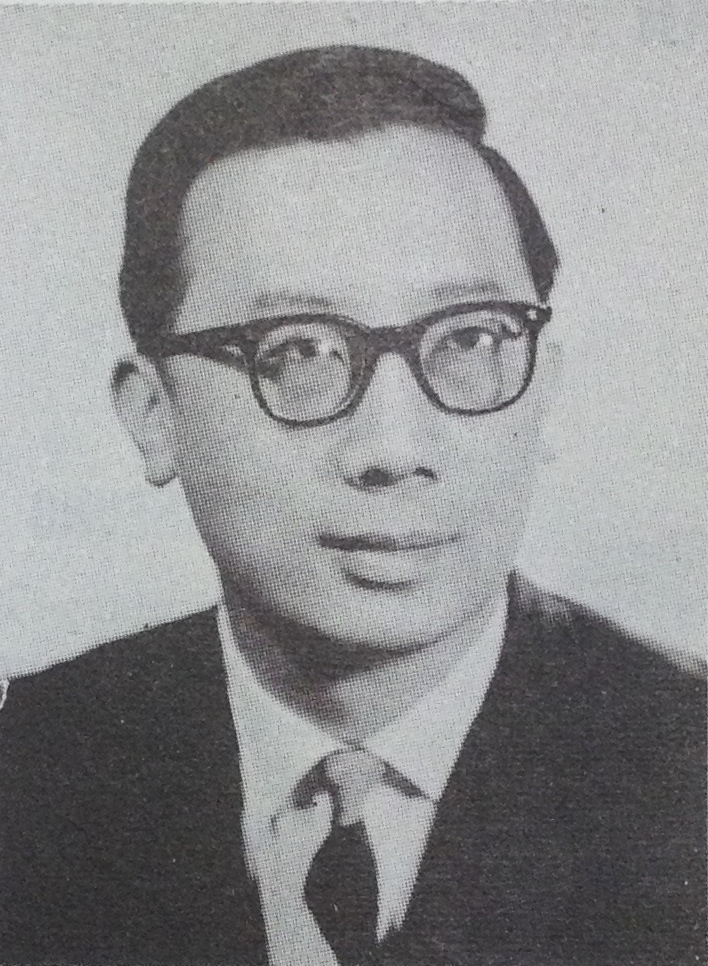
	First party	Second party
Leader	Hilton Cheong-Leen	Brook Bernacchi
Party	Civic	Reform
Seats before	5	3
Seats after	5	3
Seat change	Steady	Steady
Popular vote	13,016	6,139
Percentage	34.38%	16.22%
Swing	▼8.20pp	▼33.00pp

The 1971 Hong Kong Urban Council election was held on 3 March 1971 for the five of the ten elected seats of the Urban Council of Hong Kong. 10,047 of the 37,778 eligible voters cast their votes, the turnout rate was 26.6 per cent, slightly better than the previous election in 1969.

Cecilia Yeung of the Reform Club of Hong Kong won the seat onto the Urban Council, becoming the first Chinese woman ever elected to this Council, edging out incumbent Solomon Rafeek with a margin of 139 votes. Elsie Elliott, who was dubbed as the "Queen of the Polls", led the field of ten candidates with 7,578 votes, topping her 1967 record by more than 500 votes.

== Outcome ==
Urban Council Election 1971
Party	Candidate	Votes	%	±%
Independent	Elsie Elliott	7,578	20.02	+4.69
Civic	Hilton Cheong-Leen	5,790	15.29	+3.89
Independent	Denny M. H. Huang	5,550	14.66	+1.65
Civic	Charles C. C. Sin	3,898	10.30	New
Reform	Cecilia L. Y. Yeung	3,534	9.33	New
Independent	Solomon Rafeek	3,395	8.97	+0.31
Reform	Patrick P. T. Wong	2,605	6.88	
Independent	L. K. Ding	2,182	5.76	
Civic	Edmund W. H. Chow	1,693	4.47	
Civic	George K. F. Li	1,635	4.32	
Turnout		10,047	26.59	+2.81
Registered electors		37,778		+9.85
