= Woo Po-shing =

Hong Kong solicitor, businessman and politician (1929–2025)

Sir Po-shing Woo FCIArb FIMgt FInstD FHKMA
- 胡寶星
- Born: 19 April 1929; British Hong Kong
- Died: 21 November 2025 (aged 96); Happy Valley, Hong Kong
- Occupations: Solicitor, businessman, politician
- Board member of: Sun Hung Kai Properties; Henderson Land Development
- Spouse: Helen Woo (m. 1956)
- Children: 5

Sir Po-shing Woo (Chinese: 胡寶星, 19 April 1929 – 21 November 2025) was a Hong Kong solicitor, businessman, politician and philanthropist.

== Life and career ==
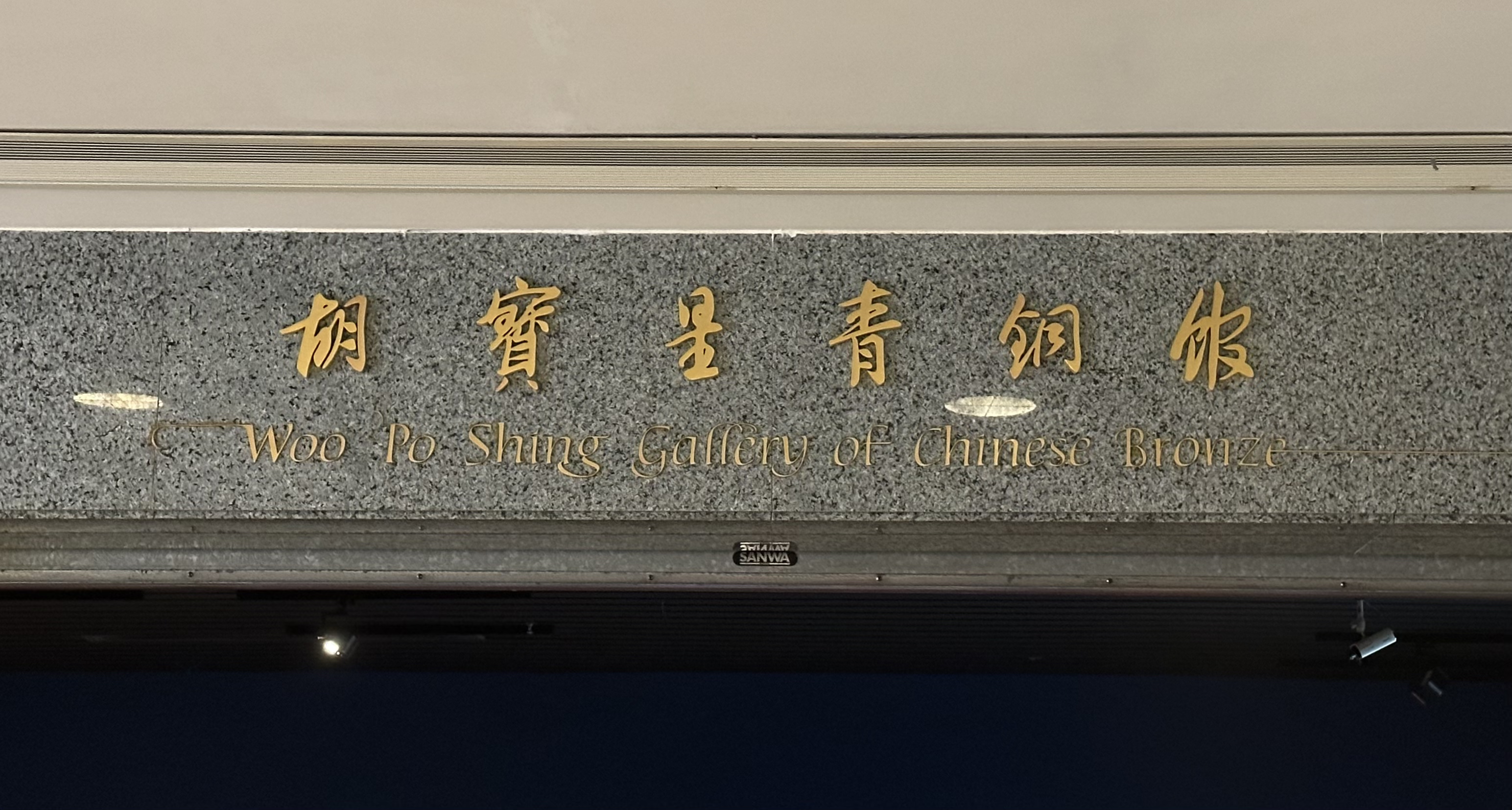
The Gallery of Chinese Bronze at the Shanghai Museum, named after Woo

Woo was born in Hong Kong on 19 April 1929, to a wealthy family of Seaward Woo and Ng Chiu-man. He was educated at the La Salle College and King's College of London. He was admitted to practice as solicitor in England and in Hong Kong in 1960 and became Notary Public in 1966. He founded the Woo Kwan Lee & Lo, Solicitors and Notaries in 1963 and was the consultant of the law firm. In 1983, he was admitted to practice as barrister and solicitor at the Supreme Court of Victoria in Australia. He was also consultant of Jackson Woo & Associates, his son's firm.

Besides his law career, he had been chairman of the Kailey Enterprises Limited and the Kailey Development Limited, director of the major real estate developers in Hong Kong including the Sun Hung Kai Properties and Henderson Land Development from 29 May 1981 to 29 February 2012 and 40 other companies.

He was first elected to the Urban Council of Hong Kong in the 1967 election for the Reform Club of Hong Kong and served until 1971. He was appointed by the government member of the Board of Review Inland Revenue from 1978 to 1981, Staff Provident Fund and Staff Retirement Scheme from 1996 to 2002.

Woo was member of the Institute of Administrative Management and Institute of Trade Mark Agents. He also founded the Woo Po Shing Medal in Law in 1982 and the Woo Po Shing Overseas Summer School Travelling Scholariship in 1983 at the University of Hong Kong to support the students studying the Bachelor of Laws. Among others he also founded the Po-Shing Woo Charitable Foundation since 1994 and Woo Po Shing Professor (Chair) of Chinese and Comparative Law at the City University of Hong Kong in 1995.

He was a member of the Board of Trustees and the Council of the University of Hong Kong, voting member of the Hong Kong Jockey Club, Po Leung Kuk Advisory Board, Tung Wah Group of Hospitals, legal adviser for the Chinese Gold and Silver Exchange Society, honorary president and legal adviser for the South China Athletic Association, patron of Woo Po Shing Gallery of Chinese Bronze at the Shanghai Museum, the Sir Po-Shing Woo Auckland Observatory Building in the Auckland Observatory and honorary professor of the Nankai University in Tianjin. He was also the fellow of the Institute of Management, Institute of Directors, the King's College, London University and Hong Kong Management Association. He received Legum Doctors from the City University of Hong Kong and was part of the world fellowship of the Duke of Edinburgh's Award.

Woo married Helen Woo Fong Shuet-fun in 1956, and they had four sons and one daughter. His hobbies included travelling, antiques collecting including Chinese paintings, bronze and ceramic and he was also a racehorse owner including Hong Kong Derby winners Helene Star and Helene Mascot. He was knighted by the UK government in 1999 and was awarded Chevalier de l'Ordre des Arts et des Lettres by the French government in 2004 for his charitable services to the Arts.

Woo died in Happy Valley, Hong Kong on 21 November 2025, at the age of 96.

Political offices
Preceded by Cheung Wing-in	Member of the Urban Council; 1967–1971	Succeeded by Cecilia Yeung
