= 1979 Hong Kong municipal election =

- 8 March 1979

6 (of the 12) elected seats to the Urban Council
- Registered: 31,481 ▼15.31%
- Turnout: 12,426 (39.47%) ▲19.81pp
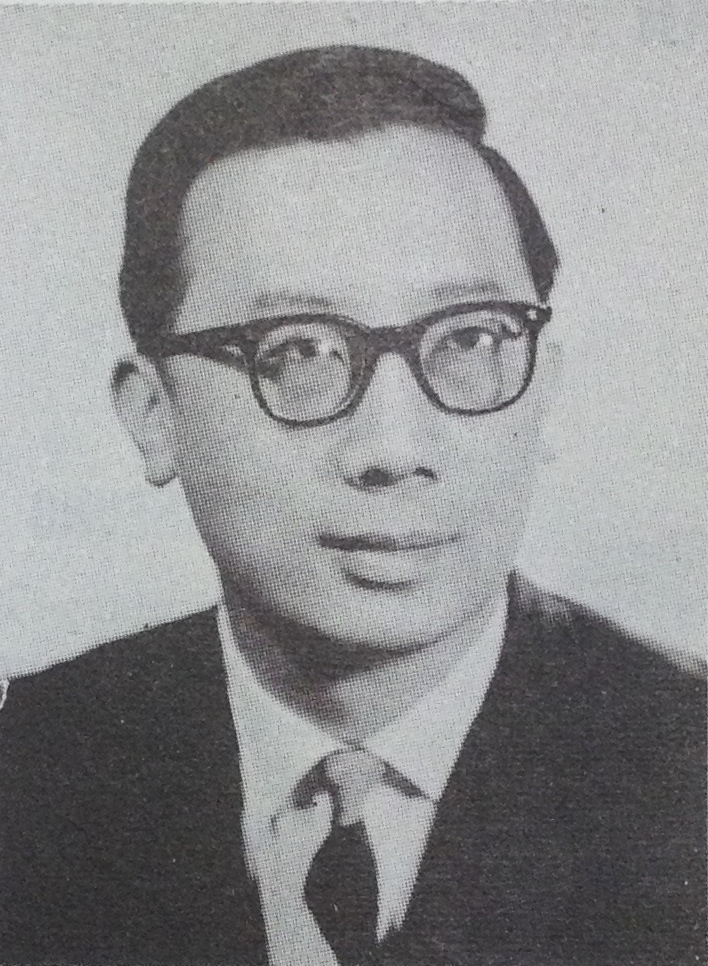
	First party	Second party
Leader	Hilton Cheong-Leen	Brook Bernacchi
Party	Civic	Reform
Seats before	4	3
Seats after	4	3
Seat change	Steady	Steady
Popular vote	9,792	9,579
Percentage	19.09%	18.67%
Chairman before election
A. de O. Sales
Independent
Elected Chairman
A. de O. Sales
Independent

The 1979 Hong Kong Urban Council election was held on 8 March 1979 for the six of the 12 elected seats of the Urban Council of Hong Kong. 12,426 voters cast their ballots in the election, nearly 40 per cent of the 31,481 registered electorate, making it the most participated election before the 1983 reform.

"Queen of the Polls" Elsie Elliott remained the top by receiving more than 8,000 votes, while her running mate Andrew Tu trailing at the 11th place out of 13 candidates and was not elected. Fresh faces Maria Tam and Augustine Chung, who were both lawyers and ran as independents, were first elected to the Council, while Tam soon became a high-flyer and dominated Hong Kong politics for more than forty years.

== Overview of outcome ==
Urban Council Election 1979
Party	Candidate	Votes	%	±%
Independent	Elsie Elliott	8,214	16.01	−1.95
Independent	Denny Huang Mong-hwa	6,348	12.38	−4.49
Independent	Maria Tam Wai-chu	5,488	10.70	New
Reform	Cecilia Yeung Lai-yin	4,990	9.73	+2.36
Civic	Hilton Cheong-Leen	4,743	9.25	−2.86
Independent	Augustine Chung Shai-kit	4,136	8.06	New
Reform	Francis Chaine	3,467	6.76	
Independent	Wong Pun-cheuk	3,335	6.50	−3.27
Civic	Anthony Wong Chi-hung	2,555	4.98	
Civic	Keeson Patrick Shum	2,494	4.91	
Independent	Andrew Tu Hsueh-kwei	2,519	4.91	
Independent	Law Che-keung	1,885	3.67	
Reform	Francis Gilbert Knight	1,122	2.19	
Turnout		12,426	39.47	+19.81
Registered electors		31,481		−15.31
