= 1975 Hong Kong municipal election =

- 5 March 1975

6 (of the 12) elected seats to the Urban Council
- Registered: 34,078 ▲8.93%
- Turnout: 10,903 (32.00%) ▲4.27pp
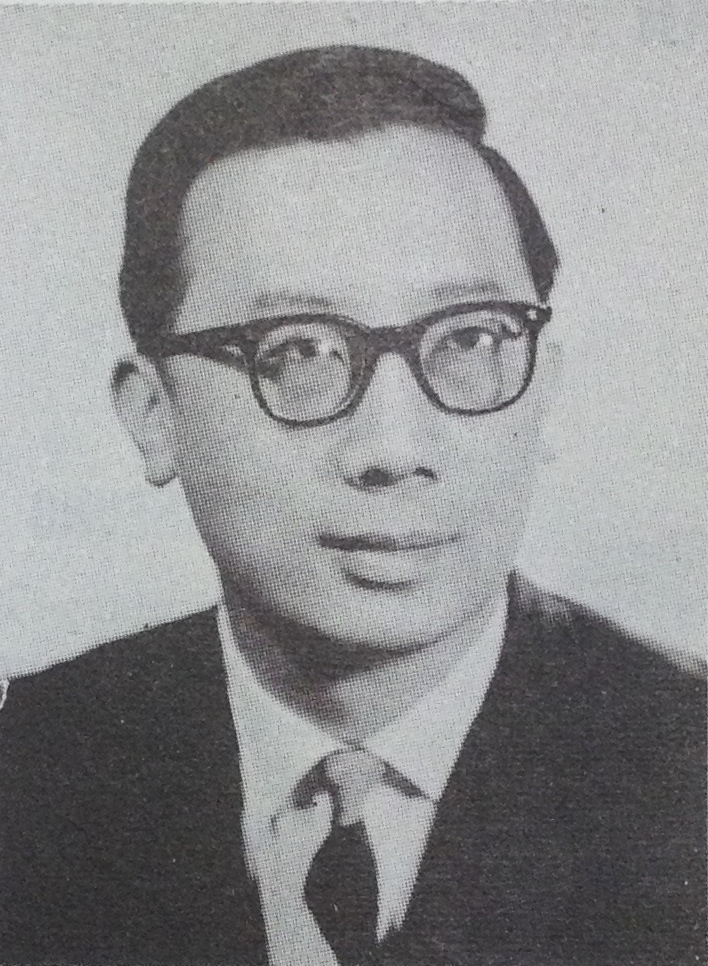
	First party	Second party
Leader	Hilton Cheong-Leen	Brook Bernacchi
Party	Civic	Reform
Seats before	5	3
Seats after	4	3
Seat change	▼1	Steady
Popular vote	15,487	6,141
Percentage	31.30%	12.41%
Swing	▼13.56pp	▼42.73pp
Chairman before election
A. de O. Sales
Independent
Elected Chairman
A. de O. Sales
Independent

The 1975 Hong Kong Urban Council election was held on 5 March 1975 for six of the 12 elected seats of the Urban Council of Hong Kong. 10,903 eligible voters cast their votes, higher than any previous election, though still less than a third of registered voters, less than five per cent of those eligible ratepayers, civil servants, professionals and other professions and a much tinier proportion still of the adult population. For the first time polling stations were set up in the New Territories satellite towns in Tsuen Wan, Yuen Long and Tai Po.

Incumbents Elsie Elliott, Hilton Cheong-Leen, Denny Huang, Wong Pun-cheuk and Cecilia Yeung all retained their seats while Yeung won by a narrow margin. Henry Luk, a 52-year-old outspoken independent, editor of the pro-KMT Chinese-language newspaper Truth Daily, was the only new candidate elected. Luk had notably campaigned for free democratic elections for the Legislative Council.

== Outcome ==
Urban Council Election 1975
Party	Candidate	Votes	%	±%
Independent	Elsie Elliott	8,886	17.96	−2.06
Independent	Denny M. H. Huang	8,346	16.87	+2.21
Civic	Hilton Cheong-Leen	5,992	12.11	−3.18
Independent	Wong Pun-cheuk	4,833	9.77	+1.10
Independent	Henry H. O. Luk	4,245	8.58	New
Reform	Cecilia L. Y. Yeung	3,645	7.37	−1.96
Civic	Hung Sau-nin	3,422	6.92	
Civic	William K. C. Shum	3,258	6.59	
Civic	Wilson W. S. Tuet	2,815	5.69	
Reform	Napoleon C. Y. Ng	1,732	3.50	
Independent	Chiu But-york	1,538	3.11	
Reform	Poon Tai-leung	402	0.81	
Reform	Sung Pui	362	0.73	
Turnout		10,903	32.00	+4.27
Registered electors		34,078		+8.93
