= Tsin Sai-nin =

Tsin Sai-nin (Chinese: 錢世年) was a Hong Kong educator, unionist and politician. He was an elected member of the Urban Council, former president of the Hong Kong Chinese Civil Servants' Association and the founder of the Hong Kong Professional Teachers' Union (HKPTU).

== Biography ==
Tsin was a school teacher, principal of the Jockey Club Government Secondary School and later teacher at the Clementi Secondary School. He was the vice-president of the Hong Kong Teachers' Association in the 1960s. Tsin ran for the 1973 Urban Council election but did not receive support from the Teachers' Association. He turned to the Hong Kong Chinese Civil Servants' Association and later became the president of the Association. Although Tsin was nominated by the Reform Club of Hong Kong during the election, Tsin and Wong Pun-cheuk, another Reform Club candidate, fell out with Club chairman Brook Bernacchi soon after the election, in which the duo resigned from the Club in 1974.

Tsin was involved in the Chinese Language Movement in 1968, which called for an official status of the Chinese language. In 1970, the government announced wage cut of the government school teachers. Tsin organised teachers to form the joint office of the Hong Kong educational organisations in protest against the government's move in which he became the convenor. Tsin also took the leading role in transforming the office was later into the Hong Kong Professional Teachers' Union (HKPTU) in 1973, the most powerful teachers' union in Hong Kong, but resigned from the chairmanship of the preparatory committee in 1973 after being elected to the Urban Council and was replaced by Szeto Wah.

In 1978, he petitioned to Minister of State for Foreign and Commonwealth Affairs Lord Goronwy Robert and British Members of Parliament Frank Hooley on the constitutional reform in Hong Kong with other Urban Councillors Elsie Elliott and Denny Huang, but their request for reform was not met.

In 1981, Tsin founded the Association for Democracy of Hong Kong in response to the government's district administration reform under the Green Paper proposal published in June 1980. In the first reformed Urban Council election in 1983, Tsin lost his seat in the Kowloon City East constituency to local leader Pao Ping-wing, with a margin of 2,603 votes, which ended his ten-year Urban Councillor service. In 1985, Tsin was appointed by the Beijing government to the Hong Kong Basic Law Consultative Committee which responsible for consulting the Drafting Committee on the drafting of the Basic Law of Hong Kong, the mini-constitution of the post-1997 Hong Kong SAR.

Political offices
Preceded by Raymond Kan	Member of the Urban Council; 1973–1983	Succeeded by Pao Ping-wing
