= 1965 Hong Kong municipal election =

| ← 1963 | 3 March 1965 | 1967 → |

6 (of the 10) elected seats to the Urban Council
- Registered: 29,349 ▲13.18%
- Turnout: 6,492 (22.12%) ▲1.60pp
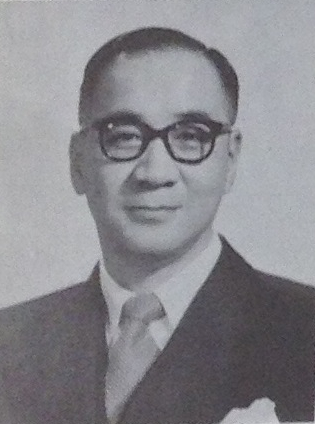
| | First party | Second party |
|---|---|---|
| Leader | Brook Bernacchi | Woo Pak-foo |
| Party | Reform | Civic |
| Seats before | 3 | 5 |
| Seats after | 5 | 5 |
| Seat change | ▲2 | Steady |

The 1965 Hong Kong Urban Council election was held on 3 March 1965 for the six of the ten elected seats of the Urban Council of Hong Kong after the membership of the elected members increased from eight to ten.

As for the previous election, there were four polling stations: City Hall in Central, North Point Government Primary School, Aberdeen Government Primary School, East wing of the Star Ferry Pier in South Kowloon and Queen Elizabeth School. Turnout was 6,492 of 29,349 eligible voters, approximately 22 percent. The Civic–Reform Coalition had collapsed in 1964, but the dominance of the two groups continued separately. Both groups won three seats each in the election, maintaining the balance of power in the Council, with Henry Hu representing Reform Club was elected for the first time.

On election day afternoon, six members of the Labour Party protested peacefully for two hours at Edinburgh Place outside the City Hall poll station with slogans of "Abolish Urban Council", "Support Labour don't vote", and "Give Hong Kong democracy". They criticised the Urban Council as powerless to manage matters that had real impact on Hong Kong residents, and that of Hong Kong's population of nearly four million, fewer than 30,000 people had the right to vote.

== Elected members ==
Urban Council Election 1965
| Party | Candidate | Votes | % | ±% |
|---|---|---|---|---|
| Reform | Brook Bernacchi | 4,192 | | |
| Reform | Alison Bell | 3,913 | | |
| Reform | Henry Hu | 3,828 | | |
| Civic | Li Yiu-bor | 3,768 | | |
| Civic | Woo Pak-foo | 3,616 | | |
| Civic | Hilton Cheong-Leen | 3,520 | | |
| Reform | Charles Ching | | | |
| Civic | Pun Chung-chik | | | |
| Civic | Henry Wong | | | |
| Reform | Patrick Wong | | | |
| Reform | Charles Yeung Siu-cho | | | |
| Turnout | | 6,492 | 22.12 | +1.60 |
| Registered electors | | 29,349 | | +13.18 |
