= Raymond Kan =

Raymond Y. K. Kan (Chinese: 簡日淦; born 1932) is a Hong Kong architect and politician. He served as a member of the Urban Council of Hong Kong representing the Hong Kong Civic Association.

== Biography ==
Kan was born in Hong Kong in 1932 with the family root in Hainan, Guangdong. He was educated in Hong Kong and Australia, graduated from the Pui Ching Middle School and later from the University of Melbourne with a degree in Architecture. He worked at the Public Works Department for three years after returning to Hong Kong, before setting up his own architecture firm .

In 1969, Kan was nominated by the Hong Kong Civic Association to run in the Urban Council election. During his tenure, he served in the committees of the Urban Council and in government-appointed positions. He was also vice-chairman of the Hong Kong Civic Association, president of the Scout Association of Hong Kong in the South Kowloon Region, and vice-president for the Kowloon Region. Additionally, he was secretary and treasurer of the Leo Distrinct 303 of the Lions Clubs International and became president of the Victoria Lion Club from 1969 to 1970. In December 1971, he was appointed to the Commission of Inquiry into the Fire on the Jumbo Floating Restaurant, in which a fire took place on board the vessel 'Jumbo' at Aberdeen Harbour on 30 October 1971, where 34 people died and 42 were injured in the incident.

In March 1972, Kan was elected chairman of the Tung Wah Group of Hospitals, the most powerful charitable organisation in the colony. Before that, he had served as a director and vice-chairman of the institution.

On the 13 May protest organised by the Hong Kong Federation of Students (HKFS) which was not approved by the police, Kan disagreed with the Attorney General Denys Roberts' decision not to charge the student protesters was too tolerant.

Political offices
Preceded by Alison Bell	Member of the Urban Council; 1969–1973	Succeeded by Tsin Sai-nin
Civic offices
Preceded by Philip K. H. Wong	Chairman of the Tung Wah Group of Hospitals; 1972–1973	Succeeded by Charles Lui
