= 1969 Hong Kong municipal election =

← 1967	5 March 1969	1971 →

5 (of the 10) elected seats to the Urban Council
- Registered: 34,392 ▲31.26%
- Turnout: 8,178 (23.78%) ▼14.88pp
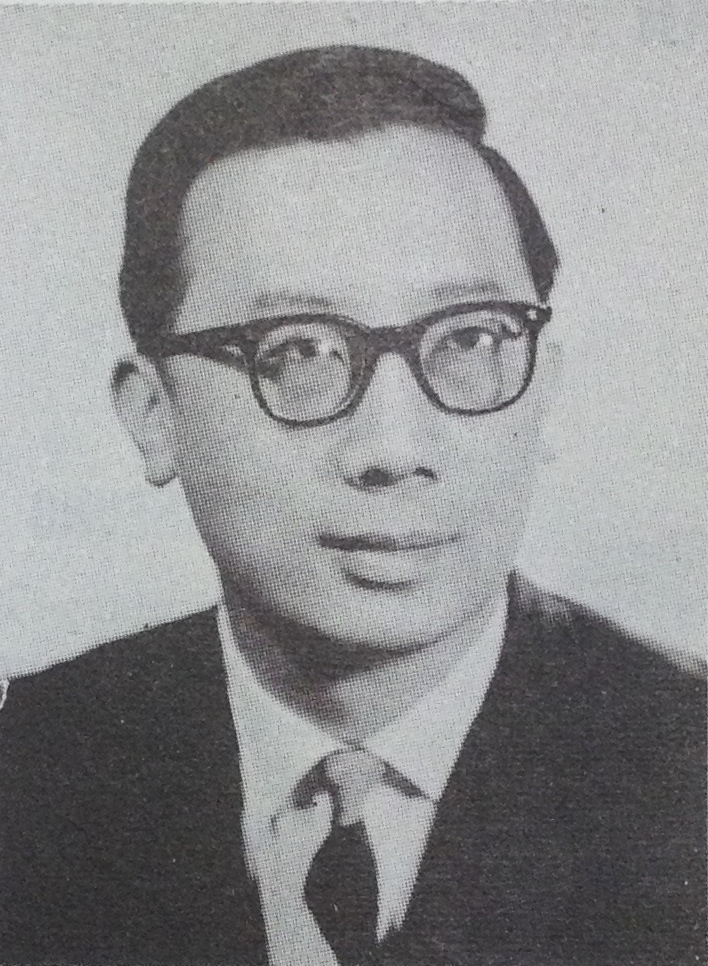
	First party	Second party
Leader	Hilton Cheong-Leen	Brook Bernacchi
Party	Civic	Reform
Seats before	4	4
Seats after	5	3
Seat change	▲1	▼1
Popular vote	14,335	16,571
Percentage	42.58%	49.22%

The 1969 Hong Kong Urban Council election was held on 5 March 1969 for the five of the ten elected seats of the Urban Council of Hong Kong. 8,178 of 34,392 registered voters voted, the turnout rate was 23.8 per cent, a sharp decline from the record breaking turnout in the previous election in 1967.

All five contested seats were divided up by the two political groups, three of them went to the Hong Kong Civic Association while the other two went to the Reform Club of Hong Kong. All three Civic candidates, Raymond Y. K. Kan, Peter C. K. Chan and Henry Wong were newly elected to the Urban Council.

== Outcome ==
Urban Council Election 1969
Party	Candidate	Votes	%	±%
Reform	Brook Bernacchi	5,455	16.20	
Reform	Henry H. L. Hu	4,761	14.14	
Civic	Raymond Y. K. Kan	4,325	12.85	New
Civic	Peter C. K. Chan	4,111	12.21	+6.84
Civic	Henry Wong	3,536	10.50	New
Independent	Y. B. Low	2,752	8.17	+6.75
Reform	Eva Leung	2,553	7.58	
Reform	Patrick Wong	2,459	7.30	+3.27
Civic	Harry Odell	2,373	7.05	
Reform	Alberto Da Cruz	1,343	3.99	
Turnout		8,178	23.78	−14.88
Registered electors		34,392		+31.26
