= Alison Bell (politician) =

Scottish-born Hong Kong doctor and politician (1925–2021)

Alison Bell JP
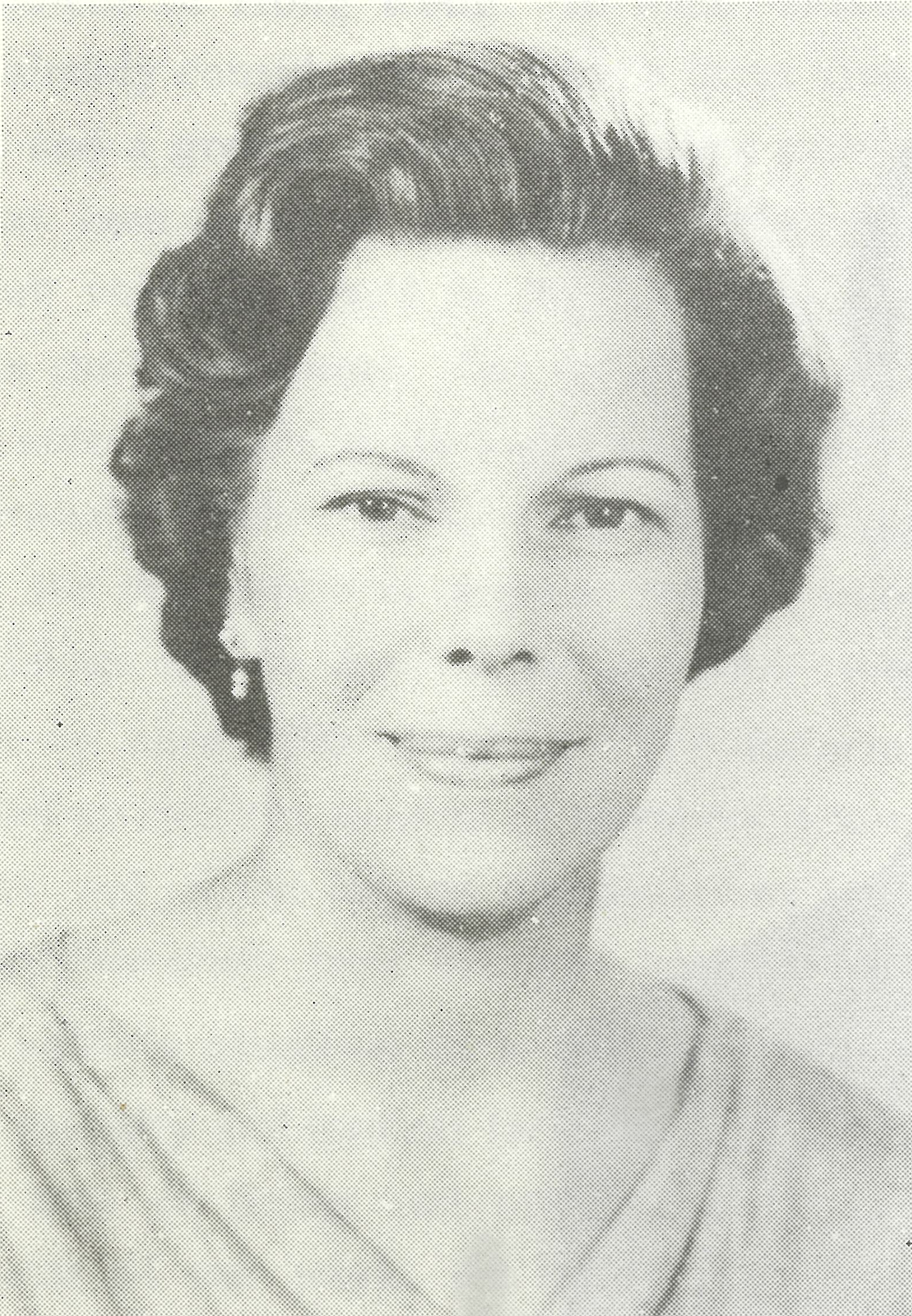
- Bell in circa 1960s

Member of the Urban Council
- In office 1 April 1956 – 31 March 1963
- Preceded by: New seat
- Succeeded by: Elsie Elliott
- In office 1 April 1965 – 31 March 1969
- Preceded by: New seat
- Succeeded by: Raymond Kan

Personal details
- Born: 28 January 1925 Glasgow, Scotland
- Died: 8 April 2021 (aged 96) Canada
- Party: Reform Club of Hong Kong
- Spouse: Peter Hin-tak Fok (m. 1949)
- Education: Rothesay House School; University of Edinburgh
- Occupation: Doctor and politician

Alison Mary Spencer Bell Fok, JP (Chinese: 鍾愛理遜; 28 January 1925 – 8 April 2021) was a Scottish-born Hong Kong doctor and politician. She was the first woman to be elected to the Urban Council of Hong Kong.

== Early life ==
Bell was born in Glasgow, Scotland in January 1925. She was the daughter of John Bell, Senior Partner of James Spencer & Company of Glasgow. She was educated at Rothesay House School, Edinburgh, where she was head girl and captain of games.

== Professional career ==
Bell graduated from the University of Edinburgh with the Bachelor of Medicine and Bachelor of Surgery in 1948. She then took up the post of Canadian Red Cross Memorial Hospital till she married Dr. Peter Hin-tak Fok in 1949. She moved to Hong Kong in 1949. She was an anaesthetist at Kowloon Hospital and after that in private practice until 1951 when she started her private practice.

== Political career ==
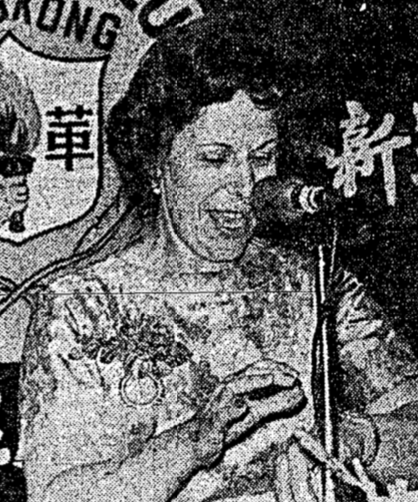
Bell was the vice-chairwoman of the Reform Club

Bell first ran for the Urban Council in the 1956 election as a candidate of Brook Bernacchi's Reform Club of Hong Kong, in which she received 4,122 votes, becoming the first woman to be elected to the council. She was re-elected and served on the council for eight years until she retired from the office in 1963, citing the pressure of work in her profession and household. She returned to politics in 1965 when she ran in the Urban Council election as a Reform candidate again. In 1969, Bell decided not to seek re-election in protest at the lack of executive power of the Urban Council.

During her tenure, she was also member of the Society for the Aid and Rehabilitation of Drug Addicts, Hong Kong Society for Rehabilitation, Medical Committee of the Family Planning Association of Hong Kong, Christ Church Council, vice chairman of the Reform Club. She was appointed unofficial Justice of the Peace in 1964.

== Personal life and death ==
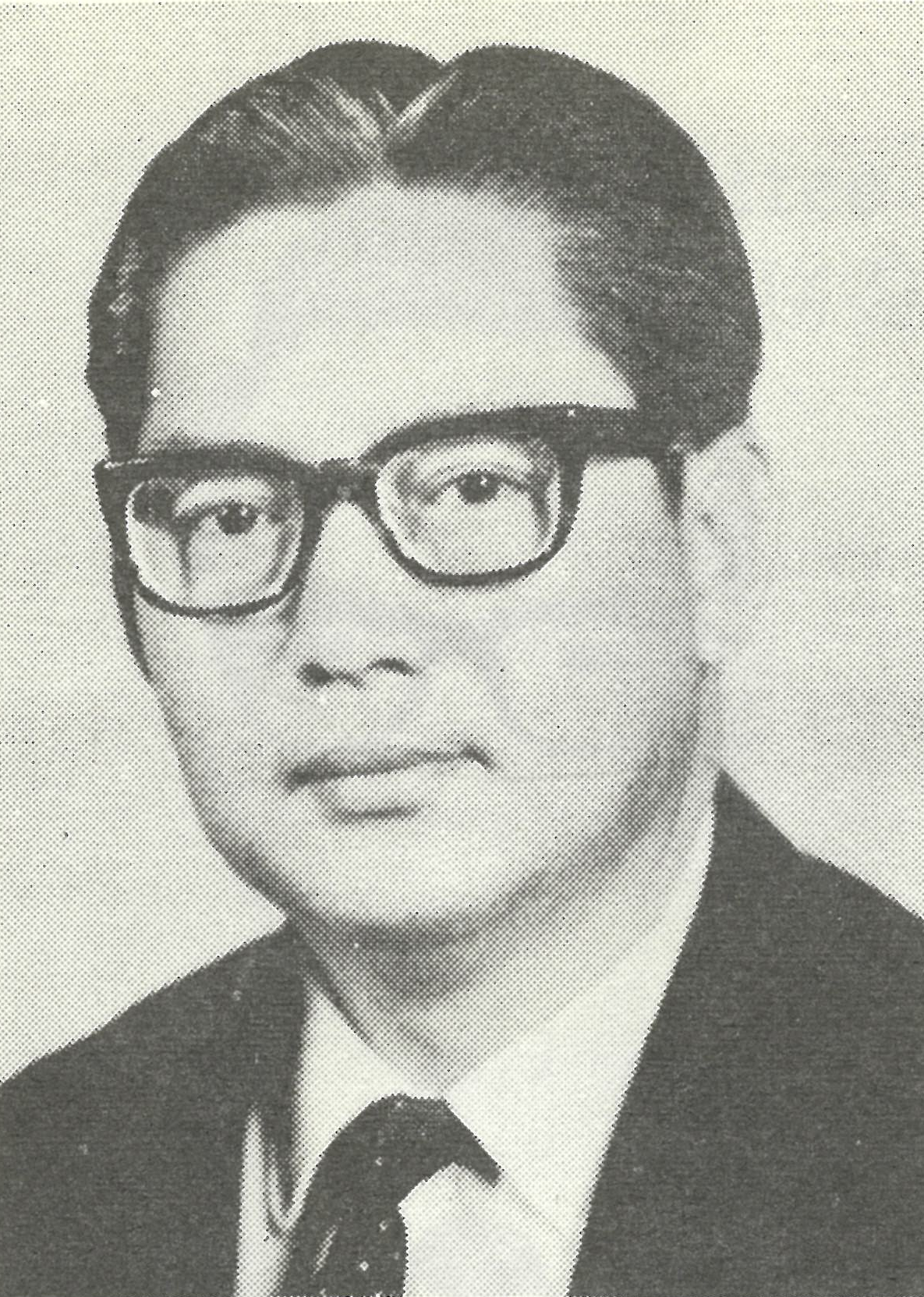
Peter Fok

Bell married Dr. Peter Hin-tak Fok in 1949, son of architect Fok Nai-hang, with whom she had five children. She was able to speak fluent Cantonese. Her son Joseph Fok is a Permanent Judge of the Hong Kong Court of Final Appeal.

She died in Hong Kong on 8 April 2021, at the age of 96.

Political offices
New seat	Member of the Urban Council; 1956–1963	Succeeded by Elsie Elliott
New seat	Member of the Urban Council; 1965–1969	Succeeded by Raymond Kan
