= 1961 Hong Kong municipal election =

- March 1961

4 (of the 8) elected seats to the Urban Council
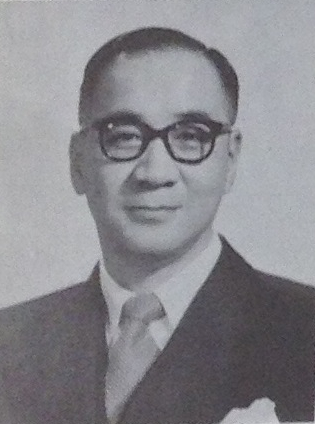
	First party	Second party
Leader	Woo Pak-foo	Brook Bernacchi
Party	Civic	Reform
Seats before	4	4
Seats after	4	4
Seat change	Steady	Steady
Popular vote	Uncontested	Uncontested

The 1961 Hong Kong Urban Council election was supposed to be held in March 1961 for the four of the eight elected seats of the Urban Council of Hong Kong.

In 1960 the two major political groups in the council, the Civic Association and Reform Club formed a four-year coalition for a further constitutional reform in Hong Kong. The Coalition met with the Colonial Office in London however their demands were rejected.

The Civic-Reform Coalition joined the election and no contest was seen that year. The four candidates, Civic's Hilton Cheong-Leen, Li Yiu-bor and Woo Pak-foo of the Civic Association and Reform's Brook Bernacchi were all re-elected.

== Elected members ==
Urban Council Election 1961
Party	Candidate	Votes	%	±%
Reform	Brook Bernacchi	Uncontested		
Civic	Li Yiu-bor	Uncontested		
Civic	Woo Pak-foo	Uncontested		
Civic	Hilton Cheong-Leen	Uncontested		
