= Denny Huang =

Hong Kong doctor and politician

Dr. Denny M. H. Huang
- 黃夢花

Member of the Chinese People's Political Consultative Conference
- In office March 1986 – March 1998
- Chairperson: Deng Yingchao; Li Xiannian; Li Ruihuan

Member of the Urban Council of Hong Kong
- In office 1 July 1967 – 31 March 1986
- Preceded by: Raymond Harry Shoon Lee
- Succeeded by: Kwan Lim-ho

Personal details
- Born: 24 July 1920 Shanghai
- Died: 1 August 2007 (aged 87) Hong Kong
- Spouse: Esther Su-chang Liu
- Education: West China Union College; State University of New York; University of Wales; University of Edinburgh
- Occupation: Doctor politician

Denny Mong-hwa Huang OBE (Chinese: 黃夢花; 24 July 1920 – 1 August 2007) was a Hong Kong doctor and politician. He was elected member of the Urban Council of Hong Kong from 1967 to 1986 and Hong Kong member to the Chinese People's Political Consultative Conference from 1986 to 1998.

== Early life ==
Huang was born in Shanghai on 24 July 1920. He travelled around China when he was young and spoke different dialects such as Mandarin, Cantonese, Shanghainese, Sichuanese and Hunanese. He obtained his Doctor of Medicine from the West China Union College in Chengdu, Sichuan and the State University of New York in 1945. After he returned to China, he assisted Dr. Li Yan'an to establish the Ministry of Health in 1945 when he worked and taught at the Guangzhou Central Hospital. He moved to Hong Kong in 1948 before the Chinese Communists took over the mainland.

== Public career ==
Huang worked for the medical department in the Hong Kong Government for about nine years from 1948 to 1954. At the time when tuberculosis was striking in Hong Kong, he was sent to the United Kingdom to study Tuberculosis Disease Diploma at the University of Wales which funded by the Sino-British Fellowship Trust. When he was in London, Huang represented the Hong Kong Government in the British Commonwealth Health and Tuberculosis Conference. He studied tuberculosis at the University of Edinburgh until he returned to Hong Kong in 1956. He resigned from the government and started his private practice.

Huang was the president of the Chinese Christian Universities Alumni Association and also Yale Club of Hong Kong and became a council member of the Chung Chi College of the Chinese University of Hong Kong. He was also council member of the Hong Kong Chinese Medical Association, member of the Medical Council of Hong Kong and medical advisor to the Hong Kong Teachers' Association. He was also member of the board of governors and the general committee of the Hong Kong Philharmonic Society. With the nominations by the education and church leaders, Huang ran for the Urban Council in the 1967 election. At the time, the Urban Council elections were dominated by the Reform Club and Civic Association, he was able to be elected as an Independent with the second highest votes just after Elsie Elliott, a leading social activist at the time who fought for many issues in the Urban Council with him in the following years.

== Urban Councillor ==
=== Constitutional reforms ===
Huang was an open critic of the colonial rule and government's policies during his service in the Urban Council. He had demanded the government to open elected seats in the Executive and Legislative Councils and expand the power of the Urban Council. In 1968, Elsie Elliott, Hilton Cheong-Leen and Huang threatened to resign from the Urban Council as a protest to the limited power of the council. On 4 June 1969, Urban Councillors Elsie Elliott, Henry Hu and Dr. Denny Huang jointly sent a letter to British newspapers in the United Kingdom, requesting a "wholly local, internal, self-governing administration" and stating that China would "surely tolerate a more sophisticated, egalitarian and enlightened ordering of that society devoted to the interests of the overwhelming Chinese majority of their own compatriots."

In 1976 when Governor Murray MacLehose appointed eight new unofficial members to the Legislative Council, including Henry Hu from the Urban Council. Huang criticised the system as "backward". He argued that the unofficial members had all been members from the vested interests. Although many of the new appointed members were from different sectors but he doubted that their views would be valued as much as the members of the vested interests. Even for Henry Hu who was an elected urban councillor, he was hand-picked by the governor but not elected among other urban councillors, which Huang and other elected Councillors had demanded for years. He denounced the government of using opposition from the Beijing regime as an excuse to refuse creating elected seats. In fact, the government was using the Beijing's unchanged policies towards Hong Kong to reinforce the colonial rule.

After the district boards were created in 1982, Huang also criticised the limited power and budget of the boards. As an ex-officio member of the Yau Ma Tei District Board, He claimed that the district boards were merely advisory bodies. Huang suggested Hong Kong should adopt the model of the Greater London Council, by putting district boards directly under the Urban Council which the district boards would have the power to execute the responsibilities of the Urban Council with a larger budget.

=== Social policies ===
As a medical practitioner in profession, Huang frequently commented on government's health services and policies. He suggested founding a medical school at the Chinese University of Hong Kong in response to the shortage of doctors in Hong Kong. He also urged the government to set up a licentiate examination for the Non-Commonwealth trained medical practitioners.

Huang was the leading figure of the Chinese Language Movements in the 1960s and 70s. He was critical of the discriminatory language policy as English was the only official language in the colony but was not understood by majority of the Hong Kong Chinese residents. When he was the president of the Society for the Promotion of Chinese Education and chairman of the All Hong Kong Working Party to promote Chinese as an Official Language, Huang took 330,000 signatures to No. 10 Downing Street for the recognition of Chinese as an official language in 1971. His demand was finally adopted by the government in 1974. Together with civil organisations such as the Hong Kong Federation of Students, the Hong Kong Chinese Education Promotion Committee co-founded the Joint Committee for Chinese Language Movement in November 1978 to lead the second wave of Chinese Language Movement which aimed at a higher social status for Chinese language and Chinese as medium of instruction at school. Huang urged for mother-tongue teaching in school, Chinese translations of the Hong Kong laws and the training of the Chinese-English translators.

Between 1971 and 1976, Huang was also the chairman of the Environment Hygiene Select Committee and also Keep Hong Kong Clean Campaign Committee, which was launched in 1972 with the aim to generate public concern of environmental cleanliness as the basis of civic pride. However, he resigned from the campaign in 1976, citing increasing government reluctance to provide financial support as it was government's fiscal philosophy of maintaining a small government. When the Hong Kong Housing Authority was established in 1972, the power of public housing managements was transferred to the new body. Huang became the chairman of the operations committee of the Housing Authority.

During his office in the Urban Council, he had proposed some very progressive ideas. He called for legalising prostitution by setting up a red light district miles away from the urban area, which was seen as radical in the conservative society in the 1960s. He believed that by regulating prostitution, it could prevent women in young age entering the industry, fight against the triad activities and also better control the sexually transmitted diseases. He also called for further promotion of sex education to prevent sexual violence, sexually transmitted diseases and contribute to eugenics and healthy marriage life.

Furthermore, Huang agreed legalisation of abortion and homosexuality. In January 1980, a young Scottish Inspector with the Royal Hong Kong Police, John MacLennan, was found shot dead in his police dormitory before he was arrested on charges of homosexual behaviour which raised debates on decriminalisation of homosexuality. Although society was largely opposed to decriminalisation, Huang stated that homosexual behaviours should not be criminal if both the parties were consenting. Legalising homosexuality would prevent blackmailing, although he believed that homosexuality should not be encouraged. Huang was a strong advocate for capital punishment in Hong Kong. After death penalty was suspended in the United Kingdom in 1965, he suggested the Hong Kong Government not to follow the United Kingdom and carried out penalty in Hong Kong for deterrent effect. Homosexuality and capital punishment were not decriminalised and abolished until 1991 and 1993 respectively when the Hong Kong Government aimed at raising awareness of human rights when 1997 was approaching.

On 30 January 1977, Huang organised a public assembly at the Victoria Park against the increase of rates. Thousands of people showed up on that day. Huang demanded cancellation of the unreasonable valuations in 1976 and re-evaluations of the properties. Eventually, Financial Secretary C. P. Haddon-Cave made concessions by setting the limits on the rates increase in his budget in March.

=== 1967 Leftist riots ===
During the Leftist riots of 1967, Huang supported the government to maintain law and order stating that the riots were purely political and threatened the welfare of the Hong Kong residents and labours. However, he expressed his worries to the death penalty sentence to the bombers as suggested by Kan Yuet-keung, unofficial member of the Executive and Legislative Councils. Huang expressed that there were many rioters who planted bombs on the streets were only children who might have been used to do such acts. He was also opposed to Hilton Cheong-Leen's suggestion to publicly hang the convicted rioters.

=== 1977 ICAC amnesty ===
In 1977, the investigations of the newly established Independent Commission Against Corruption (ICAC) into Royal Hong Kong Police provoked discontent within the Police Force. On 28 October 1977, a group of about 40 police officers stormed into the ICAC Operations Department Headquarters in Hutchison House. On 5 November 1977, Governor Murray MacLehose announced a partial amnesty for the offences committed before 1 January 1977. chairHuang expressed his disappointment to the governor's amnesty, stating that although an amnesty was inevitable, the government had undermined governance authority as it was forced to announce the amnesty so hastily under pressure. After the amnesty, the Attorney General John Hobley kept dropping charges against the suspects might also damage the judiciary system. He stated that the ICAC had lost the trust of the people after the incident and urged to chase after the corrupted high officials to clear the ICAC's bad images of evasion and racial prejudice.

=== Running for chairman and retirement ===
In 1981, Huang contested the chairmanship of the Urban Council against Hilton Cheong-Leen after the former chairman A. de O. Sales decided not to run for re-election. Huang failed to win the seat with 7 to 14 votes.

After almost 20 years in the Urban Council, Huang decided not to seek for re-election in the coming Urban Council election in 1986, stating that he was disappointed in the limited power of the Urban Council. He complained that the district-based constituencies which replaced the single territory-wide constituency in the 1983 Urban Council election produced "small councillors" who only cared about their own districts but the interest of whole Hong Kong.

For his longtime services, he was made Justice of the Peace in 1982 and the Officer of the Order of the British Empire in 1986.

== Transfer of sovereignty ==
Huang was one of the earliest leaders in Hong Kong to support the Government of the People's Republic of China to resume the Chinese sovereignty in Hong Kong after 1997. Before the PRC and UK governments began the negotiation over Hong Kong, Huang flew to Beijing to meet with Liao Chengzhi, the then director of the Hong Kong and Macao Affairs Office at the People's Great Hall on 25 October 1981. He was informed by Liao that the Beijing government would resume its sovereignty on Hong Kong as well as the power of administration. Liao also told Huang that the Beijing government would assist Hong Kong to maintain its development, prosperity and stability.

In November 1982 when Huang met with Liao again in Beijing, he proposed making Hong Kong a "free city" with high autonomy for a period of forty years. Furthermore, he proposed the suggestions for the future of Hong Kong including the current laws and industrial and commercial regulations remained unchanged; full elected Executive, Legislative and Urban Councils and District Boards; Chinese Army would not station in Hong Kong and maintain order with only police force; Beijing would not interfere into Hong Kong internal affairs except for defence and diplomacy; Hong Kong legal system remained unchanged and Supreme Court of Hong Kong remained the highest court in the territory; banknotes continued to be issued by the Hongkong and Shanghai Bank and the Standard Chartered Bank; considered leasing the Tamar site to the Royal Navy for supplies and repairs.

On 27 September 1983 when he met with Ji Pengfei, Liao's successor as the director of the Hong Kong and Macao Affairs Office, Huang proposed a constitution for the Hong Kong Special Administrative Region to build confidence of the Hong Kong people and asked for its guarantee of the residents who disagreed with socialism could still have the right to stay, work and the manage Hong Kong affairs. Huang believed that the upholding of rule of law would ease the anxiety of the Hong Kong people. By that he urged the Hong Kong Government to raise the democratic consciousness and increase elected seats in the government.

Huang subsequently accepted an invitation to join the Chinese People's Political Consultative Conference as a Hong Kong member in March 1986 and served until 1998.

== Death and family ==
He died on 1 August 2007. He married Esther So-chang Liu with 5 children and had lived at No. 24 Somerset Road, Kowloon Tong.

Political offices
Preceded by Raymond Harry Shoon Lee	Member of the Urban Council; 1967–1986	Succeeded by Kwan Lim-ho
