= Wong Pun-cheuk =

Wong Pun-cheuk (Chinese: 黃品卓) was a Hong Kong politician. He was an elected member of the Urban Council of Hong Kong.

Born in Sunwui, Guangdong, Wong lived in Hong Kong since his childhood. He was graduated from the University of Hong Kong with a bachelor's degree in medicine. He was the head of the war hospital for the British Army Aid Group (BAAG) during the war. He further studied in England after the war and practice as a doctor after he returned to Hong Kong.

He was the head of many community organisations, including honorary president of the Eastern Athletic Association, Hoi Tin Athletic Association and Chin Woo Athletic Association. In the 1973 Urban Council election, Wong was nominated by Reform Club of Hong Kong to run in the election. Wong and Tsin Sai-nin, another Reform Club candidate, fell out with Club chairman Brook Bernacchi soon after the election, in which the duo resigned from the Club in 1974. He was re-elected in 1975 but failed to re-elected for his third term in 1979.

Political offices
New seat	Member of the Urban Council; 1973–1979	Succeeded by Augustine Chung
