= 1967 Hong Kong municipal election =

← 1965	7 June 1967	1969 →

5 (of the 10) elected seats to the Urban Council
- Registered: 26,202 ▼10.72%
- Turnout: 10,130 (38.66%) ▲16.54pp
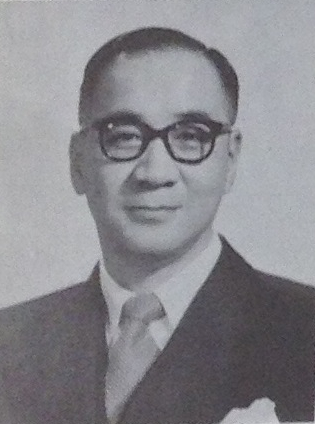
	First party	Second party
Leader	Woo Pak-foo	Brook Bernacchi
Party	Civic	Reform
Seats before	5	4
Seats after	4	4
Seat change	▼1	Steady
Popular vote	14,816	9,789
Percentage	37.69%	24.90%

The 1967 Hong Kong Urban Council election was held on 7 June 1967 for the five of the ten elected seats of the Urban Council of Hong Kong. A record of 38.7 per cent turnout as 10,130 of the 26,202 eligible voters came out and cast their ballots, in the middle of the Leftists' disturbances.

Incumbent Dr. Raymond Harry Shoon Lee, also the Reform Club vice-chairman who had earlier announced his intention retired, left Hong Kong for permanent residence abroad and his vacancy was taken by Woo Po-shing, while prominent activist Elsie Elliott who left the Club earlier and ran as an independent received the highest votes. The other newcomer was independent Dr. Denny Huang who defeated incumbent Cheung Wing-in of the Hong Kong Civic Association.

== Results ==
Urban Council Election 1967
Party	Candidate	Votes	%	±%
Independent	Elsie Elliott	6,924	17.33	–0.09
Independent	Denny Huang Mong-hwa	5,197	13.01	New
Civic	Hilton Cheong-Leen	4,555	11.40	
Reform	Woo Po-shing	4,254	10.65	New
Civic	Solomon Rafeek	3,459	8.66	New
Civic	Cheung Wing-in	3,195	7.80	–13.17
Civic	Peter Chi-kwan Chan	2,145	5.37	
Reform	Napoleon Chung-yiu Ng	1,770	4.43	
Reform	Patrick Pak-toh Wong	1,611	4.03	
Civic	Pun Chung-chik	1,462	3.66	
Labour	George S. Kennedy Skipton	1,262	3.16	
Independent	Maureen Clark	753	1.88	
Reform	Billy K. S. Leong	646	1.62	
Independent	Y. B. Low	569	1.42	
Turnout		10,130	38.66	+16.54
Registered electors		26,202		−10.72
