= 1936 Hong Kong municipal election =

- 13 January 1936
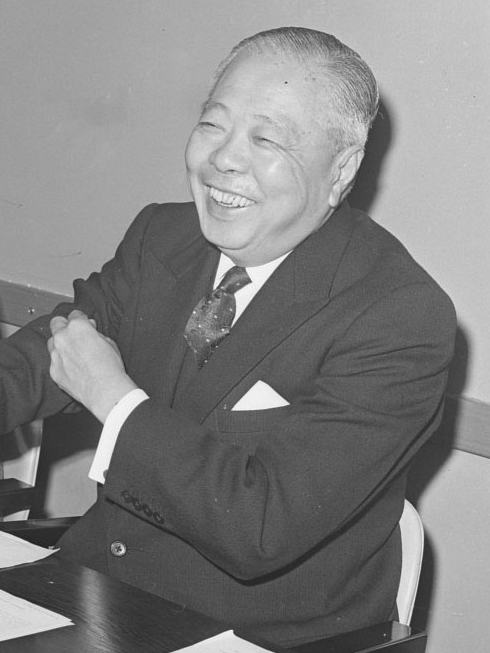
| Nominee | Chau Sik-nin |
| Party | Nonpartisan |
| Popular vote | Uncontested |
Member before election
R. A. de Castro Basto
Elected Member
Chau Sik-nin

The 1936 Hong Kong Urban Council election was supposed to be held on 13 January 1936 for one of the two unofficial seats in the Urban Council of Hong Kong. It was supposed to be the first election after the Sanitary Board was reconstituted into the Urban Council.

Dr. Chau Sik-nin, who later became the Senior Unofficial Member of the Executive and Legislative Council, was elected without being contested.
