= Henry Wong (politician) =

Hong Kong businessman and politician

- Chinese: 王幸利

Member of the Urban Council
- In office 1969-1973

Personal details
- Born: Mei County, Guangdong Province, China

Henry S. L. Wong (Chinese: 王幸利) was a Hong Kong businessman and politician. He was an elected member of the Urban Council of Hong Kong.

== Biography ==
Wong was born in Mei County, Guangdong Province, China. He ran the mining business in Malaysia in his early life and was a leader of the Chinese community in Ipoh, being the manager of the two local corporations and got to know many leaders in Malaysia and Singapore. Wong moved to Hong Kong with his family after the Second World War. He was involved in education industry and opened branches of schools.

He became the candidate of the 1969 Urban Council election for the Hong Kong Civic Association. He was endorsed by the Hong Kong and Kowloon Trades Union Council. In 1973, he was initially nominated by the Civic Association for re-election but failed to get re-elected.

Political offices
Preceded by Woo Pak-foo	Member of the Urban Council; 1969–1973	Succeeded by Edmund Chow
