= 1901 Hong Kong sanitary board election =

- 15 April 1901

The 1901 Hong Kong Sanitary Board election was supposed to be held on 15 April 1901 for the vacancies of two unofficial seats on the Sanitary Board of Hong Kong. Only ratepayers who were included in the special and common jury lists of that year, or ratepayers who were exempted from serving on juries on account of their professional vocations were entitled to vote in the election.

That month, the two elected members on the Sanitary Board had resigned in protest of limitations placed on their powers. No nominations were received for the April election, the public being highly dissatisfied with the Board's conduct.
