= Cecilia Yeung =

Hong Kong politician (1930–2021)

Cecilia Yeung Lai-yin (Chinese: 楊勵賢, 9 June 1930 – 4 January 2021) was the Wong Tai Sin District Board member (1983–1989, 1991–1994) and Urban Councillor (1971–1995). She was also the vice-chairwoman of the Reform Club of Hong Kong, school supervisor and principal of the St. Claire's College.

Yeung was born in Hong Kong on 9 June 1930. She was first elected to the Urban Council in 1971 election while she was questioned by the media with her lack of English ability. She continued to serve in the council until her defeat by the Democratic Party member Wu Chi-wai in the 1995 election. Yeung died on 4 January 2021, at the age of 90.
