= Edmund Chow =

Hong Kong lawyer, businessman, and politician

Edmund Chow Wai-hung (Chinese: 鄒偉雄; born 1 May 1925) is a Hong Kong lawyer, businessman and politician.

Chow was born in 1925 and was educated at the King's College, Hong Kong. He later studied abroad in England and received a law degree. He established Edmund W.H. Chow & Co.. He was the honorary legal adviser for various public organisations and chambers. He also held many positions of various companies, including chairman of the Great Credit Finance Limited, Chow Chow Land and Trading Limited, Hinwong Land Investment Company Limited and Civic Travels Limited. He co-founded the Hong Kong Civic Association in 1954 and became its vice-chairman. He was an elected member of the Urban Council from 1973 to 1986.

Political offices
Preceded by Henry Wong	Member of the Urban Council; Representative for Mong Kok (1983–86); 1973–1986	Succeeded by Chan Kwok-ming
