= Peter Chan Chi-kwan =

Peter Chan Chi-kwan (Chinese: 陳子鈞, 7 March 1936 – March 2017) was a barrister-at-law and a member of the Urban Council of Hong Kong for more than twenty years. He was the founding member and former vice-chairman of the Hong Kong Civic Association and legal adviser to the Hong Kong Federation of Trade Unions. He was also former Kowloon City District Board member (1982–1991), and Urban Councillor (1969–1991). He was first elected to the Urban Council in 1969 and continued to be re-elected in 1973, 1977, 1981, 1983, 1986, and 1989, until he was defeated in 1991.

He also founded the Association of Experts for Modernization in 1979 and was appointed to the Consultative Committee for the Basic Law by the People's Republic of China Government in 1985.

== Citations ==
Political offices
Preceded by Li Yiu-bor	Member of the Urban Council; 1969–1991	Succeeded by Chiang Sai-cheong
New creation	Member of the Kowloon City District Board; Representative for Kowloon Tong and Ma Tau Wai; 1982–1991	Constituency abolished
