= Henry Hu =

Hong Kong barrister and politician (1920–2025)

The Honourable Henry Hu Hung-lick GBM GBS OBE JP
- 胡鴻烈
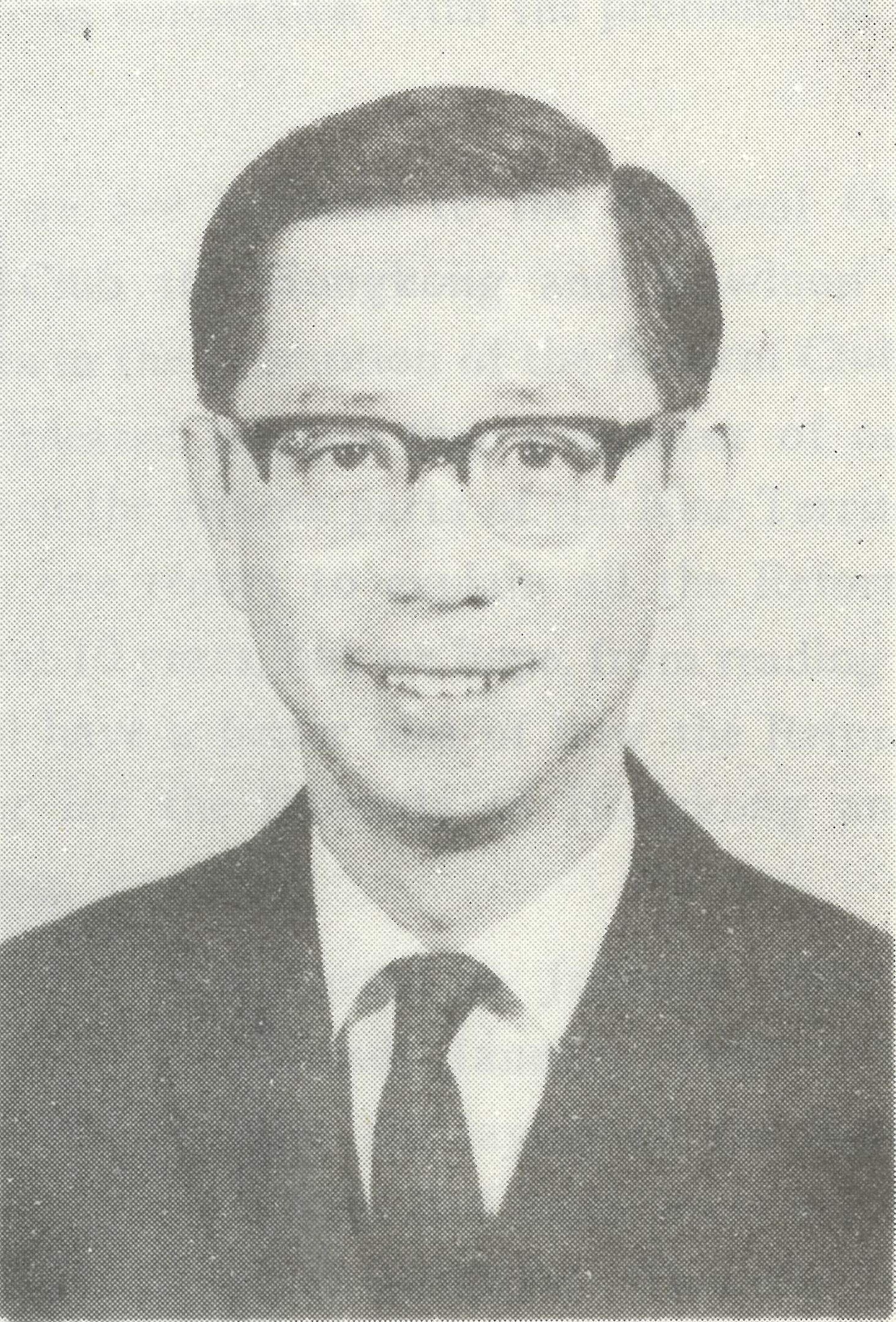
- Hu in circa 1960s

Chancellor of Hong Kong Shue Yan University
- In office 14 February 2007 – 27 July 2025
- President: Chung Chi-yung; Himself

Member of Legislative Council
- In office 6 October 1976 – 10 August 1983
- Appointed by: Murray MacLehose; Edward Youde

Member of Urban Council
- In office 1 April 1965 – 31 March 1981
- Constituency: Directly elected

Personal details
- Born: Henry Hu Hung-lick; 26 February 1920 Shaoxing, Zhejiang, China
- Died: 27 July 2025 (aged 105)
- Spouse: Chung Chi-yung
- Children: 2
- Education: National Chengchi University (LL.B.); University of Paris (PhD)

Henry Hu
- Traditional Chinese: 胡鴻烈
Transcriptions
Yue: Cantonese
- Yale Romanization: Wùh Hùhng liht
- Jyutping: Wu^{4} Hung^{4} lit^{6}

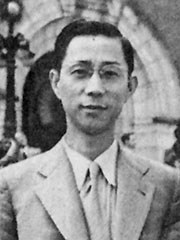
Hu in circa 1940s

Henry Hu Hung-lick (Chinese: 胡鴻烈, 26 February 1920 – 27 July 2025) was a barrister and politician in Hong Kong who served as the vice-chairman of the Reform Club, Legislative Council member, and vice-chairperson of the Urban Council.

== Diplomat career ==
Born into a poor family, Hu only received a formal education beginning at the age of 9, but finished all his primary education requirements within 2.5 years, and earned an excellent result in the secondary school admission examination among all students in Chekiang. Hu graduated from the National University of Political Science in 1942 where he studied diplomacy.

In 1945, Hu, along with his wife whom he had just married, went to Tashkent, Soviet Union to begin his diplomatic career. Following the change of regime in China after which the Republic of China government retreated to Taiwan, he decided to study at the University of Paris and received a doctoral degree and a diploma of high studies in international law and international affairs in 1952. He qualified as a barrister in the UK in 1954, and began his legal practice upon his return to Hong Kong a year later.

Hu, long a patriot of his homeland, eventually gave up being a barrister in Hong Kong, reportedly because of his unwillingness to revoke his Chinese nationality. During his legal practice in Hong Kong, Hu handled some infamous cases, including the Happy Valley cardboard box murder.

== Political career ==
Hu was elected to the Urban Council in 1965, criticising the government on its fare increase for Star Ferry foot passengers. Hu then was appointed to the Legislative Council in 1976 as an unofficial member, and met Chinese leader Deng Xiaoping in 1979, becoming the first Hong Kong legislator to enter the PRC. His Legco membership term ended in 1983, and he entered the Chinese People's Political Consultative Conference four years later.

== Personal life and death ==
Hu was born on 26 February 1920. He married Chung Chi-yung; together they had two children. They co-founded Hong Kong Shue Yan College, which would become the first private university in Hong Kong.

Hu died on 27 July 2025, at the age of 105, and a grave was erected at Hong Kong Cemetery in honor of him and his wife.

== Sources ==
- Urban Council, Urban Council Annual Report, 1974
- Hong Kong Newspaper Clippings Online
