= Reform Club of Hong Kong =

One of oldest political organisations in Hong Kong

Reform Club of Hong Kong 香港革新會
- Chairman: Brook Bernacchi
- Founded: 20 January 1949
- Dissolved: c. 1995
- Ideology: Liberalism (HK)

Reform Club of Hong Kong
- Traditional Chinese: 香港革新會
Transcriptions
Yue: Cantonese
- Yale Romanization: Hēung góng gaak sān wuih
- Jyutping: Hoeng1 gong2 gaak3 san1 wui6

The Reform Club of Hong Kong was one of the oldest political organisations in Hong Kong, existing from 1949 until the mid-1990s. Established by expatriates who were concerned about the Young Plan proposed by Governor Mark Aitchison Young in 1949, the Reform Club was the first semi-political party to contest in the Urban Council elections, with its longtime chairman Brook Bernacchi serving on the Council for about forty years.

It demanded expansion of the power of the Urban Council and elected representatives in the Legislative Council for years. Together with the Hong Kong Civic Association, they were the closest to opposition parties in Hong Kong active in the municipal electoral politics during the post-war colonial period. With the expansion of the franchise in the 1980s, the Reform Club gradually declined and was replaced by the more energetic political groups. The Club ceased to function after its chairman Bernacchi retired from the Urban Council in 1995.

== History ==
The Reform Club was founded by expatriate barrister Brook Bernacchi in 1949 in the midst of the debate over the Young Plan, a plan for wide constitutional reform in Hong Kong. The immediate target of the Club was to campaign for direct elections to the Legislative Council of Hong Kong. Unlike the Hong Kong Chinese Reform Association, which was set up during the same time for similar causes, the Reform Club was dominated by expatriates.

For decades the Reform Club and the Civic Association dominated municipal politics as they provided most of the elected members of the Urban Council. It advocated more representative government in the territory and the improvement of public sector social services. In 1960, the two groups formed a coalition and sent a delegate to London to demand direct elections to the Legislative Council. The Reform Club adopted a modest stance amid the 1966 riots, opposing violent actions from both protesters and the police. In 1979, the Reform Club threatened to boycott elections if the Urban Council would not receive a majority of elected members and universal franchise was extended to all Hong Kong citizens. In 1982, it took part in the elections for the newly established district boards in the urban districts, which significantly extended the franchise.

Starting from the late 1960s, the Club's ability to monopolise Urban Council elections with the Civic Association eroded, in light of the emergence of the popular independent candidates. Before the expansion of the franchise, the Reform Club had 15 members in the Urban Council of 1983. But the Reform Club's influence in the Urban Council reduced during the 1980s. Following the 1989 municipal elections, only five Reform Club members remained due to its lack of grassroots support. The Reform Club and Civic Association were gradually supplanted by the new pro-democracy groups including the Hong Kong Association for Democracy and People's Livelihood and Meeting Point. When at the 1995 municipal elections Brook Bernacchi retired, the Reform Club ceased to be active in the Hong Kong political scene.

== Notable members ==
- Brook Bernacchi (founder)
- Alison Bell
- Chan Shu-woon
- Elsie Elliott (later known as Elsie Tu)
- Henry Hu
- Kan Yuet Keung
- Charles Edgar Loseby
- Cecilia Yeung

== Election performance ==
=== Municipal elections ===
Election	Number of popular votes	% of popular votes	UrbCo seats	RegCo seats	Total elected seats
1952	2,199	33.58	1 / 2	-	
1953	6,374▲	71.25▲	4 / 4	-	
1954	7,773▲	79.64▲	4 / 4	-	
1955	3,283▼	89.62▲	4 / 4	-	
1956	17,085▲	56.97▼	6 / 8	–	
1957	11,716▲	43.50▼	5 / 8	–	
1959	12,030▼	47.67▼	4 / 8	–	
1961	uncontested	uncontested	4 / 8	–	
1963	5,177▼	39.43▼	3 / 8	–	
1965	unknown	unknown	5 / 10	–	
1967	9,789▲	24.90▼	4 / 10	–	
1969	16,571▲	49.22▲	3 / 10	–	
1971	6,139▼	16.22▼	3 / 10	–	
1973	25,709▲	55.14▲	5 / 12	–	
1975	6,141▲	12.41▼	3 / 12	–	
1977	13,249▼	41.05▲	3 / 12	–	
1979	9,579▲	18.76▲	3 / 12	–	
1981	7,291▼	28.29▼	2 / 12	–	
1983	13,894▲	15.38▼	3 / 15	–	
1986	24,486▲	6.95▼	2 / 15	0 / 12	2 / 27
1989	13,404▼	6.31▼	2 / 15	0 / 12	2 / 27
1991	9,045▼	2.31▼	2 / 15	0 / 12	2 / 27

=== District Board/Council elections ===
Election	Number of popular votes	% of popular votes	Total elected seats	+/−
1982	13,644	3.83	2 / 132	
1985	39,929▲	5.77▲	17 / 237	7▲
1988	13,572▼	2.13▼	5 / 264	5▼
1991	2,136▼	0.40▼	1 / 272	5▼
