= Hong Kong Civic Association =

Hong Kong Civic Association 香港公民協會
- Life President: Hilton Cheong-Leen
- Chairman: Lam Kwok-wah
- Founded: 26 October 1954; 72 years ago
- Ideology: Centrism (HK); Conservatism (HK); Liberal conservatism
- Political position: Centre to centre-right
- Regional affiliation: Pro-Beijing camp
- Colours: Green

Website
- www.hkcivicassn.org

Hong Kong Civic Association
- Traditional Chinese: 香港公民協會
- Simplified Chinese: 香港公民协会
Transcriptions
Yue: Cantonese
- Yale Romanization: Hēung góng gūng màhn hip wuih
- Jyutping: Hoeng^{1} gong^{2} gung^{1} man^{4} hip^{3} wui^{6}

The Hong Kong Civic Association is one of the oldest existing political organisations in Hong Kong. Established in 1954 by a group of teachers, professionals and businessmen, the Civic Association was one of the two semi-political parties to participate in the Urban Council elections since the 1950s, alongside Reform Club of Hong Kong. They were the only two organisations closest to the opposition parties dominated in the post-war colonial period before the expansion of the franchise in the 1980s.

Although the Civic Association petitioned for constitutional reforms in the 1960s, it was considered relatively centrist and conservative to its counterpart. In the 1980s, its chairman Hilton Cheong-Leen became the first Chinese chairman of the Urban Council and member of the Legislative Council through the Urban Council electoral college. In the late 1980s, the Civic Association collaborated with Maria Tam's Progressive Hong Kong Society and subsequently the pro-business conservative Liberal Democratic Federation of Hong Kong. It has become part of the pro-Beijing camp since the 1990s.

== Beliefs ==
Members mostly consisting of teachers and some professionals and businessmen, the Civic Association was seen as a predominantly Chinese, centrist and conservative political group compared to the Reform Club of Hong Kong, its counterpart in the Urban Council before the 1980s. At its foundation, the objectives of the associations were:

- to actively promote the economic, social and cultural welfare of the people of Hong Kong; a sound and expanding programme of education in Hong Kong; close co-operation and understanding between government and the public;
- to do whatever is possible to protect the rights of women and children in Hong Kong;
- to encourage great interest and participation in public affairs;
- to study the machinery of government in Hong Kong and to increase the effectiveness and prestige of government through constructive suggestion;
- to advocate an increase in the size and scope of the political franchise in the colony;
- to participate in local politics for promotion and achievement of the objects of the association;
- to study and act on any other matter of interest the association; and
- to raise and disburse any funds for any of the above objections.

The Civic Association claimed to promote "stability, prosperity and progress" in its electoral slogan. It focused more on social and livelihood issues such as cost of living the adequacy of hospitals and rentals.

The association also drew attention to constitutional issues, demanding greater power of the Urban Council in education and health matters, and also elected representatives in the Legislative Council and Executive Council. However the association refrained from calling for self-government and independence, a political stance it regarded as the major demarcation between the association and the radical groups, such as the United Nations Association of Hong Kong. it argued that any "radical change" would threaten Hong Kong's stability.

== History ==
The Civic Association was founded on 26 October 1954 in Hong Kong by Brother Brigant Cassian, who was a French-born religious educator and also the founder of the Hong Kong Teachers' Association. It was one of the civil organisations to strive for constitutional reform as proposed by the then Governor Mark Aitchison Young in 1946. It sent the petition endorsed by 406 organisations with half a million affiliated members. It began to contest in the Urban Council since the 1956 Urban Council election. They included political reform in their campaign platform and won 2 of the 6 seats. In the 1950s, its representation increased from two to eight seats in the Urban Council. After Cassian died in 1957 and three conservative expatriate leaders resigned in 1959, Hilton Cheong-Leen became the head of the association.

Cheong-Leen was determined to change Hong Kong's "colonial museum piece" status. In 1960, the association formed a coalition with the Reform Club, led by Peter Lee Chung-yin, co-founder of the Civic Association and also Secretary-General of the association between 1958 and 1964. The Civic Reform Coalition sent a delegate to London to press the British government for constitutional reform. They demanded a 50–50 split between elected and appointed Legislative Councillors plus a majority of elected seats on a "lower house" Urban Council with expanded powers. Their demands were rejected by London without explanation, their demands were not achieved until 40 years later in the 1990s.

Starting from the late 1960s, the membership of the Civic Association decreased and its ability to monopolise Urban Council elections with the Reform Club eroded. In 1975 the association claimed a membership of 10,000.

Hilton Cheong-Leen was also the Chairman of the Urban Council in the 1980s and the first elected Urban Council member appointed to the Legislative Council. In 1987, the Association held 4 seats in the Legislative Council; 4 seats in Urban Council; 1 seat in Regional Council; 18 seats in the district boards, in total 27 seats. The association formed an alliance with Maria Tam's Progressive Hong Kong Society since the latter's establishment in 1985. In the 1988 District Board elections, the association cooperated with Progressive Hong Kong Society, and subsequently the conservative pro-business Liberal Democratic Federation of Hong Kong in the 1991 elections. It was absorbed into the Beijing government's "United Front" on the eve of the transfer of sovereignty over Hong Kong in the 1990s. It has remained low-profile after the 1997 handover.

== Election performance ==
=== Legislative Council elections ===
Election	Number of popular votes	% of popular votes	EC seats	GC seats	FC seats	Total seats	+/−
1985	Electoral college		3	0	–	3 / 60	2▲
1988	Electoral college		1	0	–	1 / 60	2▼
1991	35,616	2.60	–	0	0	0 / 60	1▼

Note: Each voter got two votes in the 1991 Election.

=== Municipal elections ===
Election	Number of popular votes	% of popular votes	UrbCo seats	RegCo seats	Total elected seats
1956	12,907	43.03	2 / 8	–	
1957	15,219▲	56.50▲	3 / 8	–	
1959	6,010▼	23.82▼	4 / 8	–	
1961	uncontested	uncontested	4 / 8	–	
1963	2,565▼	19.53▼	4 / 8	–	
1965	unknown	unknown	5 / 10	–	
1967	14,816▲	37.69▲	4 / 10	–	
1969	14,335▼	42.58▲	5 / 10	–	
1971	13,016▼	34.38▼	5 / 10	–	
1973	20,912▲	44.86▲	5 / 12	–	
1975	15,487▲	31.30▼	4 / 12	–	
1977	15,098▼	46.78▲	4 / 12	–	
1979	9,792▼	19.09▼	4 / 12	–	
1981	11,688▼	45.35▼	4 / 12	–	
1983	23,576▲	18.58▼	4 / 15	–	
1986	44,427▲	12.60▼	3 / 15	0 / 12	3 / 27
1989	15,270▼	7.18▼	4 / 15	0 / 12	4 / 27
1991	22,048▲	5.63▼	2 / 15	0 / 12	2 / 27
1995	189▼	0.03▼	0 / 32	0 / 27	0 / 59

=== District Board/Council elections ===
Election	Number of popular votes	% of popular votes	Total elected seats	+/−
1982	32,866	9.22	14 / 132	
1985	38,544▲	5.57▼	21 / 237	7▲
1988	42,397▲	6.65▲	16 / 264	3▲
1991	24,760▼	4.66▼	11 / 272	3▲
2007	390	0.03	0 / 405	0
