= Arnaldo de Oliveira Sales =

Hong Kong businessman (1920–2020)

The Honourable Arnaldo de Oliveira Sales 沙利士 GBM CBE GCIH JP

Chairman of Urban Council
- In office 1 April 1973 – 31 March 1983
- Succeeded by: Hilton Cheong-Leen

Personal details
- Born: Arnaldo Augusto de Oliveira Sales; 13 January 1920 Shamian French Concession, Canton
- Died: 6 March 2020 (aged 100) Hong Kong

Arnaldo de Oliveira Sales
- Chinese: 沙利士
Transcriptions
Standard Mandarin
- Hanyu Pinyin: Shā Lìshì
Yue: Cantonese
- Yale Romanization: Sā Leih sih
- Jyutping: Saa^{1} Lei^{6} si^{6}

Arnaldo Augusto de Oliveira Sales GBM CBE GCIH JP (Chinese: 沙利士; 13 January 1920 – 6 March 2020) was a Hong Kong-Portuguese sports figure who was chairman of the Hong Kong Olympic Academy and president of the Sports Federation and Olympic Committee of Hong Kong.

He was for many years an unofficial member of the Urban Council and became its first unofficial chairman from 1973-81. He was also a member of the Hong Kong Basic Law Consultative Committee.

== Biography ==
Sales was born in Shameen, Canton in the French concession in about 1920, where his great-great-grandfather had settled. He came to Hong Kong at the age of 8 and attended several Roman Catholic schools, including St Joseph's Branch School, La Salle College and St Joseph's Seminary, Macau. After he returned to Hong Kong, he attended a business school to prepare for joining the family business. He evacuated to Macau with other third nationals during the Second World War.

After he returned to Hong Kong, Sales married his childhood friend, Edith. He helped rehabilitate the Portuguese Club, the Club Lusitano de Hong Kong, and participated in the administration of the club and sports. He helped found the Amateur Sports Federation and Olympic Committee with other sports-conscious people in 1950, and became the Committee's president. He also joined the Junior Chamber of Commerce and was elected its world president in 1955; he traveled to more than 80 countries in that capacity.

He was appointed a member of the Urban Council from 1 April 1957, and its first unofficial chairman elected by the members of the council from 1 April 1973 until 1981. He retained his Portuguese nationality. He died in Hong Kong, aged 100.

== Honours ==
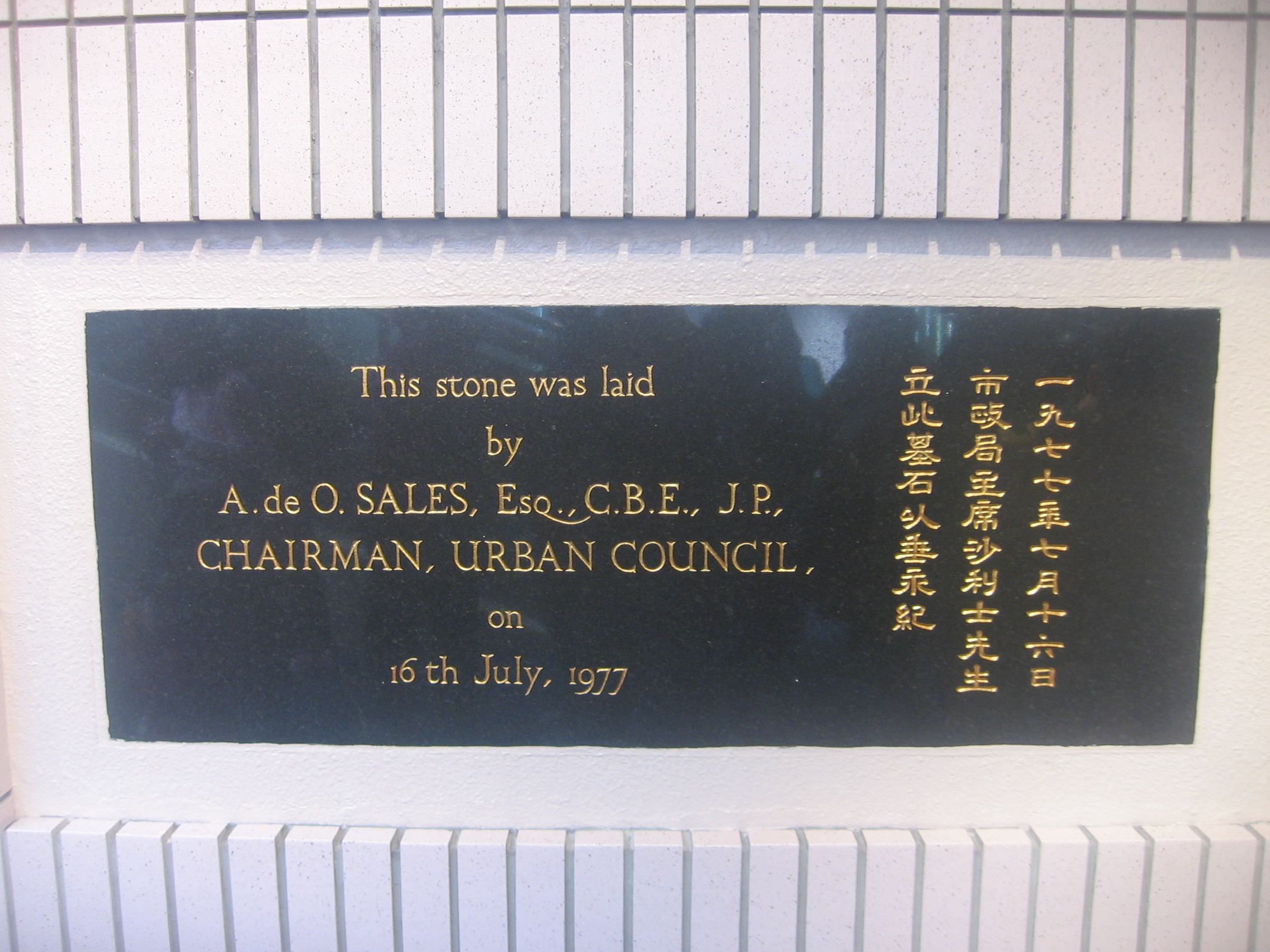
A stone laid by Arnaldo de Oliveira Sales at Hong Kong Space Museum

Sales received numerous honours for his public service including being made an Honorary Officer of the Order of the British Empire (OBE), later elevated to Honorary Commander of the Order of the British Empire (CBE), a Grand Cross of the Portuguese Order of Prince Henry (GCIH, in 1999), and the Grand Bauhinia Medal (GBM) in 1998.

== See also ==
- List of people with Hong Kong SAR honours since 1997
- Rogerio Hyndman Lobo
- José Pedro Braga

== Sources ==
- Urban Council, Urban Council Annual Report, 1974

Political offices
Preceded by D. R. W. Alexander as Director of Urban Services	Chairman of the Urban Council; 1973–1981	Succeeded by Hilton Cheong-Leen
