= Brook Bernacchi =

Hong Kong politician (1922–1996)

Brook Bernacchi OBE QC JP
- Bernacchi c. 1950s

Member of the Urban Council
- In office 31 May 1952 – 31 March 1981
- Preceded by: New seat
- Succeeded by: Francis Cahine
- In office 1 April 1983 – 31 March 1986
- Preceded by: New constituency
- Succeeded by: Cheung Wai-ping
- Constituency: Shau Kei Wan
- In office 1 April 1989 – 31 March 1995
- Preceded by: Augustine Tong
- Succeeded by: To Boon-man
- Constituency: Shau Kei Wan

Personal details
- Born: 22 January 1922 London, United Kingdom
- Died: 22 September 1996 (aged 74) United Kingdom
- Party: Reform Club of Hong Kong
- Spouse: Patricia Sheelagh
- Children: 3
- Education: Westminster School; University of Cambridge
- Occupation: Barrister

Brook Bernacchi
- Traditional Chinese: 貝納褀
Transcriptions
Yue: Cantonese
- Yale Romanization: Bui Naahp kèih
- Jyutping: Bui^{3} Naap^{6} kei^{4}

Brook Antony Bernacchi (Chinese: 貝納祺; 22 January 1922 – 22 September 1996) was a lawyer and politician in Hong Kong. He was the long-time chairman of the Reform Club of Hong Kong, the then quasi-opposition party in the colony and the longest serving elected officeholder in Hong Kong history, sitting on the Urban Council of Hong Kong, from 1952 to 1981, 1983 to 1986 and 1989 to 1995. He was well known for his efforts of pushing direct elections and political reform in Hong Kong.

== Early life ==
Bernacchi was born in London in 1922 and was educated in Westminster School and Cambridge University. He was called to the Bar in 1943 and joined the Royal Marines during World War II. He arrived in Hong Kong as part of the liberation forces in 1945 and joined the Hong Kong Bar Association in 1946 and was its chairman in 1963. He also became Queen's Counsel in 1960.

== Political career ==
In 1949, Bernacchi founded the Reform Club of Hong Kong, a political organisation consisting mostly of expatriates in the midst of the discussion on the Young Plan, a proposed constitutional reform put forward by Governor Mark Aitchison Young. He represented the club to run in the first Urban Council election in the post-war period, in 1952, and went on to hold the position for most of his public life.

The club, under Bernacchi's chairmanship, was involved in grassroots politics, calling for public housing for all, as thousands of refugees flooded into Hong Kong from the Communist uprising in China. He gained a reputation for outspokenness. For instance, he opposed Financial Secretary Sir Philip Haddon-Cave and his "positive non-interventionism", criticising him for cutting expenditure on the overdue housing programme. He also helped set up various groups including the Society for the Aid and Rehabilitation of Drug Abusers and the Discharged Prisoners Aid Society.

For his public services, he was awarded officer of the Order of the British Empire (OBE) in 1965.

He and Elsie Elliott, another Reform Club Urban Councillor and a prominent social activist, were both questioned after the 1966 Kowloon Riots as they were indirectly involved in the riots by speaking for the protesters. He was also criticised for his dictatorial style of chairing the club. Elliott resigned from the club after receiving a stern rebuke from Bernacchi for her self-appointed delegation to London in May 1966.

Bernacchi showed rare support to the colonial government during the 1967 leftist riot and endorsed an outright crackdown.

Bernacchi had also been one of the leading voices for constitutional reform in Hong Kong since the 1950s. In 1978, he wrote to the Foreign Secretary David Owen that half of the Hong Kong population, 62 percent of those aged 18 to 34, "positively want a measure of elected representation" in the Legislative Council. He warned the British government that "if the voice of the people is not taken heed of now" there could be "disturbances". The warning received little attention from the government.

Seeing the increasing frustration with the limited franchise and the unwillingness of the government to introduce more elected offices, Bernacchi threatened to boycott the Urban Council elections in 1979. He later on stepped down in 1981, saying he wanted "no more to do with it" when the Government drew back from a pledge of universal suffrage. He also asked rhetorically, "how can one purport to represent nearly six million people in Hong Kong when you have been elected by only 6,000 voters?" He nevertheless led the club again in the following election, failing to win his seat, but was returned in 1983. In the 1986 election, Bernacchi again lost his seat, to Cheung Wai-ping, in Shau Kei Wan, before returning yet again in 1989.

In 1994, he became one of two foreigners appointed Hong Kong district affairs advisers to Beijing. As political reform and electoral politics developed rapidly in the last years of colonial rule, Bernacchi announced his retirement from the council in 1995, complaining that the council was becoming increasingly politicised.

== Personal life and death ==
He married Patricia Sheelagh Heath in 1970. He had three stepchildren, Robert Whitehead, SC (formerly vice-chairman of the Hong Kong Bar Association), Dr. Ian Whitehead and Mrs. Sarah Driver (née Whitehead).

He became the first Westerner to settle on Lantau Island in 1948. Having been inspired by the tea farms he visited in Burma during the Second World War, he set up a commercial tea plantation at Ngong Ping next to the Po Lin Monastery. In 1973, he became a chairman of New Lantao Motor Bus Company Ltd. He was also one of the original founders of the Hong Kong Sea School, in Stanley, Hong Kong, which was set up to train young disadvantaged boys for a career in the Navy.

Bernacchi developed a brain tumour in 1961 which was diagnosed as benign but which left him with impaired use of his left arm and a limp. He died on 22 September 1996, aged 74. Prior to his death, he was the longest standing and most senior member of the Bar.

Political offices
New seat	Member of the Urban Council; 1952–1981	Succeeded by Francis Chaine
New constituency	Member of the Urban Council; Representative for Shau Kei Wan; 1983–1986	Succeeded by Cheung Wai-ping
Preceded by Cheung Wai-ping	Member of the Urban Council; Representative for Shau Kei Wan; 1989–1995	Succeeded by To Boon-man
Preceded by Augustine Tong	Member of the Eastern District Board; Representative for Chai Wan North; 1988–1991	Succeeded by Christopher Chung
Legal offices
Preceded by Leo D'Almada	Chairman of the Hong Kong Bar Association; 1963	Succeeded by S. V. Gittins
