= Urban Council =

Municipal council in Hong Kong

Urban Council 市政局
- Emblem of Urban Council

Type
- Type: Municipal council

History
- Established: 18 April 1883
- Disbanded: 31 December 1999

Elections
- Voting system: First-past-the-post
- Last election: 5 March 1995

Meeting place
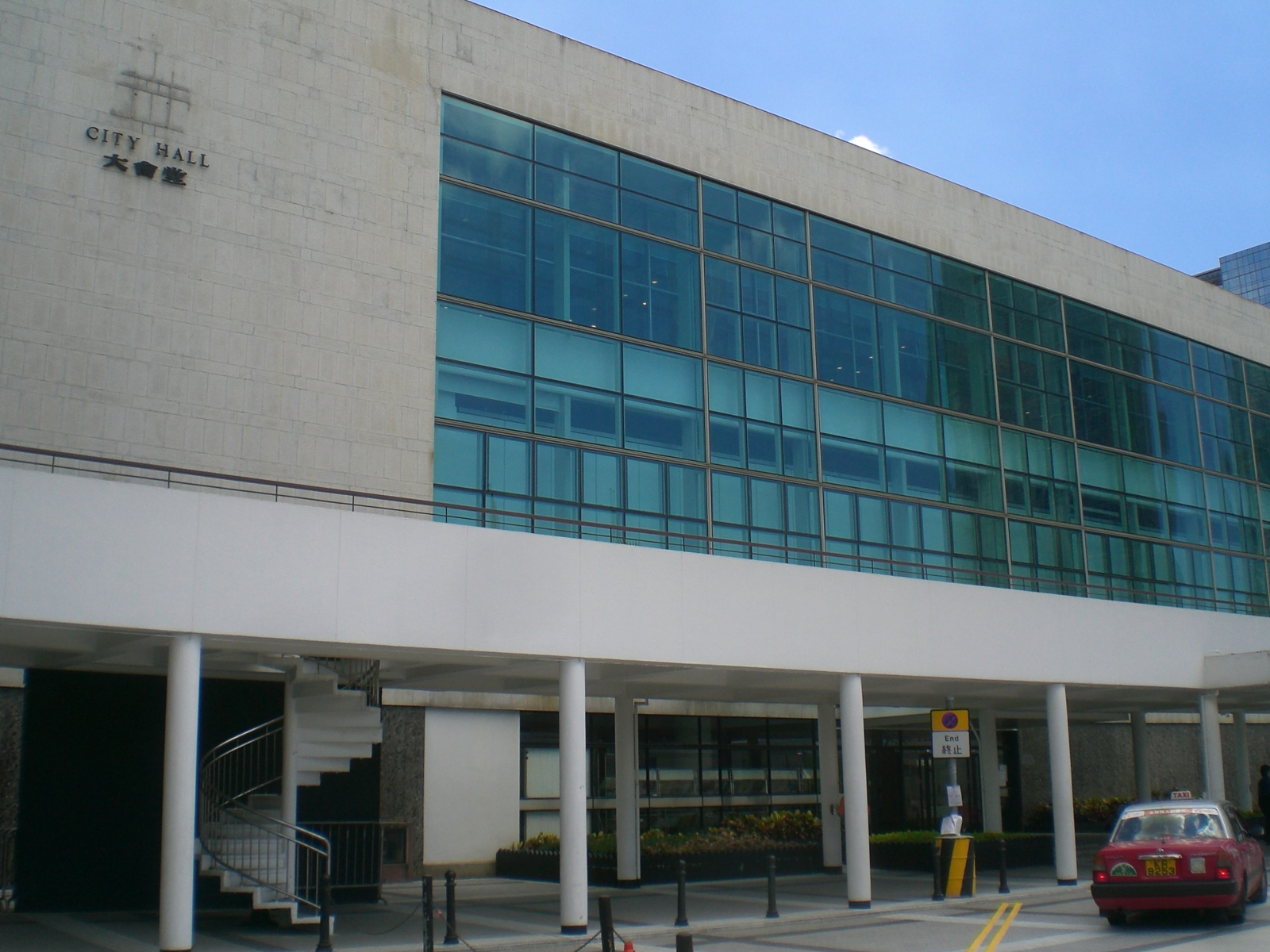
- City Hall Lower Block, Edinburgh Place

Urban Council
- Chinese: 市政局
Transcriptions
Standard Mandarin
- Hanyu Pinyin: Shìzhèng Jú
Yue: Cantonese
- Yale Romanization: síh jing guhk
- Jyutping: si^{5} zing^{3} guk^{6}

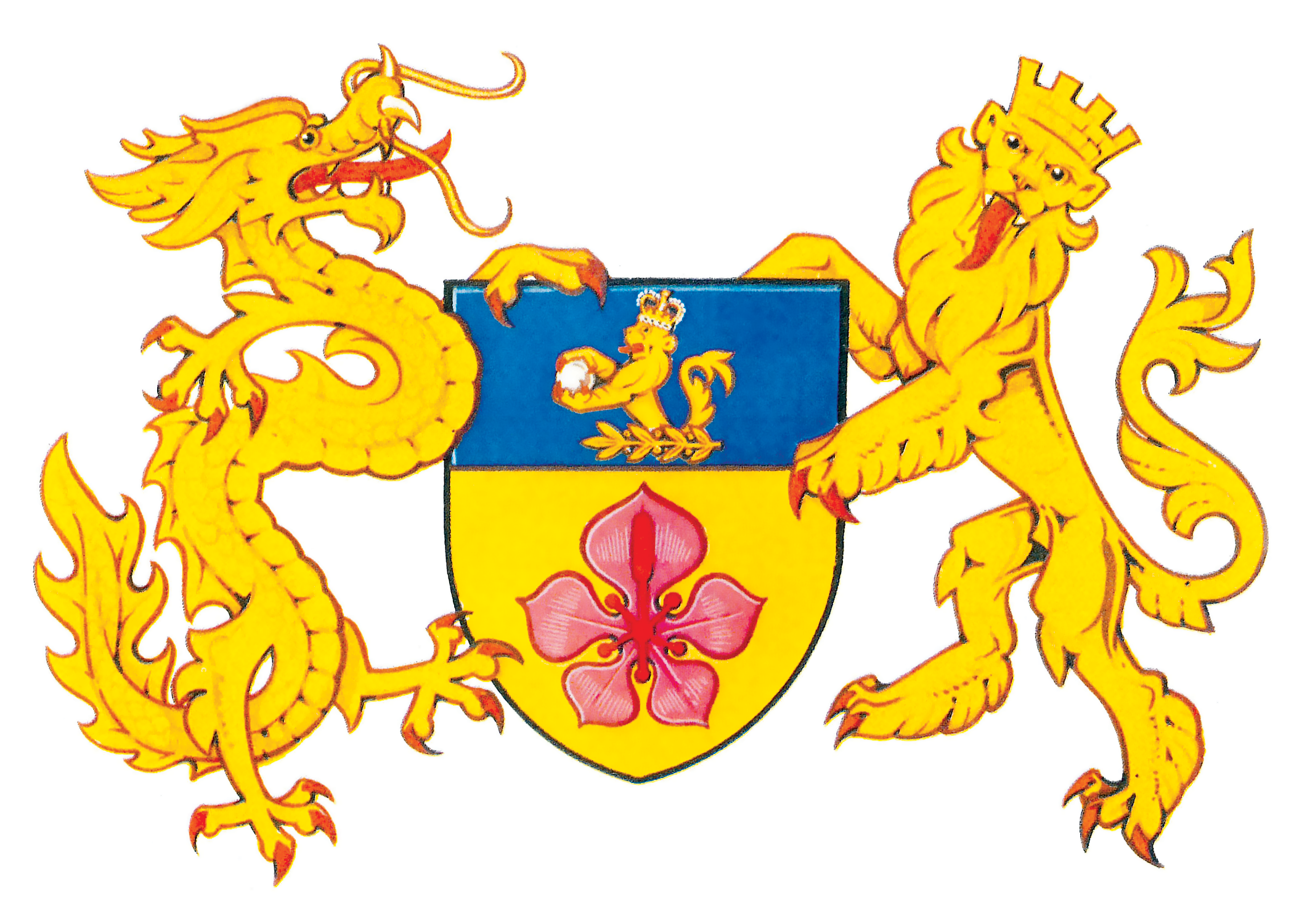
The armorial bearings granted by the College of Arms, appointed by the British Sovereign, a part of the Royal Household of the United Kingdom.

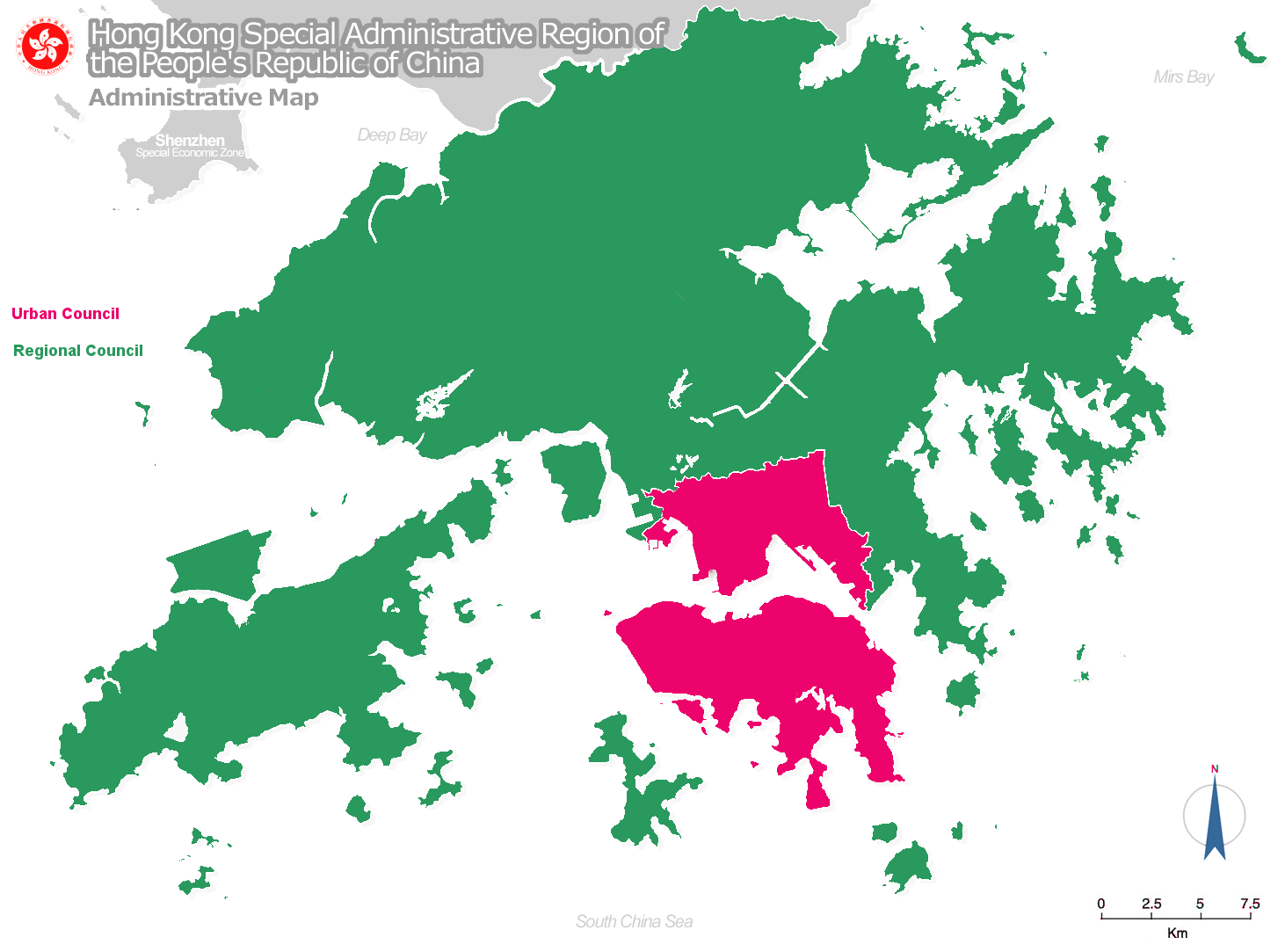
The Urban Council's service area (in pink).

The Urban Council ran numerous public services including public libraries. Shown here is the logo of the Urban Council Public Library Reading Programme, a reading programme in the 1990s which provided gifts as incentives for children to read, based on the number of books they borrowed and read.

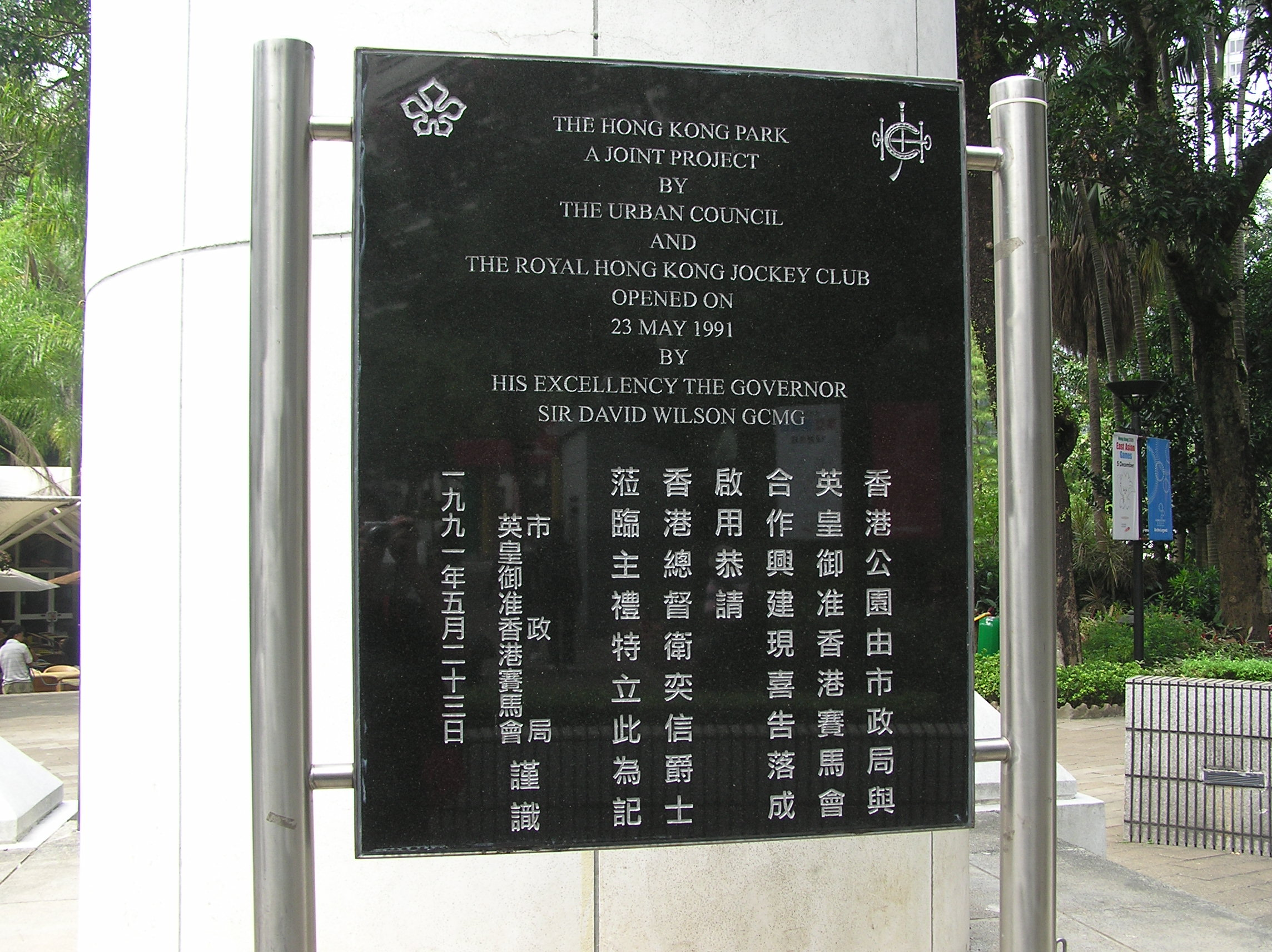
The Hong Kong Park was jointly built by the Urban Council and the Royal Hong Kong Jockey Club

The Urban Council (UrbCo) was a municipal council in Hong Kong responsible for municipal services on Hong Kong Island and in Kowloon (including New Kowloon). These services were provided by the council's executive arm, the Urban Services Department. Later, the equivalent body for the New Territories was the Regional Council.

The council was founded as the Sanitary Board in 1883. It was renamed the Urban Council when new legislation was passed in 1936 expanding its mandate. In 1973 the council was reorganised under non-government control and became financially autonomous. Originally composed mainly of ex-officio and appointed members, by the time the Urban Council was disbanded following the Handover it was composed entirely of members elected by universal suffrage.

== History ==
The Urban Council was first established as the Sanitary Board in 1883. In 1887, a system of partial elections was established, allowing selected individuals to vote for members of the Board. On 1 March 1935, the Sanitary Board was reconstituted to carry out the work which remained much the same until the Second World War broke out. The board was renamed the Urban Council in 1936 when the government passed the Urban Council Ordinance, which gave legal motive to the already expanding range of services provided by the council.

After the Second World War ended in 1945, the Council returned to its pre-war form but without any elected members. The work of the Sanitary Department of the government began to separate out from the medical and health service. On 28 May 1946, the Council met for the first time after the Japanese occupation. It was given power to carry out all its old duties – cleaning, burying the dead, running bath houses and public lavatories, hawker control – as well as some new ones, such as the use of bathing beaches throughout Hong Kong.

Only in May 1952 did elections return to the Urban Council. Two members were elected. Later in 1952, the number of elected members was doubled, their terms of office extended to two years, and the franchise enlarged.

By April 1956, half of the members of the Urban Council were elected, but by a minority of the population. A voter had to be at least 21 years of age, to have lived in Hong Kong for at least three years and to be qualified in at least one of 23 categories, which included educational qualifications (School Certificate Examination or equivalent), be a juror, salaried taxpayer, or a member of certain professional organisations. More details can be found in Schedule 1 of the Urban Council Ordinance (Cap. 101, Laws of Hong Kong). It was estimated that in 1970 there were 250,000 eligible voters and in 1981 the number had increased to 400,000 – 500,000.

In the 1960s, the duties of the Urban Council continued to multiply. City Hall in Central was opened in 1962, followed by the first multi-storey market in Jardine's Bazaar in March 1963.

In 1973, the council was reorganised under non-government control. It was given financial autonomy, which meant the budget could be planned without the approval of the Legislative Council. It was also no longer primarily in charge of housing. From then onwards, there were no government officials on the council and both the chairman and vice-chairman were elected among the 24 members. At the time, the council was unique in consisting solely of members of the public.

The Urban Council celebrated its centenary in 1983, with the Urban Council Centenary Garden in Tsim Sha Tsui East named to commemorate the occasion.

In the 1960s, the council proposed that its jurisdiction should be expanded to encompass the entire colony, but this was not accepted. The Urban Services Department already provided services in the New Territories despite the council not having jurisdiction there. In 1979, the New Territories Services Department was created (within the Urban Services Department) as a dedicated unit to take up these responsibilities.

In 1986, Regional Council was set up to serve the New Territories (excluding New Kowloon), analogous to the Urban Council. The New Territories Services Department was reorganised to form the Regional Services Department, separate from the USD, the executive arm of the Regional Council.

In 1994, the Council became fully elected based on universal and equal adult suffrage.

After the transfer of sovereignty on 1 July 1997, the council's name was changed to Provisional Urban Council, consisting of members of the pre-handover Council, and new members were appointed by the Chief Executive.

== Members and elections ==
Elections for unofficial members of the Urban Council were held since 1888. Suffrage was restricted to residents on the special and common jury lists between 1888 and 1973.

In 1973, the electoral franchise was widened to residents above 21 years of age who have lived in Hong Kong for at least three years that qualified in at least one of 23 specified categories, which included educational qualifications (School Certificate Examination or equivalent), be a juror, salaried taxpayer, or a member of certain professional organisations as listed in Schedule 1 of the Urban Council Ordinance (Cap. 101, Laws of Hong Kong). Half of the members of the Urban Council were elected, but by a minority of the population. It was estimated that in 1970 there were 250,000 eligible voters and in 1981 the number had increased to 400,000 – 500,000. Prominent elected Urban Councilors included Elsie Tu and Brook Bernacchi of the Reform Club.

The size of the Urban Council is as follows:

	Ex officio members	Appointed unofficials	Elected unofficials	Elected by District Boards	Total
1888	4	4	2	-	10
1901	5	4	2	-	11
1903	4	4	2	-	10
1936	5	6	2	-	13
1946	5	6	-	-	11
1952	5	6	2	-	13
1953	5	6	4	-	15
1954 (Note: One temporary additional ex-offcio member, the Commissioner for Resettlement, appointed on a year-to-year basis since 1954. This appointment was made permanent in January 1965.)	6	6	4	-	16
1956	6	8	8	-	22
1965	6	10	10	-	26
1973	-	12	12	-	24
1983	-	15	15	-	30
1989	-	15	15	10	40
1995	-	-	32	9	41

The electorate and turnout of selected Urban Council elections before the expansion of electoral franchise is as follows:

Year	Number of registered voters	Number of registered voters who voted in the election	Voting rate (%)
1952	9,074	3,368	35.0
1965	29,529	6,492	22.0
1967	26,275	10,189	38.8
1969	34,392	8,175	23.8
1971	37,788	10,047	26.6
1973	31,284	8,675	24.4
1975	34,078	10,903	32.0
1977	37,174	7,308	19.7
1979	31,481	12,426	39.5
1981	34,381	6,195	18.0

=== Expansion of Electoral Franchise ===
The Green Paper: A Pattern of District Administration in Hong Kong was published on 6 June 1980 for public consultations on reforming local administration in Hong Kong. The Green Paper recommended that:

- the number of appointed members in the Urban Council be increased to 15 to maintain the pre-existing ratio between appointed and elected members;
- 8 constituencies be created for the Urban Council, with 7 multi-member constituencies and 1 single-member constituency; and
- 1-2 constituencies in each district; each constituency represents 250,000.

Upon the conclusion of public consultations, the White Paper: District Administration in Hong Kong was published in January 1981. The White Paper solidified expansion of suffrage for Urban Council elections. The Urban Council (Amendment) Ordinance 1981 was subsequently enacted in 1981 to provide for the expansion of electoral franchise and creation of constituencies to the Urban Council election on 8 March 1983:

- number of elected and appointed members increased from 12 to 15 members each;
- 15 single-member constituencies created (each of 250,000 population), elected through first-past-the-post voting; and
- the term of UC members elected in 1981 shortened to 2 years to accommodate Urban Council elections under the reformed electoral methods in 1983.

The electoral franchise were expanded to around 568,000 voters upon implementation of the White Paper, which marked an increase by 17 times:

- minimum voting age to remain at 21;
- minimum period of ordinary residence in Hong Kong increased from 3 to 7 years;
- all residents were eligible for suffrage regardless of nationalities; and
- the 23 criteria for registering as voters in Urban Council elections abolished.

The electorate and turnout of selected Urban Council elections after the expansion of electoral franchise are as follows:

Year	Number of registered voters	Number of registered voters who voted in the election	Turnout in contested elections (%)	Percentage of those eligible to vote (%)
1983	708,119	127,206	22.4	7.8
1986	944,844	218,573	23.1	12.5
1989	1,045,073	105,826	14.2	6.4
1991	1,124,292	214,544	20.9	10.8

Changes to the electoral system of unofficial members in the Urban Council are outlined as follows:

Period	Voting system	Number of constituencies	Total number of Elected seats	Proportion of Elected seats in UrbCo
1888-1936	First-past-the-post voting and plurality-at-large voting	1 constituency	2 seats	18.2-20%
1936-1940	First-past-the-post voting and plurality-at-large voting	1 constituency	2 seats	15.4%
1952	plurality-at-large voting	1 constituency	2 seats	15.4%
1953-1955	plurality-at-large voting	1 constituency	4 seats	27.7%
1956-1971	plurality-at-large voting	1 constituency	8 seats	36.4%
1973-1981	plurality-at-large voting	1 constituency	12 seats	50%
1983-1986	First-past-the-post voting	15 constituencies	15 seats	50%
1989-1991	First-past-the-post voting	15 constituencies	15 seats	37.5%
1995	First-past-the-post voting	32 constituencies	32 seats	78%

== Duties and services ==
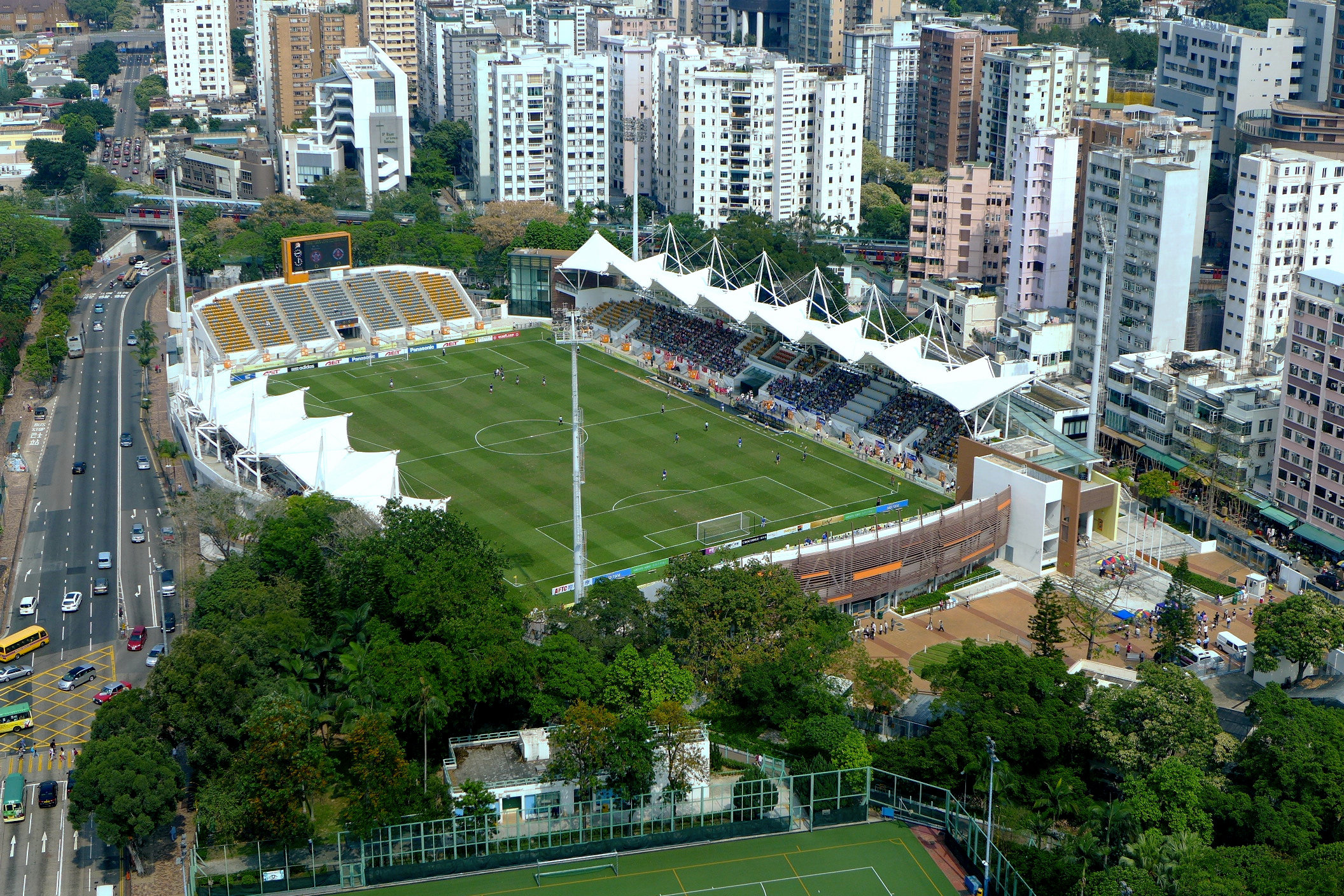
Mong Kok Stadium

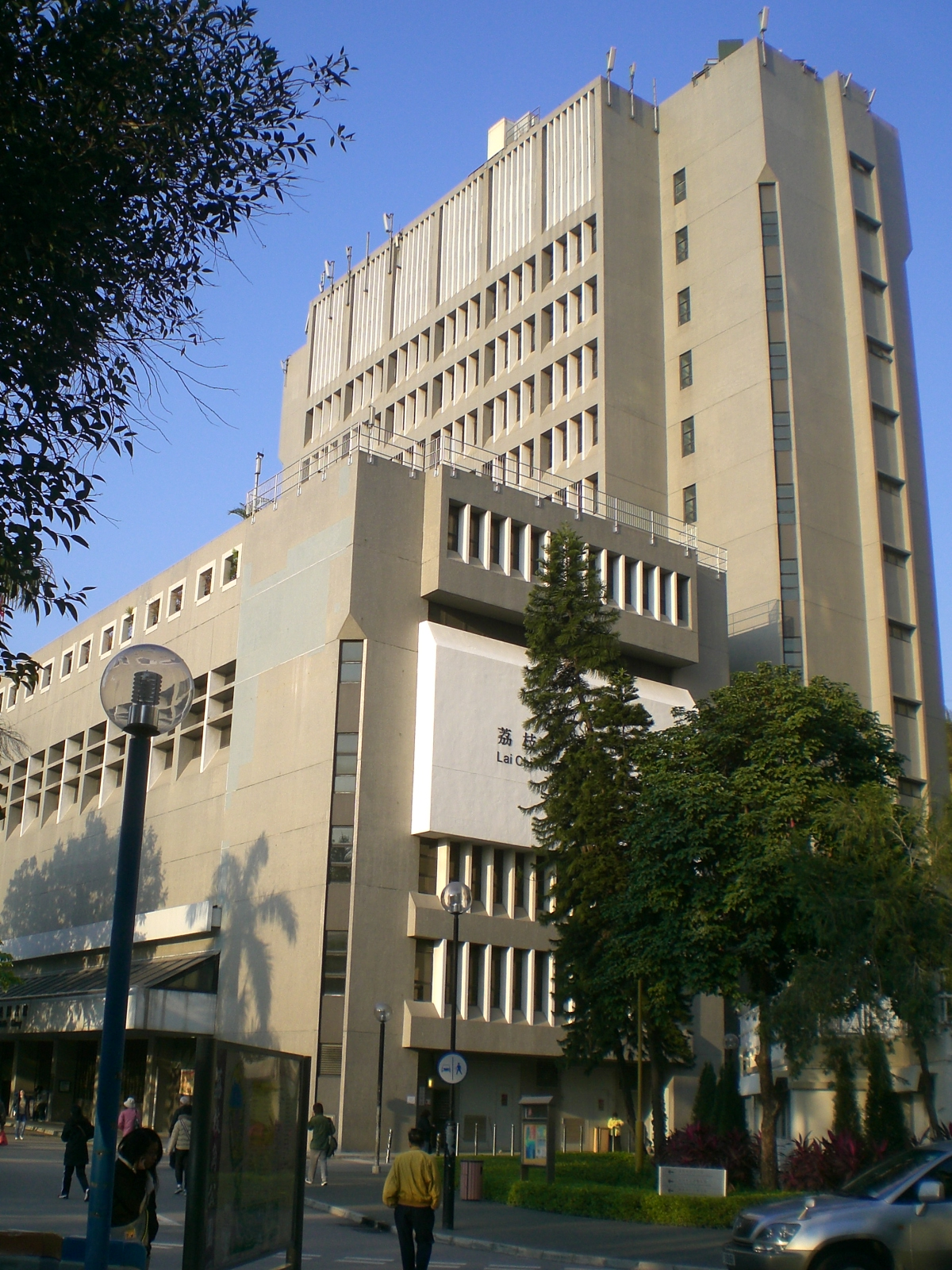
The former Urban Services Department Training School

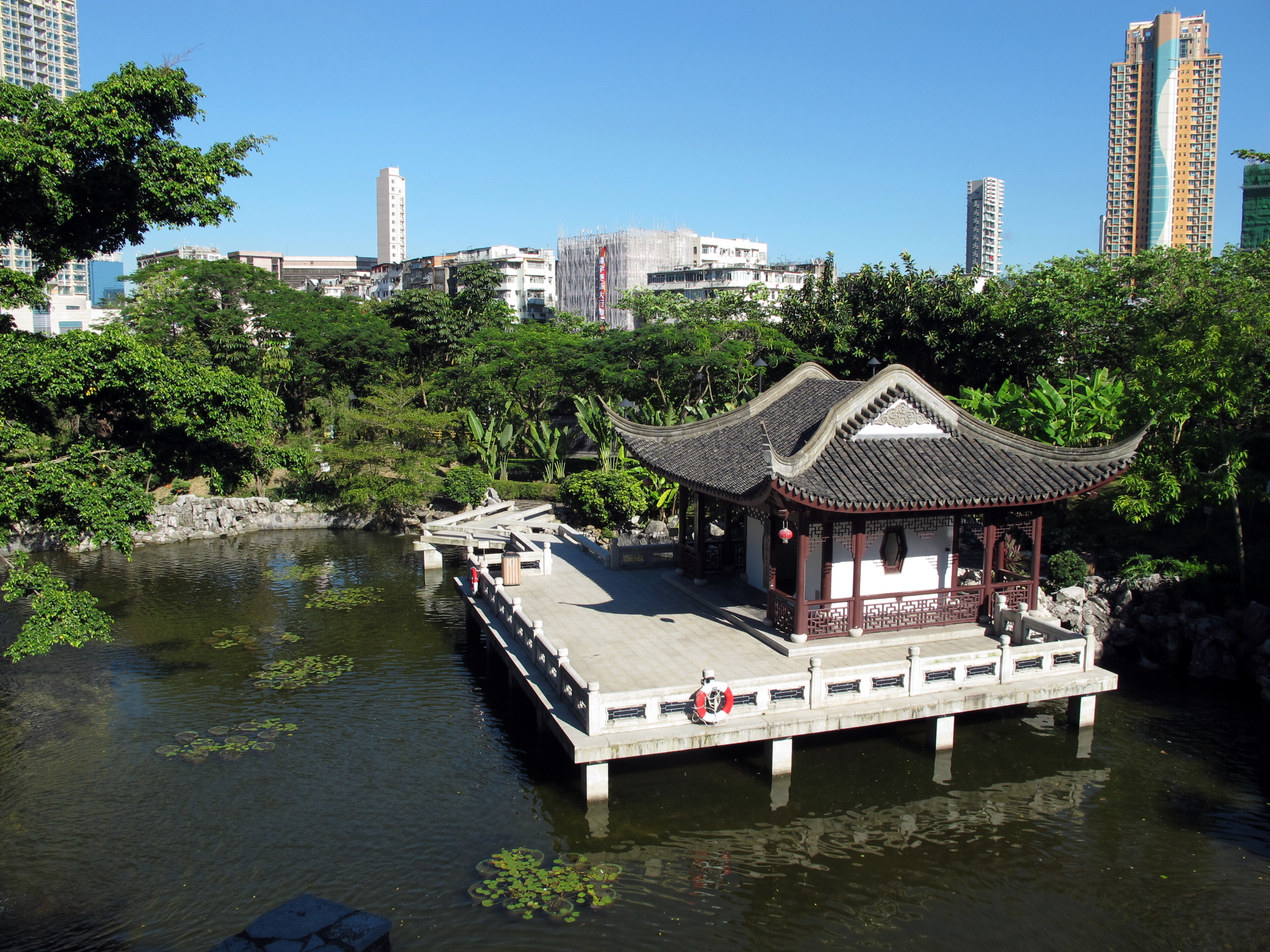
Kowloon Walled City Park

The Urban Council provided many services to the Hong Kong people over the years. The Urban Services Department was the executive branch of the council to implement policies and services. In 1997, it had about 16,000 employees, according to its published leaflet of 'service promises'.

The council's services included: recreational venues and activities, libraries, museums, cultural and entertainment venues, ticketing, wet markets, hawker registration and control, cremation, street cleansing, issuing licenses, and operating abattoirs.

=== Arts and culture ===
The Urban Council played a significant role in the artistic and cultural development of Hong Kong.

It also managed the Urban Council Public Libraries system in Hong Kong Island and Kowloon which, upon the dissolution of the municipal councils, was merged with the Regional Council Public Libraries to form Hong Kong Public Libraries.

==== Cultural events ====
The Council held the Festival of Asian Arts every year since 1976. The council also sponsored the International Film Festival, which took place annually mid-year and which gave Hong Kong people a rare chance to see a range of international film making, as well as Chinese films. The Independent Short Film and Video Awards were founded in 1993.

==== Museums ====
The Hong Kong Museum of Art regularly exhibits Chinese and Western art and frequently arranges art exchanges with overseas countries. The Hong Kong Museum of History, once housed in Kowloon Park, records local history and oral tradition. It is now located at Chatham Road in Tsim Sha Tsui. The Hong Kong Space Museum presents shows in the Space Theatre and exhibitions on astronomy, nature and space exploration with IMAX techniques.

==== Arts groups ====
The Council directly financed and often even managed many local arts groups. In 1983, at "An Evening With the Council's Performing Companies" – one of the events in the Urban Council Centenary Celebration – the then-council chairman Hilton Cheong-Leen said, "Together with the Government, the Urban Council is committed to the development of the arts in Hong Kong. We aim to do so at the professional level so that gifted Hong Kong citizens can develop their artistic potential. We also aim to make available to all members of the community a wide range of artistic performance for their enjoyment and appreciation. And in the not too distant future we hope to see Hong Kong recognised as a major international centre of the performing arts."

The Hong Kong Chinese Orchestra was established in 1977, under direct financial support and management by the Urban Council.

The Hong Kong Repertory Theatre was also founded in 1977 and was directly financed and administered by the Urban Council. It aims to promote and raise the standards of the theatrical "stage play" drama in Cantonese in the territory with professional actors, directors, playwrights, administration, training and production.

The Hong Kong Dance Company was established in May 1981, and was at one time directly administered by the Urban Council. It aims to combine classical and folk traditions of China with contemporary international awareness. These groups were later taken over by the Leisure and Cultural Services Department when the Urban Council was dissolved. In 2001, the groups were privatised and became limited companies, but still receive funding from the government.

=== Recreation and sport ===
The Council operated sports grounds, parks, indoor games halls, and public swimming pools.

=== Sanitation ===
The council was responsible for street cleansing, refuse collection, and pest control. It operated refuse collection points, public toilets and bathhouses, and was responsible for rubbish bins throughout the urban area. It was also responsible for the control of hawkers, issuing hawker licences and operating hawker bazaars.

== Demise ==
In early 1997, chief executive-designate Tung Chee-hwa announced that the two municipal councils would be disbanded on 1 July 1997 (the Handover) and replaced by two provisional councils, with members appointed by the government, that would serve until elections in 1999. Tung said that those reappointed must "love China [and] love Hong Kong" and refused to clarify whether democratic politicians met this definition. The announcement caused a row at the Urban Council and was unpopular with the public. Likewise, the pre-handover government opposed China's decision to disband the two councils and the 18 district boards, and to reintroduce appointed seats, which had been abolished under democratic reforms.

The Provisional Legislative Council met in May 1997 and drafted new legislation that would allow the chief executive-designate to appoint members to the new provisional bodies. Three bills re-introducing appointed seats to the post-Handover municipal councils and district boards were passed by the provisional legislature on 7 June 1997. The Urban Council, Regional Council and District Boards (Amendment) Bills 1997 stipulated that Tung Chee-hwa could appoint no more than 50 seats to the provisional municipal councils. Frederick Fung, chairman of the ADPL, called the bills a "retrogression of democracy" while Chan Kam-lam of the pro-Beijing DAB claimed that "elections were divisive and appointments would stabilise the community". Also on 1 July, elements of the Urban Council Ordinance and Regional Council Ordinance were repealed to allow the government to determine the composition and tenure of the councils.

After the Handover, the council was disbanded and replaced with the Provisional Urban Council, which comprised pre-Handover councillors plus new members appointed by the new government. The same was done with the Regional Council. The government then announced that the councils would be abolished in 1999. Both councils jointly objected to this plan, putting forward an alternative merger proposal entitled "One Council, One Department", which was not accepted by the government.

Both councils were dissolved on 31 December 1999 as planned. Within days of the dissolution of the Urban Council, its distinctive symbol was systematically removed from public sight, such as by pasting over it with paper on all litter bins and information boards. Shortly afterwards, all the litter bins were themselves discarded, replaced by a similar design, but in green rather than purple. Although the government had promised that some powers and duties of the Urban Council and Regional Council would be passed to the District Councils, in fact all were taken up by two newly created government departments: the Food and Environmental Hygiene Department and the Leisure and Cultural Services Department, along with the Home Affairs Department.

The archives of the two municipal councils are held by the Hong Kong Public Libraries, and are available online in digitised form.

== Lists of Chairmen ==
Before 1973, the chairmanship was occupied by the Director of Urban Services:

- A. de O. Sales, 1973–1981
- Hilton Cheong-Leen, 1981–1986
- H.M.G. Forsgate, 1986–1991
- Ronald Leung Ding-bong, 1991–1999

== See also ==
- Regional Council (Hong Kong)
- Taiwan Provincial Council
