= 26 blocks scandal =

Construction scandal in Hong Kong

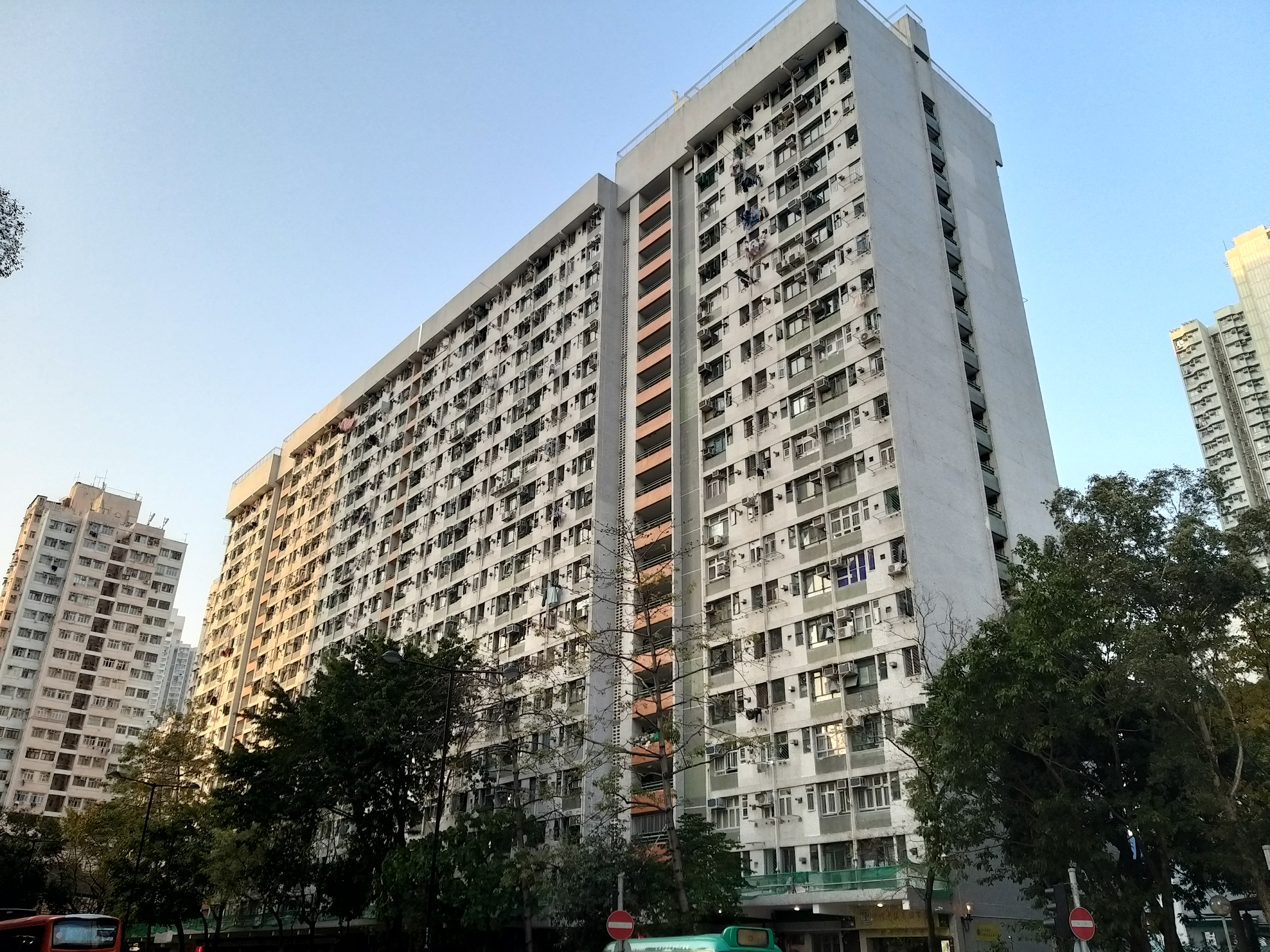
- Kwai Yan House (pictured in 2021) is rebuilt from Block 5 of Kwai Fong Estate, one of the first blocks embroiled in the scandal
- Native name: 廿六座問題公屋醜聞
- Date: 1980–1992
- Location: British Hong Kong
- Type: Construction scandal
- Cause: Jerry-building
- Outcome: 26 blocks of housing estate demolished
- Convicted: 2
- Charges: Bribery
- Verdict: Jail for 3 to 33 months

26 blocks scandal (Chinese: 廿六座問題公屋醜聞) was a construction scandal in British Hong Kong during the 1980s. A total of 577 blocks of public housing estate was discovered with structural problems, of those 26 were demolished due to the imminent risk of collapse.

== Events ==
In March 1980, blocks 5 and 6 of Kwai Fong Estate, built only eight years prior, were found to suffer from concrete spalling. Investigations concluded that jerry-building damaged the structure of the blocks, as the strength of concrete was significantly lower than the standard.

It is later revealed that, on 9 January 1982, the Independent Commission Against Corruption (ICAC) was told that the Kwai Fong Estate was marred by structural issues, such as concrete spalling off and water seepage from wall, with Block 6 as the most serious.

In 1982, Block 6 underwent complete repair whilst occupants were relocated to the Tai Wo Hau Estate in the same Tsuen Wan District, costing HK$50 million. Considering the cost-ineffectiveness and that the issue was quite common at that time, the Housing Department announced in January 1985 that Block 5 would become the first government-built low-cost housing block to be demolished, marking the start of the scandal.

The Government announced on 21 November 1985 that structural problems were found in a total of 577 blocks built between 1982 and 1984 and shall be repaired. 26 housing blocks and a school building were scheduled to be demolished as soon as possible due to the risk of collapse. The Extended Redevelopment Programme was launched in the same year to clear the sub-standard blocks. Tsuen Wan New Town was the most serious, with a total of 11 blocks demolished, impacting around 78,000 residents.

The ICAC decided to launch an investigation of bribery due to the scale of the scandal. The breakthrough of the probe came in 1987 after two criminals agreed to testify as witnesses. Three contractors along with seven current and former officials were charged with bribery. Two contractors were jailed for 33 months and 3 months (received suspended sentences) respectively.

== List of affected buildings ==
=== Demolished ASAP ===
Housing estate	Number of buildings	Built in	Demolished in	Notes
Tsz Man Estate	5	1966	1989	Two schools demolished due to structural connection
Kwai Fong Estate	4	1971	1987, 89	
Kwai Hing Estate	3	1971, 72	1988, 89	One other block demolished due to structural connection
Pak Tin Estate	3	1971, 72	1989	
Lam Tin Estate	3	1968, 69	1988, 91	Closed in 1989. Two schools, two blocks demolished due to structural connection
Shek Lei Estate	2	1966	1989	One other block demolished due to structural connection
Shek Lei Estate	1 (School)	1970	1989	Only school marked as dangerous
Kwai Shing East Estate	2	1973	1989	
Tsz Oi Estate	1	1964	1989	A school demolished due to structural connection
Sau Mau Ping Estate	1	1968	1991	Closed in 1988. Two blocks demolished due to structural connection
Shek Pai Wan Estate	1	1966	1988	
Wong Chuk Hang Estate	1	1973	1988	

=== Other affected buildings ===
26 blocks scandal (Hong Kong)

Housing estate	Block no.	Built in	Demolished in
Valley Road Estate	16	1964	2001, 02
Kwai Shing West Estate	8	1977	Not demolished
Yau Tong Estate	5	1971	1993
Lei Cheng Uk Estate	5	1955	1984
Lek Yuen Estate	5	1975	Not demolished
Tsz Lok Estate	3	1965	1990, 92
Hing Wah (II) Estate	3	1976	Not demolished
Wah Fu Estate	3	1968, 70	2031, 38 (expected)
Choi Wan (I) Estate	3	1980	Not demolished
Lai King Estate	3	1975	Not demolished
Lei Muk Shue Estate	2	1971, 72	1995, 2001
Tung Tau Estate	2	1965, 67	2003, 13
Oi Man Estate	1	1975	Not demolished
Nam Shan Estate	1	1979	Not demolished
Tai Hing Estate	1	1979	Not demolished
Fuk Loi Estate	1	1963	Not demolished
Kwai Hing Estate	1	1970	1992
Tsz Oi Estate	1	1966	1992
Mei Tung Estate	1	1974	2021

== Prosecution ==
Siu Hon-sum, then 62, owner of On Lee Siu Construction Limited, faced eight charges for bribing Lam Or-shum, a worker in the Works Branch five times from February 1970 to December 1973 with a total of HK$50,000 when Ho Man Tin Estate was under construction, and a surveyor in the Work Branch in December 1968 with HK$300 when Kwai Hing Estate was being built. Siu was jailed for 33 months and fined HK$325,000.

Ho Leung, then 70, former owner of Yeu Shing Construction Company Limited, was charged with bribing Lam six times from August 1966 to 1975 with a total of more than HK$45,000 during the construction of Ngau Tau Kok Estate and Lei Muk Shue Estate. Not being charged by ICAC for health problems, Ho testified as a witness, and died in 1991.

Poon Pak-shing, former manager of Great Vast Construction Engineering Limited, faced charges over bribing Lam in 1965 and 1966 with HK$4,000 when building Upper Ngau Tau Kok Estate. Poon was handed three-month jail and suspended for a year, and fined HK$4,000.

Tam Wing-han, former deputy clerk of work in the Works Branch, was found not guilty over receiving bribery. Six government-employed worker, including four retired, were arrested but were not brought to court.

== Aftermath ==
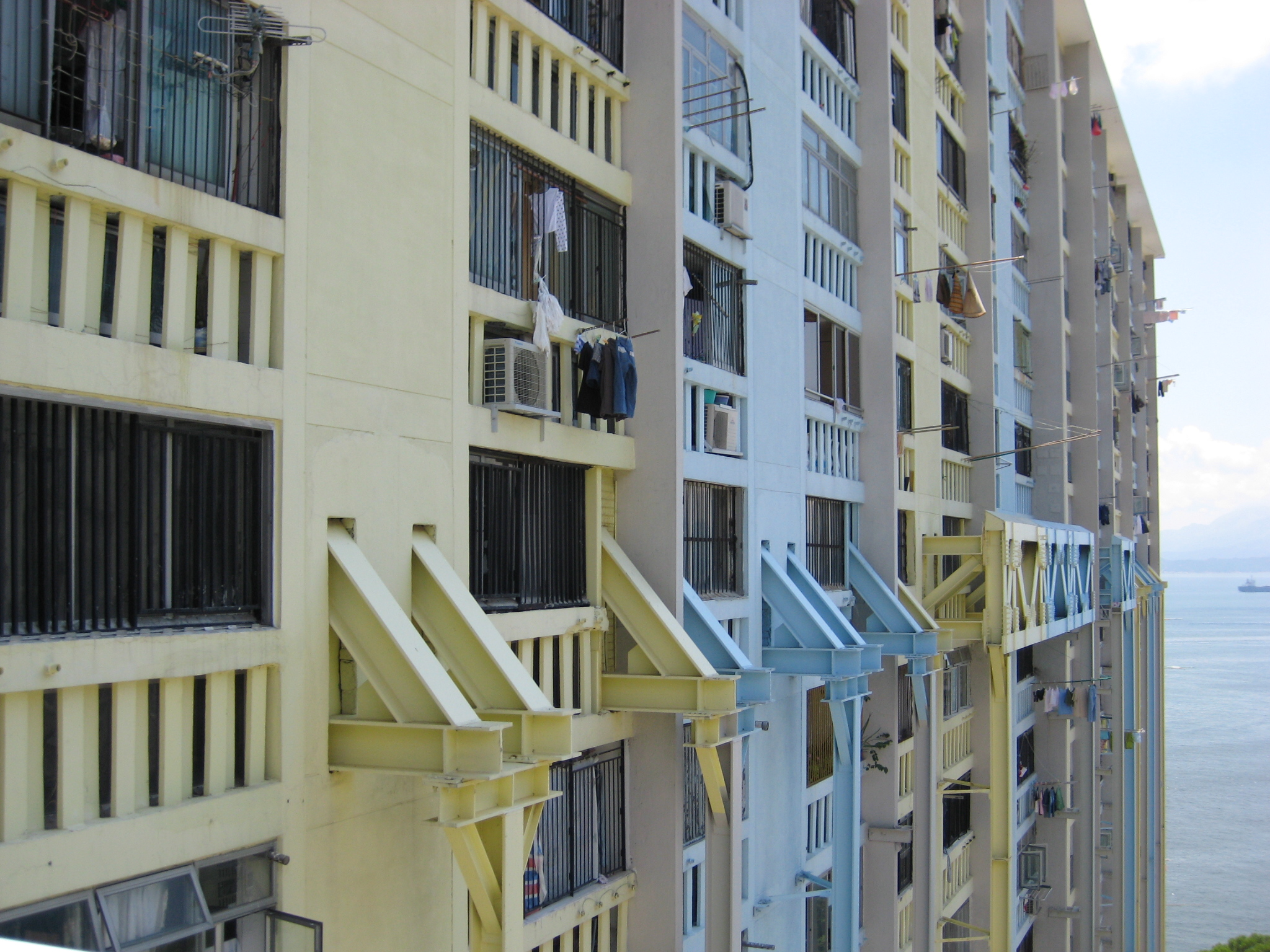
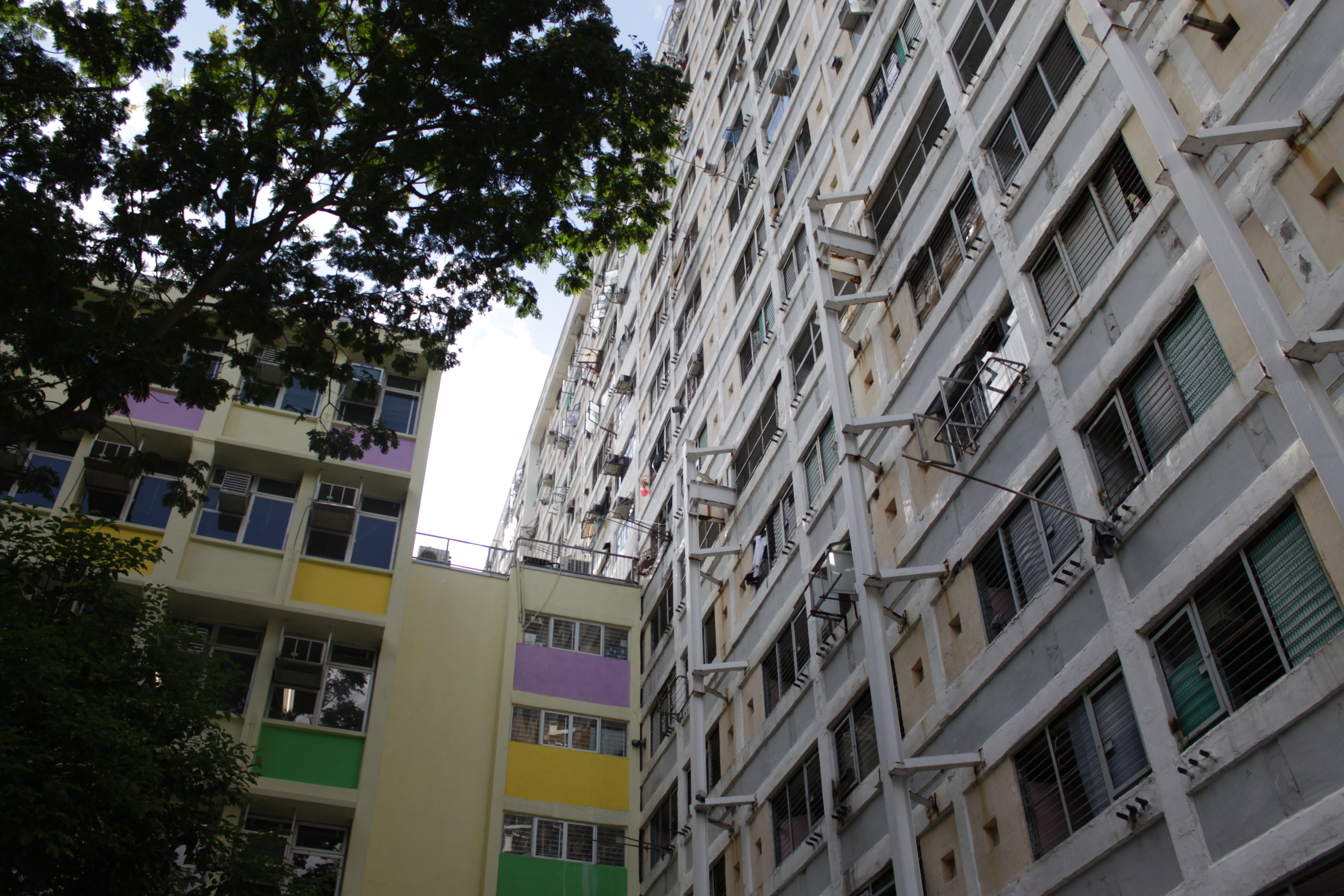
Stabilisation works in Wah Fu Estate (left) and Tung Tau Estate (right)

The authorities graded the problematic buildings into four riskiness levels. 26 blocks, found to have imminent risk of collapse and far from the safety standard, were demolished. For the other 551 buildings, some were carried out with stabilisation works. Nevertheless, the Executive Council decided in 1987 that all Resettlement Area and Low Cost Housing blocks were to be knocked down and rebuilt by 2001. The long-term housing strategy, named Comprehensive Redevelopment Programme, was completed in 2010 upon the clearance of Lower Ngau Tau Kok (II) Estate.
