= Tung Tau Estate =

Public housing estate in Kowloon, Hong Kong

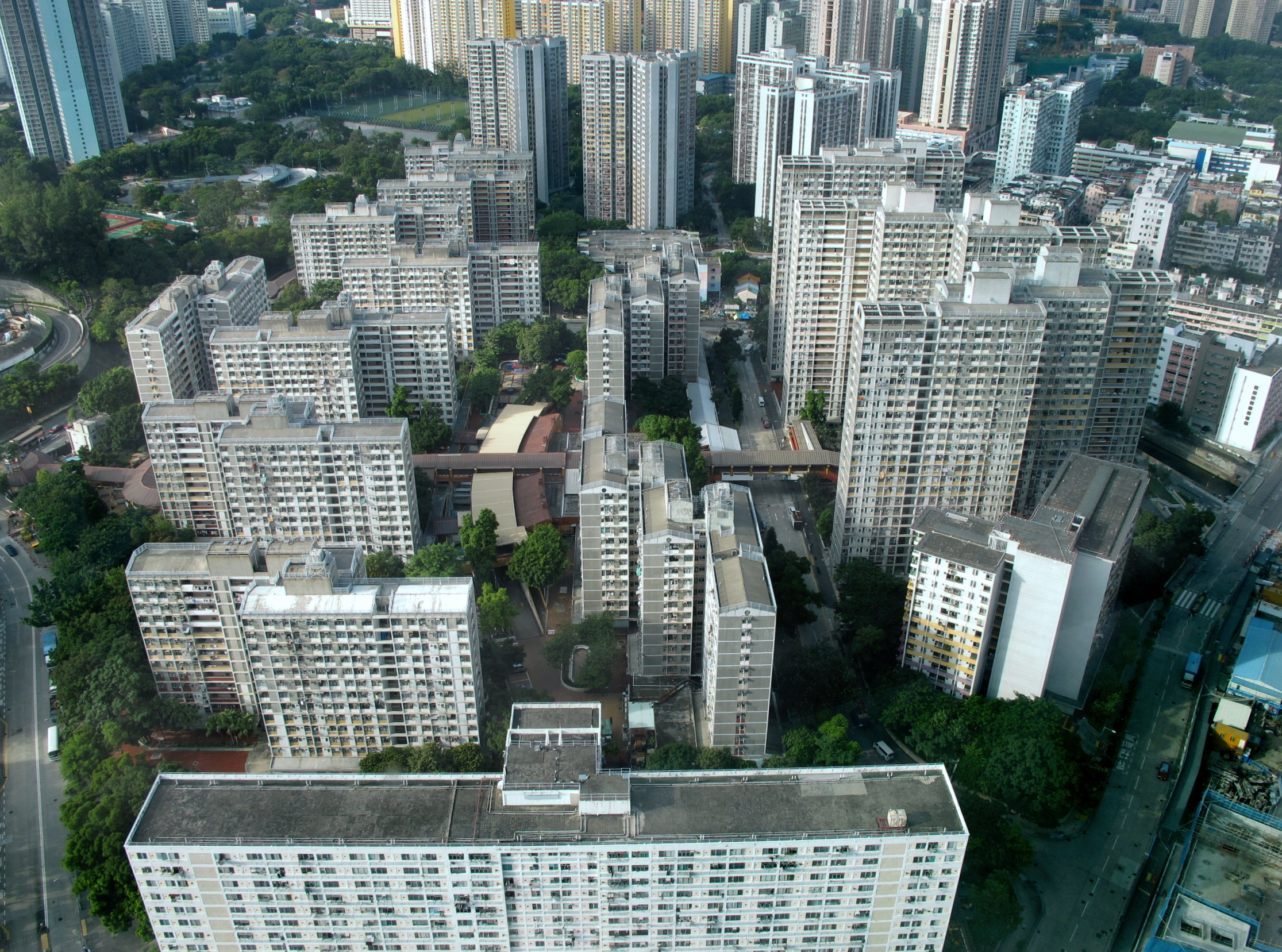
- Aerial view of Tung Tau Estate. The long building in the foreground, Block 22, has since been demolished.
- Interactive map of Tung Tau Estate

General information
- Location: 183 Tung Tau Tsuen Road, Wong Tai Sin; Kowloon, Hong Kong
- Coordinates: 22.3334°N 114.1924°E
- Status: Complete
- Category: Public rental housing, Tenants Purchase Scheme
- Population: 15,562 (2016)
- No. of blocks: 20

Tung Tau Estate (Chinese: 東頭邨) is a public housing estate and Tenants Purchase Scheme estate in the south of Wong Tai Sin, located between San Po Kong and Kowloon City, in Hong Kong. It was first built in the 1960s as resettlement housing, but has since been reconstructed.

It was divided into Tung Tau (I) Estate (東頭(一)邨) and Tung Tau (II) Estate (東頭(二)邨). The sole remaining housing block of Tung Tau (I) Estate was subsequently demolished. Tung Tau (II) Estate has 20 blocks built during the redevelopment in the 1980s and the 1990s.

== Background ==
In the 1960s, Tung Tau Estate was built as a resettlement estate which had a total of 23 blocks (21 Mark II and two Mark IV blocks). Mark II blocks were rudimentary structures built to fulfil emergency housing needs, while the other two blocks were of the Old Slab typology. The 21 Mark II blocks of Tung Tau Estate housed approximately 49,200 people in 7,750 households, as well as around 586 shops.

All 21 Mark II blocks were demolished to make way for 20 new blocks in the 1980s and the 1990s. In 2002, some of the flats on the estate (except Block 22) were sold to tenants through the Tenants Purchase Scheme Phase 5.

The two remaining resettlement-era blocks, numbered 22 and 23, were redeveloped later. Block 23 was demolished in 2003. That site was redeveloped as a separate housing estate, Tung Wui Estate, composed of two housing blocks and a community centre. The new estate began accepting residents in 2012.

Block 22, built in 1965 and housing 906 domestic flats, was subject to structural investigations by the Housing Department in 2007. The block required costly repairs, and it was decided to redevelop the site instead. Block 22 was the sole remaining block of Tung Tau (I) Estate. Po Yan Oblate Primary School, which was connected to Block 22 but in good structural condition, was retained. The site of Block 22, like that of Block 23, has been incorporated into the new Tung Wui Estate, and a new housing block (Wui Chi House) has been built there.

== Houses ==
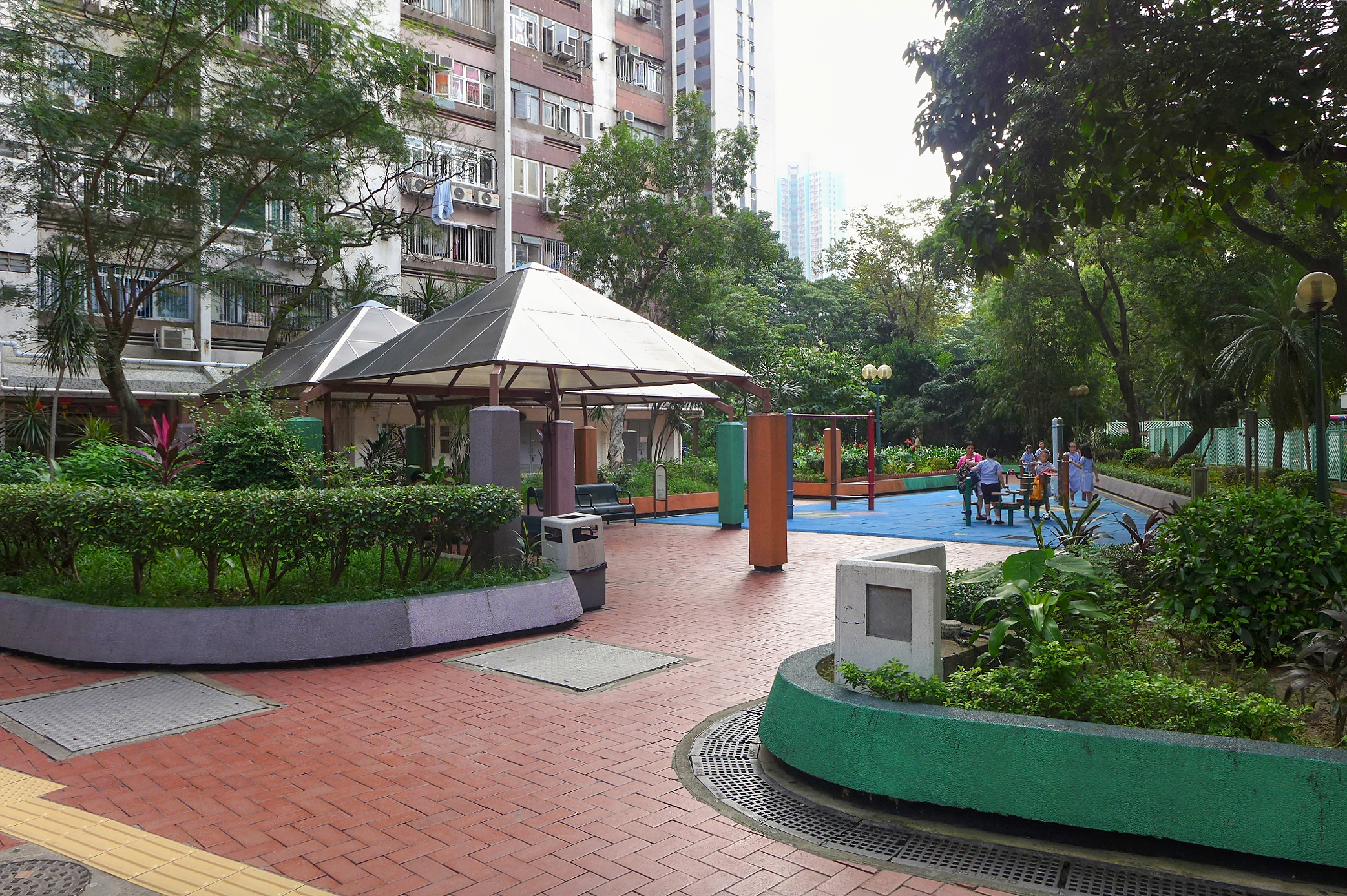
Open space

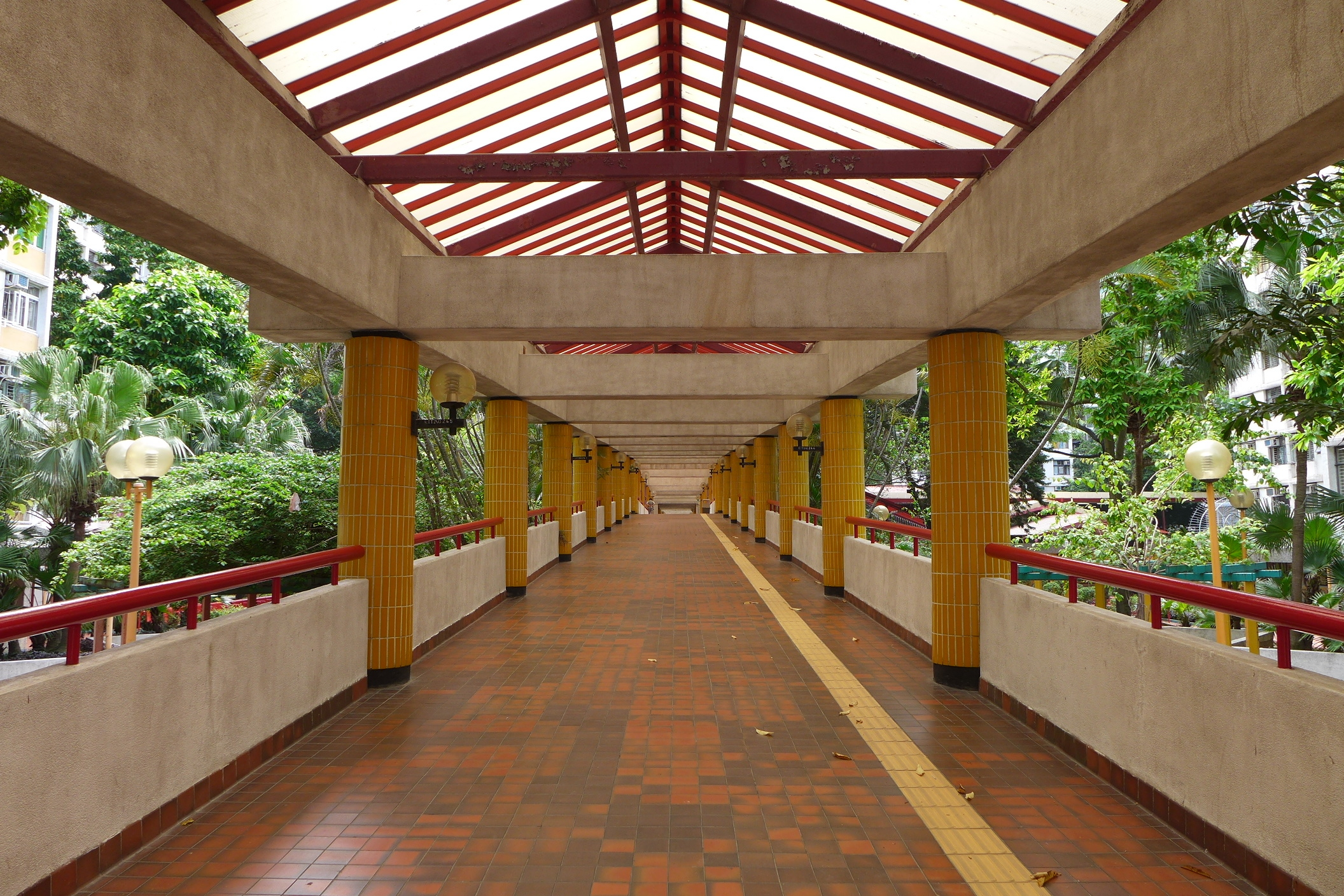
Covered walkway

Name	Type	Completion
Hong Tung House	Old Slab	1981
Yue Tung House	Single H	1982
Yiu Tung House	Single H	1985
Fu Tung House	Double H	1985
Tai Tung House	Double H	1985
Wong Tung House	Linear 3	1987
Hing Tung House	Linear 3	1992
Cheung Tung House	Linear 3	1992
On Tung House	Linear 3	1992
Choi Tung House	Linear 1	1992
Yan Tung House	Linear 1	1988
Yat Tung House	Linear 1	1988
Ying Tung House	Linear 1	1988
Shing Tung House	Linear 1	1988
Mau Tung House	Linear 1	1988
Wai Tung House	Linear 1	1990
Wing Tung House	Linear 1	1990
Pak Tung House	Linear 1	1990
Chun Tung House	Trident 4	1991
Kwai Tung House	Trident 4	1991

== Demographics ==
According to the 2016 by-census, the estate had a population of 15,562. The median age was 51.4. Over 97 per cent of residents were of Chinese ethnicity. The dominant spoken language was Cantonese.

== Politics ==
Locally, the estate is represented on Wong Tai Sin District Council. It falls within two constituencies:

- Tung Tau constituency comprises the southern part of the estate, Tung Wui Estate, and some other neighbouring buildings. Since the 2019 election, it has been represented by Hiroko Wan Chi-chung of People Power.
- Tung Mei constituency principally comprises the northern part of Tung Tau Estate and nearby Mei Tung Estate. Since 2015, it has been represented by Sze Tak-loy of the ADPL.

In the Legislative Council, Tung Tau Estate falls within the Kowloon East geographic constituency, which elects five members to the council.
