= Tsz Wan East (constituency) =

- 慈雲東
- Elected constituency for the Wong Tai Sin District Council
- Boundary of Tsz Wan East in Wong Tai Sin District
- District: Wong Tai Sin
- Legislative Council constituency: Kowloon Central
- Population: 20,644 (2019)
- Electorate: 11,433 (2019)

Current constituency
- Created: 1999
- Number of members: One
- Member: (Vacant)

Tsz Wan East
- Traditional Chinese: 慈雲東
Transcriptions
Yue: Cantonese
- Yale Romanization: Chìh wàhn dūng
- Jyutping: Ci4 wan4 dung1

Tsz Wan East is one of the 25 constituencies in the Wong Tai Sin District in Hong Kong.

The constituency returns one district councillor to the Wong Tai Sin District Council, with an election every four years. The seat was held by Mok Yee-ha.

Tsz Wan East constituency is loosely based on the Tsz Hong Estate, Tsz Man Estate and part of the Tsz On Court in Tsz Wan Shan with an estimated population of 20,124.

== Councillors represented ==
Election	Member	Party
1999	Michael Cheng Tak-kin	Progressive Alliance
2005	Michael Cheng Tak-kin	DAB
2007	Ken Ho Hon-man	DAB/FTU
2019	Mok Yee-ha→vacant	Independent democrat

== Election results ==
=== 2010s ===
Wong Tai Sin District Council Election, 2019: Tsz Wan East
Party	Candidate	Votes	%	±%
PfD	Mok Yee-ha	4,709	56.51	
DAB	Ken Ho Hon-man	3,624	43.49	−23.31
Majority		1,085	13.02	
Turnout		8,354	73.14	
PfD gain from DAB		Swing		

Wong Tai Sin District Council Election, 2015: Tsz Wan East
Party	Candidate	Votes	%	±%
DAB	Ken Ho Hon-man	3,192	66.8	
TWSCP	Tam Chun-man	1,585	33.2	
Majority		1,607	33.6	
Turnout		4,819	46.0	
DAB hold		Swing		

Wong Tai Sin District Council Election, 2011: Tsz Wan East
Party	Candidate	Votes	%	±%
DAB (FTU)	Ken Ho Hon-man	uncontested		
DAB hold		Swing		

=== 2000s ===
Wong Tai Sin District Council Election, 2007: Tsz Wan East
Party	Candidate	Votes	%	±%
DAB	Ken Ho Hon-man	3,069	64.7	
ADPL	Tsang Shuk-yi	1,675	35.3	
DAB hold		Swing		

Wong Tai Sin District Council Election, 2003: Tsz Wan East
Party	Candidate	Votes	%	±%
Independent (HKPA)	Michael Cheng Tak-kin	2,062	57.2	−19.2
Democratic	Susanna Wong Chor-shan	1,525	42.5	
Independent hold		Swing		

=== 1990s ===
Wong Tai Sin District Council Election, 1999: Tsz Wan East
Party	Candidate	Votes	%	±%
HKPA	Michael Cheng Tak-kin	1,680	76.4	
Independent	Fok Pui-yee	495	22.5	
HKPA win (new seat)				
