= Mok Ying-fan =

Mok Ying-fan 莫應帆

Member of the Provisional Legislative Council
- In office 21 December 1996 – 30 June 1998

Member of the Legislative Council
- In office 11 October 1995 – 30 June 1997
- Preceded by: Elsie Tu
- Constituency: Urban Council

Personal details
- Born: 15 January 1951 (age 75) Hong Kong
- Party: Association for Democracy and People's Livelihood
- Children: 1
- Education: Fudan College; Chinese Academy of Medicine
- Occupation: Chinese Herbalist

Mok Ying-fan (born 15 January 1951, Hong Kong) is the member of the Wong Tai Sin District Council (1985–91, 1994–2015) representing Tung Mei. He was the also member of the Urban Council (1989–99) and the member of Legislative Council (1995–97) representing for Urban Council constituency. He joined the Provisional Legislative Council which existed from 1996 to 98 with other members of the Association for Democracy and People's Livelihood, while other pro-democrats boycotted it.

Political offices
Preceded by Chung Hei-yin	Member of the Wong Tai Sin District Board; Representative for Tung Tau; 1985–1991	Succeeded by Fung Kwong-chung
Preceded by Fok Pui-yee	Member of the Urban Council; 1989–1999	Council abolished
New constituency	Member of the Wong Tai Sin District Council; Representative for Tung Mei; 1994–2015	Succeeded by Sze Tak-loy
Legislative Council of Hong Kong
Preceded by Elsie Tu	Member of Legislative Council; Representative for Urban Council; 1995–1997	Replaced by Provisional Legislative Council
New parliament	Member of Provisional Legislative Council; 1997–1998	Replaced by Legislative Council
