= Death of John MacLennan =

John MacLennan
- Born: 3 October 1950; Nigg, Highland, Scotland, United Kingdom
- Died: 15 January 1980 (aged 29); Ho Man Tin, Hong Kong
- Cause of death: Multiple gunshot suicide (apparent)
- Occupation: Inspector
- Known for: Death after charged with gross indecency

John MacLennan (Chinese: 麥樂倫; Jyutping: Mak6 Lok6 Leon4, 1950–1980) was a Scottish police officer in Hong Kong who had worked in a police unit involving homosexuals. His suspicious death in 1980 after being charged with gross indecency with a teenager drew public concern and turned into a cause célèbre, known as the MacLennan Affair, owing to his previous work in the police force, and eventually led to the decriminalisation of homosexuality in 1991.

== John MacLennan ==
John MacLennan was born on 3 October 1950 in Nigg, Highland of Scotland. He passed out of training in 1969 and, after three years in Stirling, joined the Hong Kong Police Force in 1973, stationing in Kwun Tong of East Kowloon.^{:1,7,30} Upon his request, MacLennan was transferred to the Special Branch in late 1976 as he was approaching the end of his two-and-a-half year contract. MacLennan was entrusted to, at first, vet the government servants, not long before he was given the lists of the government's known and suspected homosexuals, a task usually dedicated to expatriate inspectors. It was during that time he found the names of deputy police commissioner Roy Henry and head of Police Public Relations Wing Ron Redpath on the lists; the rumours did not cause harm to any of them. (Note: In 1966 it was claimed that there had been a homosexual ring involving numerous prominent Hong Kong citizens that could blow up a "political dynamite" if exposed.^{:46-48})^{:36-8,51}

MacLennan left the Hong Kong police force after receiving an offer from the Metropolitan Police in London. But just six months after back in the United Kingdom, MacLennan applied to rejoin Hong Kong's force, which was accepted for a second 2.5-year contract. MacLennan returned in March 1978 and this time he was posted to Yuen Long, a market town in the New Territories.^{:43-4,67}

== Arrest ==
MacLennan was known to take women, likely prostitutes, home overnight for sex, and had at least three long-term relationships with women. He had made homophobic remarks, declaiming that homosexuals should leave Hong Kong "because the law is the law". However, by 1975, he was sexually attracted to men and began to seek them out for sex. His senior superintendent at Special Branch was assured by MacLennan himself that he was not gay.^{:31-2,38}

In July 1978, MecLennan, accompanied by two expatriate inspectors, exchanged contact information with one of the local teens they met in Yuen Long, 18-year-old David Lau Wai-tong (劉偉堂). Lau alleged that MacLennan brought him to his police accommodation, and attempted to sexual assault him on bed. Some days later in August, Lau told his friend, a triad member, about the incident, whose father, an expelled station sergeant, reported it to the police. The case was taken seriously following the fallout of Richard Duffy, a prominent homosexual lawyer who was jailed for buggery. It was later seemed likely that the meeting was a set-up in order to get rid of MacLennan with his weak spot.^{:68-73}

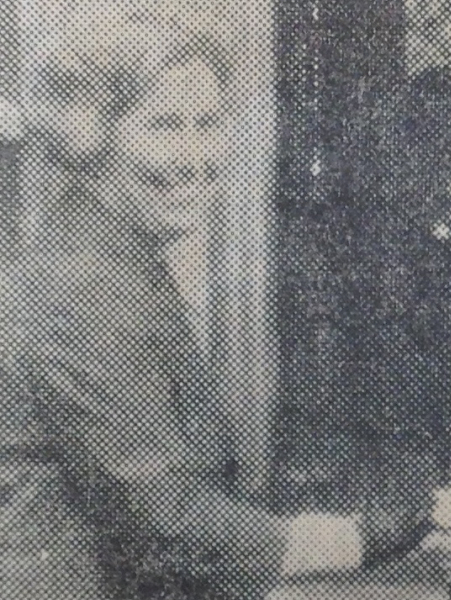
Elsie Elliott in 1966

MacLennan vehemently denied the allegations brought by Lau, and as MacLennan continued to portray his heterosexuality, his police friends also did not believe the accusations were authentic. The police agreed that there should be no prosecution due to insufficient evidence. Roy Henry, now the acting commissioner, surprisingly dismissed MacLennan without any chance of appeal.^{:70-3,77,113} It is believed that Henry act swiftly to avoid damaging his promotion to the commissionership given MacLennan's case could cast him, a closeted gay man, adversely.^{:83} MacLennan was informed of his dismissal on 20 November and immediately began fighting for his reinstatement. Soon after his petition, which was handled by his supporting acquaintances, reached Governor Murray MacLehose through prominent Legislative Council member Elsie Elliott, he was re-employed by the police force by 1 December, and deployed to Hung Hom.^{:84-5,89-93,111} According to police's intelligence file on MacLennan: "[MacLennan] claimed it was his clandestine knowledge of top homosexual personalities that had forced the Government to reinstate him [...] It is fairly apparent [...] that MacLennan is homosexual and was extremely fortunate to avoid prosecution in the original complaint."^{:149}

Meanwhile, the Special Investigations Unit (SIU), charged with the responsibility of investigating homosexuals by the new attorney general John Calvert Griffiths, started probing MacLennan, whom topped the list of SIU's targets. After police's pursuit and a failed attempt by colleagues to set up MacLennan, two male prostitutes were coerced into giving substantial statements against MacLennan, detailing their previous sexual encounters, apart from a police informant working in the gay circle. MacLennan was placed on the watch list in December 1979; by then MacLennan had been warned by the prostitutes that the SIU was attempting to charge him. On 3 January 1980 the attorney general instructed the prosecution of MacLennan with eight counts of gross indecency.^{:110-1,143-155,165}

== Death ==
Police quarter in Homantin

On 14 January 1980, MacLennan, knowing the SIU was after him, was forewarned by the divisional superintendent that he would be interviewed by the SIU on the next day, to which he stuttered in reply. MacLennan told his colleagues that he was persecuted for investigating senior officers and "queer hawks" during his time in Special Branch, and his lover that he was very frightened about it.^{:173-6}

At 6 a.m. on 15 January and at the Ho Man Tin police quarter, MacLennan drew a revolver and some .38 Long Colt ammunition. Sometime after 6 (likely between 6:30 and 7:30 a.m.), multiple gunshots were heard. MacLennan was found dead beside his bed, in his room that was locked and bolted from the inside, after 11:35 a.m. by the police inspectors who received orders and came to arrest him. A suicide note was found, signed by MacLennan at 6:10 a.m., that reads "please tell my family it was an accident and that I was a good Police Officer". The autopsy confirmed that he died of five gunshots to his chest.^{:177-83,190} MacLennan's ashes were flown to Scotland and interred in Fodderty Cemetery in Dingwall of Scottish Highland.^{:207}

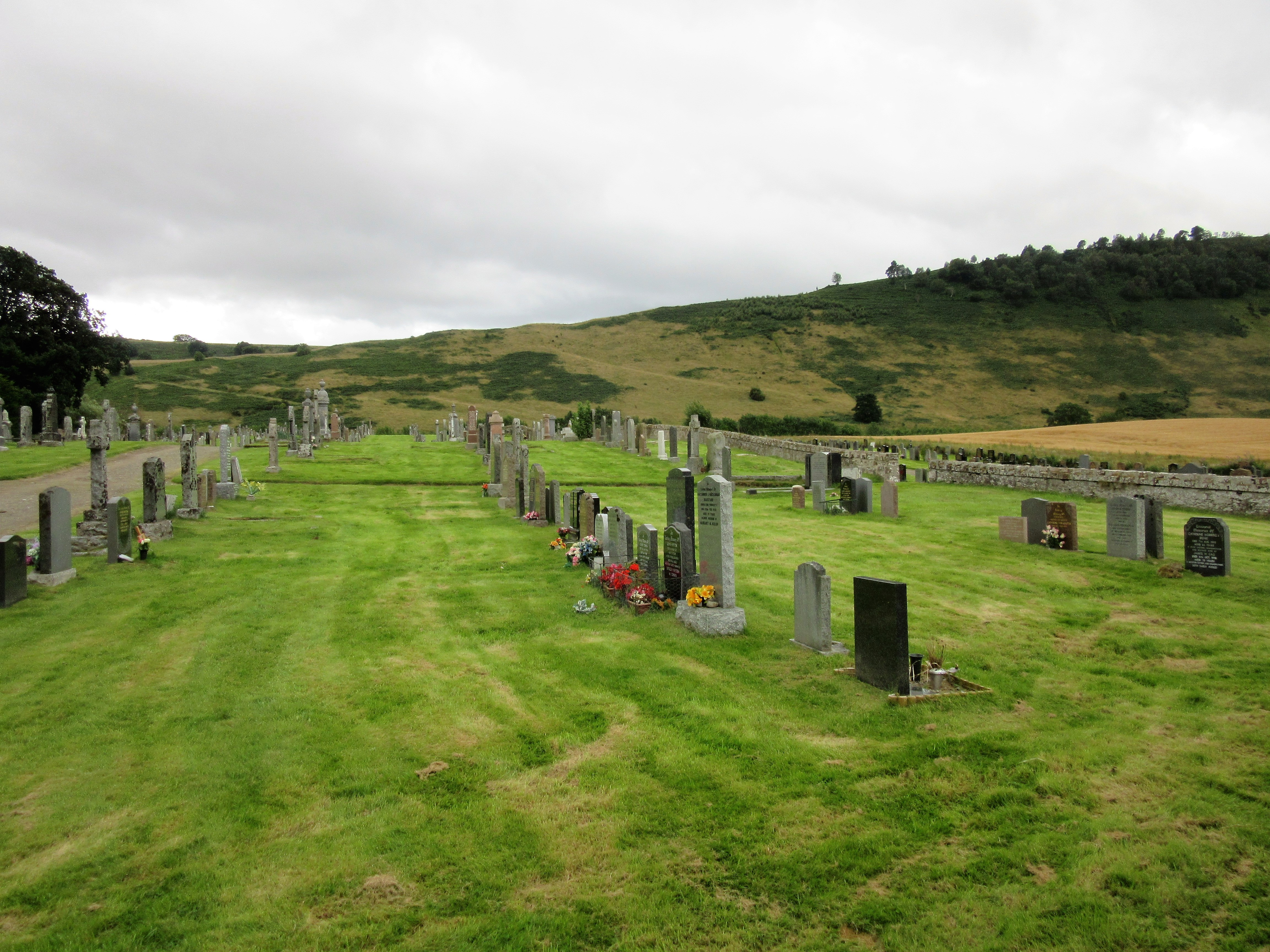
Fodderty Cemetery in Dingwall

== Reactions ==
The press quickly caught up the apparent suicide, and repeated in Scotland on the third day. Elliott denounced the "high-powered police frame-up" and disclaiming that MacLennan "may have been murdered" despite believing it to be a suicide. Rumours spread in Hong Kong that the police murdered or forced him to kill himself to cover up homosexuality within the senior police circle, which he may had knowledge of. One of the theories is that two triad members in the police force, both later murdered on separate occasions, killed MacLennan with four shots near the chest after he shot himself in the abdomen. As the police did not have standard protocols for investigating apparent suicide with multiple gunshots, the first responders did not collect adequate findings and therefore making it impossible to prove that MacLennan killed himself.^{:190-200,383}

The Coroner's Court opened an inquest into the death in late February. The government pathologist agreed the shots were consistent with self-inflicted wounds. The coroner asked the jury to decide whether it was a suicide, which he indicated his view to be so, or to return an open verdict. On 12 March, the three-jury panel sided with the latter by 2 to 1, and demanded reforming the laws on homosexuality while slamming the police handling of the death. Government's crown counsel concluded that the delay in the arrest, the lack of attention by MacLennan's superiors over access to a weapon, and the nervousness of chief inspector in his testimony accumulated into the jury's suspiciousness.^{:214-6}

As the witch-hunt against homosexuals damaged the police reputation and MacLennan's death turned into a cause célèbre, the governor was under increasing pressure to set up an inquiry, but he remained defiant in face of the request. On the other hand, Elliott and those who campaigned for an independent inquiry were intimidated. At a press conference on 23 May 1980, Griffiths said there was "overwhelming evidence" which shows that MacLennan committed suicide, confirmed that there is no reason to re-open the inquest, and announced he had asked the Law Reform Commission to conduct a review of the law on homosexuality.^{:205,216-20}

However his discussion of the details into the case and criticisms on the jury making wrong decisions arouse further public doubts and disquiet. With the public furore around the case still ongoing, and the growing interest from the Chinese community and British parliamentarians, the Governor-in-Council decided in July 1980 that a Commission of Inquiry would be established and chaired by judge Yang Ti-liang.^{:220-4,232-3}

== Independent inquiry ==
The hearing progressed slowly and dragged on for weeks. Intimidations against those investigating MacLennan's death continued, and a separate inquiry by Vincent Carratu, a private investigator, was forced to end after plausible interference by SIU. Following a 134-day hearing and costing HK$16 million, the most expensive public inquiry in Hong Kong, the report produced by the "Commission of Inquiry into Inspector MacLennan's Case" was published on 29 August 1981. The commission concurred that MacLennan committed suicide, due to imminent disclosure of his homosexual offences and the unbearable shame he would have to face. Yang was compelled that there could not have been another person in the flat. Yang reported that he found SIU's investigations proper except for some improprieties when questioning the male prostitutes, and rejected claims that MacLennan was being set up in Yuen Long or by SIU, or that he was harassed to death; rather, the Yuen Long incident was widely discussed among police officers and placed MacLennan caught the interest of very senior officers. He concluded that the "evidence against MacLennan was credible but improperly obtained".

The report did not bring anyone to account perhaps as a result of Governor's intervention. In the report Yang pointed to the "defects... in the nature of human frailty and errors" instead of a "defective system". He mildly criticised Roy Henry for his "administrative error" in firing MacLennan; the "error of judgement" by divisional superintendent for warning MacLennan of his arrest; and a senior police officer, who pushed for investigating MacLennan, for his strong prejudice against the victim. With harsher words, Yang considered Griffiths to be possibly misusing his power when he failed to react upon knowing the tactics deployed by the SIU, and making an error of judgement by challenging the Coroner's verdict. As for Elliott, Yang questioned her credibility, feeling that she tended to draw conclusions and make serious accusations too readily and to resort to emotive language.^{:342-9,359}

== Aftermath ==
The inquiry was not welcomed from both sides. The government refuted the criticisms laid in the report, and continued to back both Griffiths and Henry; the opposition thought of the report as a whitewash without many worthwhile conclusions. Elliott continued to attack the attorney general and considered wide deception and cover-up by the authorities remained in the MacLennan Affair. She and former army officer Nigel Collett believed MacLennan was "pushed into killing himself". No official or police officers was ever dismissed or sanctioned for their roles in the death.^{:336-7,375}

The SIU continued their campaign against homosexuals at a subtler scale and the government retained their discriminatory stance against homosexuals. Calls for decriminalising homosexual acts grew, as well as those opposing it.^{:368-72} In 1983, the Law Reform Commission made several recommendations including that "the law should not prohibit consensual sexual conduct in private between two males provided both are 21 or more years of age". The public debate flared up further, with the religious sectors leading the calls to stop decriminalisation effort, and majority of the Legislative Council remained defiant against decrminalise homosexual acts in 1987.

In 1990, the Legislative Council passed a motion by 31–13 supporting decriminalisation; Elliott, now known as Elsie Tu, was one of those voting yes. The government then drafted the Crimes (Amendment) Bill 1991 that lays out the framework of the proposal. Although the society generally reacted negatively to it, the government found it necessary as the penalties imposed on homosexuals could run contrary to the Bill of Rights. The bill was enacted in July 1991.

== See also ==
- LGBTQ rights in Hong Kong
- Edward Douglas-Scott-Montagu, 3rd Baron Montagu of Beaulieu, whose imprisonment led to decriminalisation of homosexuality in the United Kingdom
