= Urban Council (disambiguation) =

Urban Council may refer to:

Hong Kong

- Urban Council (Hong Kong)
- Urban Council (constituency)

Sri Lanka

- Urban councils of Sri Lanka

== See also ==
- City council
- Municipal council
