= Elsie Tu =

Hong Kong activist and politician (1913–2015)

The Honourable Elsie Tu CBE GBM

Member of the Legislative Council
- In office 22 September 1988 – 17 September 1995
- Preceded by: Hilton Cheong-Leen
- Succeeded by: Mok Ying-fan
- Constituency: Urban Council

Member of the Provisional Legislative Council
- In office 25 January 1997 – 30 June 1998

Member of the Urban Council
- In office 1 April 1963 – 31 March 1995
- Preceded by: Alison Bell
- Succeeded by: Szeto Wah
- Constituency: Kwun Tong West (1983–1995)

Personal details
- Born: Elsie Hume; 2 June 1913 Newcastle upon Tyne, England
- Died: 8 December 2015 (aged 102) Kwun Tong, Hong Kong
- Party: Reform Club (1963–1967)
- Spouses: William Elliott (m. 1946; div. 1964) Andrew Tu (m. 1985; died 2001)
- Education: Benwell Secondary Girls' School; Heaton Secondary School; Armstrong College, Durham University

Chinese name
- Traditional Chinese: 杜葉錫恩
- Simplified Chinese: 杜叶锡恩
Transcriptions
Standard Mandarin
- Hanyu Pinyin: Dù Yè Xí'ēn
Yue: Cantonese
- Yale Romanization: Douh Yihp Sek-yān
- Jyutping: Dou^{6} Jip^{6} Sek^{3}-jan^{1}

Elsie Tu CBE GBM (née Hume; Chinese: 杜葉錫恩; 2 June 1913 – 8 December 2015), known as Elsie Elliott in her earlier life, was a British-born Hong Kong social activist, elected member of the Urban Council of Hong Kong from 1963 to 1995, and member of the Legislative Council of Hong Kong from 1988 to 1995.

Born and raised in Newcastle upon Tyne, England, Tu moved to Hong Kong in 1951 following a period as a missionary in China. She became known for her strong antipathy towards colonialism and corruption, as well as for her work for the underprivileged. She took the main role in the 1966 Kowloon riots when she opposed the Star Ferry fare increase which later turned into riots and faced accusations of inciting the disorder. She fought for gay rights, better housing, welfare services, playgrounds, bus routes, hawker licences and innumerable other issues and her campaigning is credited with leading to the establishment of the Independent Commission Against Corruption (ICAC) in 1974.

In the run up to the 1997 handover of Hong Kong to China and the midst of the Sino-British conflict on the 1994 Hong Kong electoral reform, Tu found favour with the Chinese Communist authorities, and took a seat on the Beijing-controlled Provisional Legislative Council, from December 1996 to June 1998, after losing both her seats in the Urban and Legislative Councils in 1995 to another prominent democrat Szeto Wah. In post-1997 Hong Kong, although without a formal public role, Tu consistently supported the SAR government and policies including the controversial Basic Law Article 23 legislation. She died in Hong Kong on 8 December 2015, at the age of 102.

== Early life ==
Tu was born into the working-class family of John and Florence Hume on 2 June 1913 in Newcastle upon Tyne, the second child of four. After attending Benwell Secondary Girls' School and Heaton Secondary School, she went on to study at Armstrong College, a forerunner of Newcastle University, graduating in 1937 with a Bachelor of Arts. From 1937 to 1947 she was a schoolteacher in Halifax, where, during the Second World War, she was a Civil Defence volunteer.

Hume converted to Christianity in 1932 during her first year at university. In 1946 she married William Elliott, and went with him to China as a missionary with an organisation called the Christian Missions in Many Lands in 1947, and stationed in Yifeng. Hume was among the last group of missionaries moving from Nanchang to Hong Kong after the Chinese Communist Party took power in 1949 and expelled all foreign missionaries from the mainland China. She lived in an illegal apartment in a squatter community in Wong Tai Sin area, known as Kai Tak New Village. She soon learned about corruption because squatters had to pay triad gangs protection money.

Shocked by the poverty and injustices there, and due to her sympathy for the situation of Hong Kong society, Elsie became disenchanted with her husband's rigid Protestant faith and the refusal of their church, the Plymouth Brethren, to become involved in social issues. Elsie left the Plymouth Brethren when she stood up in the assembly in Hong Kong in 1955. She returned to Hong Kong alone to carry on her education work. She divorced her husband and lived for a time in a kitchen in a Kowloon Walled City tenement.

In 1954, she founded and worked in Mu Kuang English School for poor children in an old army tent at a squatter area near Kai Tak. She started with 30 pupils in the tent. For a year, she lived on little else but bread and water until being employed at the Hong Kong Baptist College, teaching English, English literature and French. She also met her colleague, Andrew Tu Hsueh-kwei in the school, who became her husband 30 years later. The Mu Kuang English School is now situated on Kung Lok Road in Kwun Tong, serving 1,300 children of Hong Kong's low-income families. She remained as the school principal until 2000.

== Political career ==
=== Early involvement ===
Elliott was shocked by the injustices she perceived in Hong Kong when she first arrived. However, her church did not permit social activism. After she left the church, she felt like she was "starting [her] new life at the age of 43, with a mission on earth for human beings, and not mansion in heaven for [her]self." She wrote to The Guardian, deploring the long working hours, low wages and primitive working conditions experienced by Chinese people in Hong Kong. Her letter was quoted during debate in the UK Parliament. A controversy ensued, resulting in labour reform in Hong Kong. Elliott was also appalled to find child labour officially recognised and accepted in Hong Kong.

=== Urban Councillor ===
Becoming politically active, Elliott was elected for the first time to the Urban Council in 1963, a body dealing with local district matters such as public health, recreation, culture, food hygiene, hawking and markets. Its membership was partially publicly elected and partially appointed. It was also the only elected office in the colony at the time. Brook Bernacchi's Reform Club was seeking a woman candidate and Elliott ran. At that time, the Reform Club and the Civic Association, the two quasi-opposition parties in the Urban Council formed a join ticket for the four seats in the council to push for constitutional reform in the colony. She later left the club and ran as an independent in the re-election in 1967. One of the prerequisites for becoming an Urban Councillor at that time was a knowledge of English, the only official language. Elliott thought this unfair and lobbied, with Councillor Denny Huang and others, for years to have Chinese recognised as an official language.

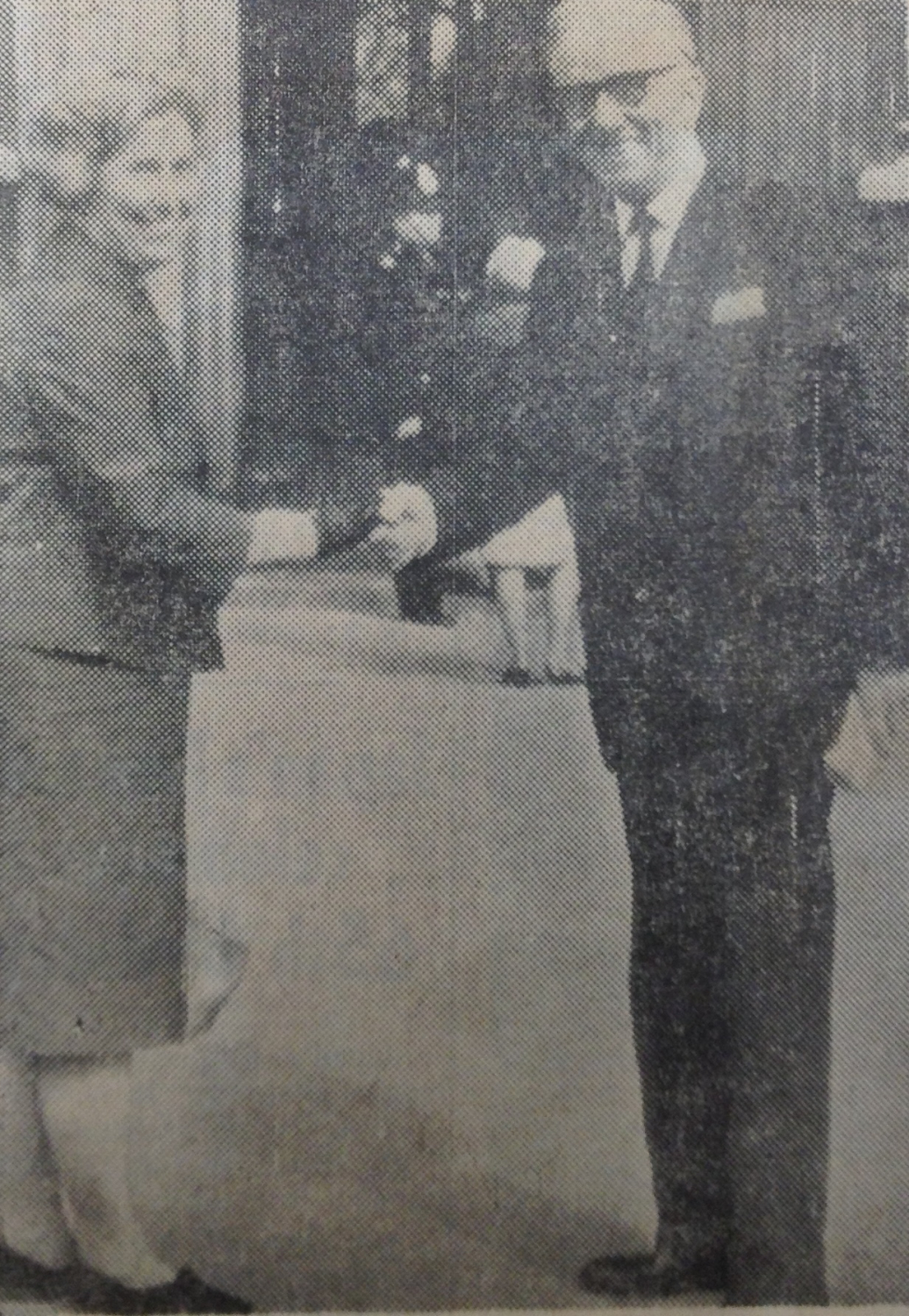
Elliott meeting with Labour MP John Rankin during her delegation to London in May 1966.

Elliott became vice-chairman of the Urban Council with Gerry Forsgate as chairman in 1986. Until her defeat in 1995, she had always been re-elected to the Urban Council with the highest votes. She was also the spokeswoman for the United Nations Association of Hong Kong, which advocated self-government in the colony in the 1960s. In 1966, Elliott went to London and met with politicians including Secretary of State for the Colonies Frederick Lee and Members of Parliament, seeking a Royal Commission of Inquiry into Hong Kong on the colony's economic inequality, corruption in the colonial government and self-government for Hong Kong as seen in other British colonies. She also invited some Members of Parliament to visit Hong Kong and joined the delegations of elected Urban Councillors to London in 1979 to discuss the proposed constitutional changes for Hong Kong.

Around 1981, when District Boards were set up, Urban Councillors were appointed ex-officio members of the Boards. Consequently, Elliott was member of the Kwun Tong District Board until the appointment system was abolished in 1991.

=== Social activism ===
From the 1960s to 1980s, Elliott fought for gay rights, better housing, welfare services, playgrounds, bus routes, hawker licences and innumerable other issues. She was especially opposed to the corruption then endemic in many areas of Hong Kong life and the influence of the triads. Her popularity grew as did her reputation as fighter for the underprivileged and outspoken critic of British colonial rule.

In 1954, the government issued a new policy which allowed the Squatter Control Branch to demolish new squatter huts where many newcoming refugees from mainland China were living. Elliott thought that the policy carried out many unjust practices and corruption. She called for a review of the policy once she was elected to the Urban Council in 1963 and helped the homeless and filed complaints to the government officials. Eventually the government agreed that the squatters whose huts were demolished in Jordan Valley could build huts on the nearby hilltop known as "Seventh Cemetery".

In 1965, the Star Ferry applied to the Government for a First Class fare increase of 5 Hong Kong cents to 25 cents. This was widely opposed in Hong Kong. Elliott collected over 20,000 signatories opposing the plan, and flew to London in an attempt to arrest it. The increase in fare was approved in March 1966 by the Transport Advisory Committee, where the only vote opposing was Elliott's. Inspired by Elliot's actions, on 4 April 1966, a young man named So Sau-chung began a hunger strike protest at the Star Ferry Terminal in Central with his black jacket upon which he had hand-written the words "Hail Elsie", "Join hunger strike to block fare increase". So was soon arrested and more protests were sparked which eventually turned into the Kowloon riots in April 1966. Elliott faced smear attacks from the pro-government media and was called to an official inquiry, portraying her as the instigator of the riots and naming it the "Elliott riot".

At the time street hawkers generally had to pay protection money to triads, a portion of which went to the police. She strove for the institution of hawking control measures to combat these ills. Though many in ruling circles disliked Elliott rocking the boat, her campaigning is credited with leading to the establishment of the Independent Commission Against Corruption (ICAC) in 1974 by Governor Murray MacLehose who pushed forward massive reforms to the colonial system. Minibus drivers in the 1970s had to pay extortion money in order to avoid receiving summonses. She reported these minibus rackets and allegations of police corruption to Peter Fitzroy Godber, the Chief Superintendent of the Traffic Department, Governor Murray MacLehose, the Traffic Commissioner of Traffic Department, Colonial Secretary, and G. A. Harknett, the Director of Operations of ICAC in various letters. She also helped Mak Pui-yuen who was believed to have been victimised for having reported corruption to Police Inspectors J. Peter Law and Peter Fitzroy Godber about a minibus racket in 1970.

In 1979, Elliott and Andrew Tu, a social activist whom she later married, formed the Association for the Promotion of Public Justice (APPJ) to promote social justice, stability and prosperity. In 1982, the APPJ Filipino Overseas Workers Group was established to help Filipino domestic helpers in Hong Kong on human rights issues.

Elliott fought for gay rights. She urged the government to decriminalise homosexuality, as had been done in the United Kingdom in 1967, but was told that the locals would object. She appealed directly to Governor MacLehose, who also supported gay rights, but he echoed the same sentiment that the community would oppose decriminalisation. In September 1979 she appealed to Sir Yuet-keung Kan, but he and others continued to block reform. Homosexuality was eventually decriminalised in Hong Kong in 1991, although there are still no laws against discrimination on the basis of sexual orientation.

In January 1980, John MacLennan, a police inspector, was found shot five times in the chest and body in his locked flat on the day he was to have been arrested on homosexual charges. Elliott suggested that MacLennan was being persecuted because he "knew too much" about the names of homosexuals in his investigation of homosexuality in the police. As a result, Elliott corresponded with Murray MacLehose, Commissioner of the Commission of Inquiry and MacLennan's family, J. M. Duffy, the Senior Crown Counsel, John C. Griffiths, the Attorney General and also collected information on MacLennan's case as well as the Inquest and Inquiry. The event led to the setting up of the Commission of Inquiry and a review of the laws on homosexuality.

In 1980 it was revealed by investigative journalist Duncan Campbell that she was under surveillance by the Standing Committee on Pressure Groups (SCOPG). This, however, did not worry Elliott as she stated: "I know my telephone was tapped and probably is at this moment but I have done nothing wrong and have no political affiliations." Later, Tu wrote in her semi-autobiographical work, Colonial Hong Kong in the Eyes of Elsie Tu, that her phone line was already tapped in 1970.

=== Before and after 1997 ===
Tu was appointed as a HKSAR Basic Law Consultative Committee member in 1985 before the handover. In 1985 as the colonial government introduced indirect election to the Legislative Council for the first time in history, the Urban Council became an electoral college, and the Urban Councillors could elect a representative to the Legislative Council. At the next election in 1988 she was first elected to the Legislative Council through the constituency and served for two terms until 1995. From 1991 to 1995 she chaired the House Committee in the legislature. She remained the most popular legislator for most of her tenure.

In the period leading up to Hong Kong's return to Chinese sovereignty, Tu became an advocate of slower pace in democratisation as preferred by the Chinese government, which markets it as "gradual pace", as opposed to many democrats who advocate faster-pace democratisation such as Emily Lau and Martin Lee. She opposed the last Governor Chris Patten's electoral reform, questioning the British refusal to give Hong Kong democracy for decades but then advancing such reforms only in the final years of its "disgraceful colonial era" in which Hong Kong "never had any democracy to destroy". She attacked Governor Chris Patten as a hypocrite.

In the Urban Council election in March 1995, she lost her seat after 32 years of service to Democratic Party politician Szeto Wah, whose campaign targeted Tu's perceived pro-Beijing stance, by a margin of 2,397 votes. In the Legislative Council election held September in the same year, she left her Urban Council constituency and went for the Kowloon East direct election but was defeated by Szeto Wah again. As she ran against the pro-democracy icon, Tu was supported by the pro-Beijing party Democratic Alliance for the Betterment of Hong Kong (DAB), which made her look even closer to Beijing.

Tu was appointed by the Beijing government to the Selection Committee, which was responsible for electing the first Chief Executive and the Provisional Legislative Council, established in 1996 to straddle the 1997 handover in which Tu served as a member. Tu's political career came to an end when the Provisional Legislative Council was dissolved in 1998. In response to her opponents' criticisms of her being increasingly pro-Beijing, she said "I'm not for China, I'm not for Britain. I've always been for the people of Hong Kong and for justice. I will do the work I've always done and stand for the people who get a raw deal."

== Retirement and death ==
Tu left active politics and closed her office in 1998 but continued to comment on social issues and turned in articles to newspapers to criticise government policies she deemed unfair or inadequate. She remained, as one Hong Kong commentator put it, "the pro-Beijing camp's only worthy, authentic, popular hero".

In 2002, she wrote to the Legislative Council in support of enactment of the anti-subversion law under Basic Law Article 23. The controversy over Article 23 sparked the 1 July Protest of 2003 with a record turnout of more than 500,000 demonstrators. The legislation had been promoted by Regina Ip, Secretary for Security. When the latter ran in the 2007 Legislative Council by-election against democrat Anson Chan who was the former Chief Secretary for Administration, Tu publicly endorsed the Beijing-supported Ip.

In 2013, she criticised the widening income disparity in Hong Kong and "rich men who seem to have no conscience", expressing sympathy for striking dock workers against billionaire Li Ka-shing's Hutchison Whampoa.

Tu turned 100 in June 2013. For her 100th birthday, Mu Kuang alumni established the Elsie Tu Education Fund in her honour. She died from pneumonia-related complications at the Kwun Tong United Christian Hospital on 8 December 2015, aged 102. All three Chief Executives Leung Chun-ying and his two predecessors Tung Chee-hwa and Donald Tsang were among the pallbearers at the funeral of Tu on 20 December. A cremation ceremony was held at the Cape Collinson Crematorium in Chai Wan after the funeral and Tu's ashes were buried with the remains of her husband, Andrew Tu.

== Family and marriages ==
Tu's father, John Hume, originally a grocer's assistant, was sent to fight in the First World War in Europe when she was one. He was gassed in the trenches and suffered as a result for the rest of his life. Tu noted that her father had a profound influence on her conscience when he told her his experiences during the war. He had a hatred of war and compassion for all people. He became an agnostic and interested in politics. Her family discussed about the hypocrisy of religions, about Marxism and the rights of workers and about sports. Her left-leaning world-view influenced by her father made Tu decided that "I could at least be good and useful in life" in her youth. Her father died when she was in China.

Elsie married William Elliott who was eight years her junior, and worked in the Plymouth Brethren missionary group in 1946. She went with her husband to China in 1947, but became increasingly disillusioned with her husband's fundamentalism and their church. She described the period as "the lowest point in [her] life" and thought of committing suicide. The couple eventually separated during an abortive trip back to England. She returned to Hong Kong alone and later divorced him in 1964.

Back in Hong Kong she met her second husband, Andrew Tu Hsueh-kwei, who had come to Hong Kong from Inner Mongolia in the 1950s. They became working partners at the Mu Kuang English School, with Andrew teaching the Chinese language and Elliott teaching all other Form 1 subjects. In spite of cultural and language differences, she found that Andrew's ideas took her back to the days of sharing with her father. In 1985, 30 years after the two teachers met, they finally got married when Elsie was 71 and Andrew was 63. The couple remained married until Andrew died in 2001. Andrew was also a social activist and the leader of the Chinese Alliance for Commemoration of the Sino-Japanese War Victims, which demands justice, reparations and apologies for the victims suffered in the Second Sino-Japanese War from the Japanese government.

== Works ==
Tu wrote two volumes of autobiography, as well as other works. Colonial Hong Kong in the Eyes of Elsie Tu was published in 2003 and Shouting at the Mountain: A Hong Kong Story of Love and Commitment, cowritten with Andrew Tu, tells of the couple's lives dedicated to society. It was completed after Andrew Tu's death in 2001 and published in 2005. She also completed the publication of her husband Andrew's autobiography of his childhood in Inner Mongolia, Camel Bells in the Windy Desert.

== Legacy ==
Tu was seen as the champion who fought for the underprivileged and against corruption back in the 1960s. Chief Executive Leung Chun-ying praised her "passion and devotion to Hong Kong and her tremendous contributions to social reform and development" in a statement after her death. Chief Secretary Carrie Lam said her acquaintance with Tu started in her university days when she was a student participating in social actions led by Tu, who she described as an exemplary champion of social justice who commanded respect for her valiant words and deeds.

Founding chairman of the Democratic Party Martin Lee praised her as a pioneer in fighting for democracy. Other democrats such as Lau Chin-shek, Lee Wing-tat, Fred Li Wah-ming and Frederick Fung admitted their involvement in social activism was inspired or assisted by Elsie Tu.

== Awards ==
Tu received numerous honours in recognition of her services to Hong Kong. In 1975, she was awarded the Ramon Magsaysay Award for Government Service. She was made a Commander of the Order of the British Empire (CBE) in 1977 for her work against corruption. In 1997, she was among the first recipients of the Grand Bauhinia Medal (GBM), the highest honour in the SAR award system.

A number of honorary degrees were also conferred on her. She received an honorary doctoral degree in Social Science from the University of Hong Kong in 1988 and both honorary doctoral degrees in Laws from the Hong Kong Polytechnic University and in Social Science from the Open Learning Institute of Hong Kong in 1994. From Armstrong College (later to become Newcastle University) of Durham University where she graduated, she received honorary doctoral degrees in Civil Law in 1996 from both universities.

== See also ==
- List of centenarians

== Additional Sources ==
Books

- Elliott, Elsie (1971). The Avarice, Bureaucracy and Corruption of Hong Kong.
- Elliott, Elsie (1981). Crusade For Justice: An Autobiography.
- Tu, Elsie (2003). Colonial Hong Kong in the Eyes of Elsie Tu. Hong Kong: Hong Kong University Press. ISBN 978-962-209-606-6.
- Tu, Elsie; Tu, Andrew (2005). Shouting at the Mountain: A Hong Kong Story of Love and Commitment.
- Urban Council, Urban Council Annual Report, 1974

Political offices
Preceded by Alison Bell	Member of Urban Council; 1963–1995	Succeeded by Szeto Wah
Legislative Council of Hong Kong
Preceded by Hilton Cheong-Leen	Member of Legislative Council; Representative for Urban Council; 1988–1995	Succeeded by Mok Ying-fan
Preceded by Allen Lee as Senior Member	Chairman of House Committee; 1991–1995	Succeeded by Leong Che-hung
New parliament	Member of Provisional Legislative Council; 1997–1998	Replaced by Legislative Council
