= Ambrose Cheung =

Hong Kong businessman and solicitor

Ambrose Cheung BBS, JP
- 張永森
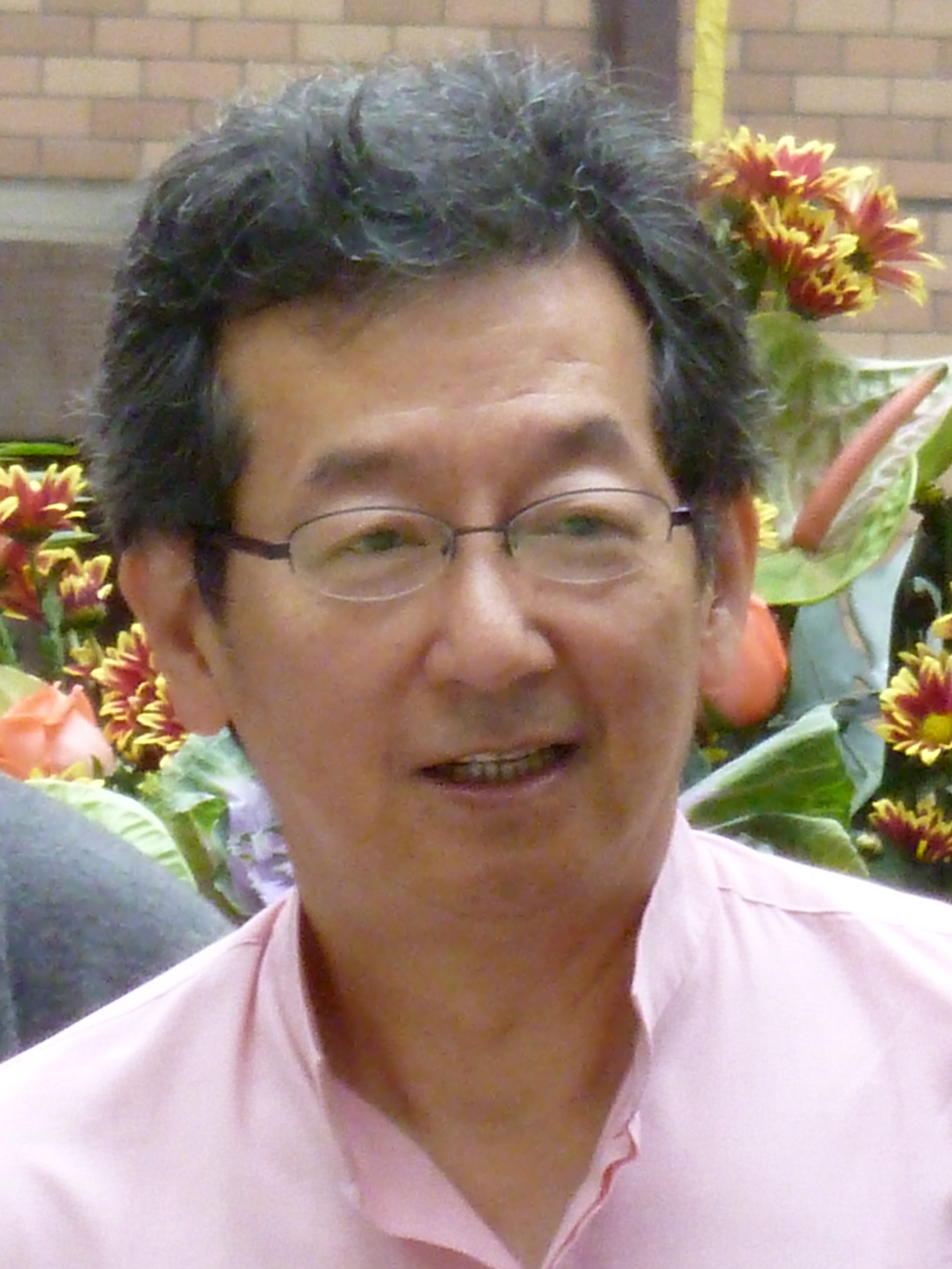
- Cheung in 2014

Member of the Legislative Council
- In office 1 July 1998 – 30 December 1999
- Constituency: Urban Council

Chairman of the Sham Shui Po District Council
- In office 1 January 2016 – 31 December 2019
- Preceded by: Jimmy Kwok
- Succeeded by: Yeung Yuk

Personal details
- Born: 10 January 1951 (age 75) Hong Kong
- Party: Liberal Party (1993–94)
- Education: University of Hong Kong
- Occupation: Lawyer; Company Director

Ambrose Cheung Wing-sum, BBS, JP (Chinese: 張永森; born 10 January 1951) is a businessman, solicitor and is a former member of the Legislative Council of Hong Kong in 1998–2000 for the Urban Council constituency and incumbent Sham Shui Po District Council (Mei Foo North constituency) from 1982 to 2019 and chairman of the Sham Shui Po District Council between 2016 and 2019.

== Biography ==
Cheung was born in Hong Kong in 1951. After Cheung obtained his bachelor's degree of Social Sciences form the University of Hong Kong in 1973, he joined the Standard Chartered Bank and was sent to the London headquarters and European branches for a year. He resigned from the bank to studied law in London and returned to Hong Kong in 1981.

He was first appointed to the Sham Shui Po District Board in 1982 and has been held the office since. He has continuously been running for the office since the 1985 District Board elections. He was member of the Urban Council and was elected to the Legislative Council of Hong Kong by all the Urban Councillors in 1998 LegCo election through the Urban Council constituency. In 1999, as the representative of the Urban Council in the legislature, Cheung resigned from the LegCo post to protest government's decision of abolishing the two municipal councils.

Cheung was member of the Liberal Party but soon quit the party after its bad performance in the 1994 District Board elections, stating his disappointment to the party's lack of commitment to the local development.

In 2016, he was elected chairman of the Sham Shui Po District Council.

Political offices
New constituency	Member of Sham Shui Po District Board; Representative for Lai Wan; 1985–1994	Constituency abolished
New constituency	Member of Sham Shui Po District Board; Representative for Ching Lai; 1994–2003	Constituency abolished
Preceded by Ma Lee-wo	Member of Urban Council; Representative for Sham Shui Po West; 1995–1999	Council abolished
New constituency	Member of Sham Shui Po District Council; Representative for Mei Foo North; 2004–2019	Succeeded by Joshua Li
Preceded by Jimmy Kwok	Chairman of Sham Shui Po District Council; 2016–2019	Succeeded by Yeung Yuk
Legislative Council of Hong Kong
New parliament	Member of the Legislative Council; Representative for Urban Council; 1998–1999	Constituency abolished
