= Commissions of Inquiry =

Hong Kong statutory commissions

Commissions of Inquiry (Chinese: 調查委員會; also known as 獨立調查委員會) are appointed by the Chief Executive of Hong Kong together with the Executive Council under Commissions of Inquiry Ordinance (Chapter 86) of Hong Kong law. Within the terms of reference set by the Chief Executive-in-Council, the commissioners may investigate the operation or management of any public body, the conduct of any public officer, or any matter it considers to be of significant public concern.

By convention, a commission of inquiry is generally chaired by a serving or retired judge. The commission has the statutory powers to obtain documents and records and the authority to summon witnesses. It also provides legal protection and legal immunity to witnesses. As its investigative procedures constitute a judicial process under this authorization, any actions obstructing the commission's inquiry are regarded as contempt of court.

During the British colonial period, the Governor in Council invoked the Commissioners Powers Ordinance to establish thirteen Commissions of Inquiry. Since the handover of Hong Kong in 1997, the Hong Kong SAR Government has established five such commissions, which investigated the 1998 opening chaos at Hong Kong International Airport, the 2007 Hong Kong Institute of Education controversy, the 2012 Lamma Island ferry collision, the 2015 incidents of lead in drinking water and the 2018 Shatin to Central Link Project corruption case.

== List ==
=== British Hong Kong ===
1. Commission of Inquiry into Kowloon Disturbances (3 May 1966)
2. Commission of Inquiry into the Collapse of Spectator Stand at Sek Kong (27 November 1968)
3. Commission of Inquiry into the Fire on the Jumbo Floating Restaurant (6 November 1971)
4. Commission of Inquiry into the Rainstorm Disasters (22 June 1972)
5. Commission of Inquiry into the Case of Peter Fitzroy Godber (13 June 1973)
6. Commission of Inquiry into the Ap Lei Chau Oil Spill (13 November 1973)
7. Commission of Inquiry into the Hong Kong Telephone Company Limited (21 February 1975; to examine the organisation of the company following mismanagement allegations)
8. Commission of Inquiry into the Leung Wing-sang Case (6 February 1976)
9. Commission of Inquiry into the Accident at Sek Kong Air Strip on 1 July 1977 (16 September 1977)
10. Commission of Inquiry into Inspector MacLennan's Case (8 July 1980)
11. Commission of Inquiry into the Lan Kwai Fong Disaster (1 January 1993; for the Lan Kwai Fong stampede)
12. Commission of Inquiry into Witness Protection (12 January 1993; concerning a death at a Vietnamese refugee detention centre)
13. Commission of Inquiry into the Garley Building Fire (17 December 1996)

=== Hong Kong SAR ===
1. Commission of Inquiry on the New Airport (21 July 1998)
2. Commission of Inquiry on Allegations relating to the Hong Kong Institute of Education (15 February 2007)
3. Commission of Inquiry into the Collision of Vessels near Lamma Island (22 October 2012)
4. Commission of Inquiry into Excess Lead Found in Drinking Water (13 August 2015)
5. Commission of Inquiry into the Construction Works at and near the Hung Hom Station Extension under the Shatin to Central Link Project (10 July 2018)
