= Tung Mei (constituency) =

Constituency in Wong Tai Sin District, Hong Kong

- 東美
- Elected constituency for the Wong Tai Sin District Council
- Boundary of Tung Mei in Wong Tai Sin District
- District: Wong Tai Sin
- Legislative Council constituency: Kowloon Central
- Population: 16,379 (2019)
- Electorate: 10,876 (2019)

Current constituency
- Created: 1994
- Number of members: One
- Member: (Vacant)

Tung Mei
- Traditional Chinese: 東美
Transcriptions
Yue: Cantonese
- Yale Romanization: Dūng méih
- Jyutping: Dung1 mei5

Tung Mei is one of the 25 constituencies in the Wong Tai Sin District in Hong Kong.

The constituency returns one district councillor to the Wong Tai Sin District Council, with an election every four years. The seat is held by Sze Tak-loy of the Association for Democracy and People's Livelihood.

Tung Mei constituency is loosely based on northern part of the Tung Tau Estate, Mei Tung Estate and Kai Tak Garden with an estimated population of 15,304.

== Councillors represented ==
| Election | Member | Party |
|---|---|---|
| 1994 | Mok Ying-fan | ADPL |
| 2015 | Sze Tak-loy | ADPL |
| 2019 | Sze Tak-loy | ADPL |

== Election results ==
=== 2010s ===
Wong Tai Sin District Council Election, 2019: Tung Mei
| Party | Candidate | Votes | % | ±% |
|---|---|---|---|---|
| ADPL | Sze Tak-loy | 4,854 | 67.72 | +3.32 |
| DAB | Yeung Kwong-fu | 2,314 | 32.28 | −3.32 |
| Majority | | 2,540 | 36.44 | |
| Turnout | | 7,185 | 66.09 | |
| ADPL hold | | Swing | | |

Wong Tai Sin District Council Election, 2015: Tung Mei
| Party | Candidate | Votes | % | ±% |
|---|---|---|---|---|
| ADPL | Sze Tak-loy | 2,894 | 64.4 | +10.5 |
| DAB | Wong Kwok-yan | 1,597 | 35.6 | –10.5 |
| Majority | | 1,297 | 18.8 | |
| Turnout | | 4,543 | 46.7 | |
| ADPL hold | | Swing | +10.5 | |

Wong Tai Sin District Council Election, 2011: Tung Mei
| Party | Candidate | Votes | % | ±% |
|---|---|---|---|---|
| ADPL | Mok Ying-fan | 1,878 | 53.9 | −19.9 |
| DAB (FTU) | Lam Man-fai | 1,607 | 46.1 | |
| ADPL hold | | Swing | | |

=== 2000s ===
Wong Tai Sin District Council Election, 2007: Tung Mei
| Party | Candidate | Votes | % | ±% |
|---|---|---|---|---|
| ADPL | Mok Ying-fan | 1,567 | 73.8 | |
| Independent | So Chiu-chau | 555 | 26.2 | |
| ADPL hold | | Swing | | |

Wong Tai Sin District Council Election, 2003: Tung Mei
| Party | Candidate | Votes | % | ±% |
|---|---|---|---|---|
| ADPL | Mok Ying-fan | uncontested | | |
| ADPL hold | | Swing | | |

=== 1990s ===
Wong Tai Sin District Council Election, 1999: Tung Mei
| Party | Candidate | Votes | % | ±% |
|---|---|---|---|---|
| ADPL | Mok Ying-fan | uncontested | | |
| ADPL hold | | Swing | | |

Wong Tai Sin District Board Election, 1994: Tung Mei
| Party | Candidate | Votes | % | ±% |
|---|---|---|---|---|
| ADPL | Mok Ying-fan | 2,069 | 75.6 | |
| Independent | Yung Wing-kei | 642 | 23.5 | |
| ADPL win (new seat) | | | | |
