= Mei Foo North (constituency) =

Hong Kong constituency

- Elected constituency for the Sham Shui Po District Council
- Boundary of Mei Foo North in Sham Shui Po District
- District: Sham Shui Po
- Legislative Council constituency: Kowloon West
- Population: 15,847 (2019)
- Electorate: 8,765 (2019)

Current constituency
- Created: 2003
- Number of members: One
- Member: Vacant
- Created from: Ching Lai

Mei Foo North, formerly called Ching Lai, is one of the 25 constituencies in the Sham Shui Po District. The constituency returns one district councillor to the Sham Shui Po District Council, with an election every four years.

Mei Foo North constituency is loosely based on the northern side of the Mei Foo Sun Chuen in Lai Chi Kok with estimated population of 15,847.

== Councillors represented ==
=== Ching Lai (1994–2003) ===
Election	Member	Party
1994	Ambrose Cheung Wing-sum	Liberal→Independent
1999	Ambrose Cheung Wing-sum	Independent
2003	Ambrose Cheung Wing-sum	Independent

=== Mei Foo North (2003 to present) ===
Election	Member	Party
2003	Ambrose Cheung Wing-sum	Independent
2007	Ambrose Cheung Wing-sum	Independent
2011	Ambrose Cheung Wing-sum	Independent
2015	Ambrose Cheung Wing-sum	Independent
2019	Joshua Li Chun-hei→Vacant	Civic→Independent

== Election results ==
=== 2010s ===
Sham Shui Po District Council Election, 2019: Mei Foo North
Party	Candidate	Votes	%	±%
Civic	Joshua Li Chun-hei	4,154	62.06	+21.26
Nonpartisan	Virginia Lee Wing-cheung	1,347	20.12	
Independent	Law Siu-yin	1,193	17.82	
Majority		2,807	41.94	
Turnout		6,722	76.70	
Civic gain from Independent		Swing		

Sham Shui Po District Council Election, 2015: Mei Foo North
Party	Candidate	Votes	%	±%
Independent	Ambrose Cheung Wing-sum	2,636	59.2	–10.7
Civic	Joshua Li Chun-hei	1,816	40.8	+10.7
Majority		820	18.4	
Turnout		4,478	55.6	
Independent hold		Swing	–10.7	

Sham Shui Po District Council Election, 2011: Mei Foo North
Party	Candidate	Votes	%	±%
Independent	Ambrose Cheung Wing-sum	2,204	69.9	
Civic	Alpha Keung Chung-yin	950	30.1	
Independent hold		Swing		

=== 2000s ===
Sham Shui Po District Council Election, 2007: Mei Foo North
Party	Candidate	Votes	%	±%
Independent	Ambrose Cheung Wing-sum	uncontested		
Independent hold		Swing		

Sham Shui Po District Council Election, 2003: Mei Foo North
Party	Candidate	Votes	%	±%
Independent	Ambrose Cheung Wing-sum	2,009	62.3	−18.3
Independent	Yam Siu-wai	1,217	37.7	
Independent hold		Swing		

=== 1990s ===
Sham Shui Po District Council Election, 1999: Ching Lai
Party	Candidate	Votes	%	±%
Independent	Ambrose Cheung Wing-sum	2,142	80.6	
Democratic	Chan Kwan-chiu	491	18.5	
Independent hold		Swing		

Sham Shui Po District Board Election, 1994: Ching Lai
Party	Candidate	Votes	%	±%
Liberal	Ambrose Cheung Wing-sum	uncontested		
Liberal win (new seat)				
