= Tsz Ching Estate =

Public housing estate in Tsz Wan Shan, Hong Kong

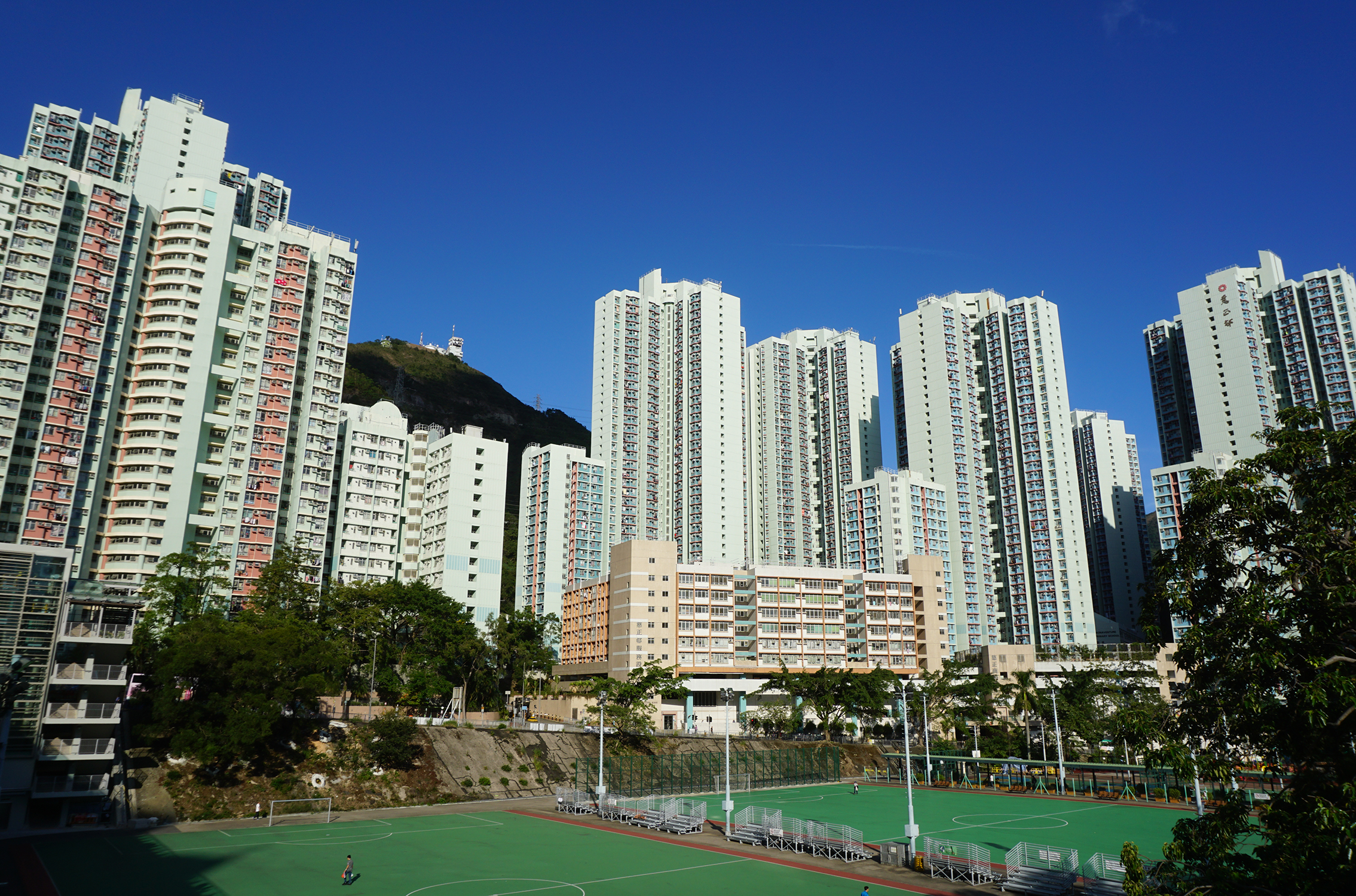
- Tsz Ching Estate
- Interactive map of Tsz Ching Estate

General information
- Location: 80 Tsz Wan Shan Road, Tsz Wan Shan; Kowloon, Hong Kong
- Coordinates: 22.35002°N 114.20287°E
- Status: Completed
- Category: Public rental housing
- Population: 25,844 (2016)
- No. of blocks: 11
- No. of units: 8,177

Construction
- Constructed: 1980; 46 years ago (before reconstruction); 1993; 33 years ago (after reconstruction)
- Authority: Hong Kong Housing Authority

Tsz Ching Estate (Chinese: 慈正邨) is a public housing estate located in Tsz Wan Shan, Kowloon, Hong Kong next to Tsz Oi Court. It consists of eleven residential blocks completed between 1993 and 2001. The site was formerly Blocks 48 to 53 in Tsz Wan Shan Estate, which was also called "Tsz Ching Estate". After redevelopment, the eastern part of Old Tsz Oi Estate was assigned to Tsz Ching Estate.

Tsz Oi Court (Chinese: 慈愛苑) is a Home Ownership Scheme court in Tsz Wan Shan, next to Tsz Ching Estate. The site was formerly Tsz Oi Estate (Chinese: 慈愛邨), which included Blocks 33 to 47 in Tsz Wan Shan Estate. In 1985, Block 40 was found to have structural problems by the Hong Kong Housing Authority. After redevelopment, the estate was converted to HOS housing and was developed into 3 phases. Phase 1 and 2 has six residential blocks built in 1997 while Phase 3 has six residential blocks built in 2000.

== Houses ==
=== Tsz Ching Estate ===
Name	Chinese name	Building type	Completed
Ching Tak House	正德樓	Harmony 3	1993
Ching Fai House	正暉樓	Harmony 3A	1996
Ching Hong House	正康樓	Harmony 1	1996
Ching On House	正安樓	Harmony 1	1996
Ching Wo House	正和樓	Harmony 1	1999
Ching Yi House	正怡樓	Harmony 1	1999
Ching Tai House	正泰樓	Harmony 1	1999
Ching Yuk House	正旭樓	Harmony 1	2001
Ching Ming House	正明樓	Harmony 1	2001
Ching Yuen House	正遠樓	Harmony 1	2001
Ancillary Facilities Block	服務設施大樓	Ancillary Facilities Block	2001

=== Tsz Oi Court ===
Name	Chinese name	Building type	Completed
Oi Wai House	愛慧閣	New Cruciform (Ver.1984)	1997
Oi Yin House	愛賢閣	New Cruciform (Ver.1984)	1997
Oi Kan House	愛勤閣	New Cruciform (Ver.1984)	1997
Oi Ning House	愛寧閣	New Cruciform (Ver.1984)	1997
Oi Yan House	愛仁閣	New Cruciform (Ver.1984)	1997
Oi Chung House	愛聰閣	New Cruciform (Ver.1984)	1997
Oi Fu House	愛富閣	Concord 1	2000
Oi Yue House	愛裕閣	Concord 1	2000
Oi Wing House	愛榮閣	Concord 1	2000
Oi Wah House	愛華閣	Concord 1	2000
Oi Hong House	愛康閣	Concord 1	2000
Oi Cheung House	愛祥閣	Concord 1	2000

== Demographics ==
According to the 2016 by-census, Tsz Ching Estate had a population of 25,844 while Tsz Oi Court had a population of 12,635. Altogether the population amounts to 38,479.

== Politics ==
For the 2019 District Council election, the estate fell within two constituencies. Most of the estate falls within the Ching On constituency, which was formerly represented by Wong Yat-yuk until July 2021, while Ching Tak House, Ching Wo House and Tsz Oi Court fall within the Ching Oi constituency, which was formerly represented by Eddie Sham Yu-hin until July 2021.

== See also ==
- Public housing estates in Tsz Wan Shan
