= Urban Council (constituency) =

Former Hong Kong functional constituency

- Former Functional constituency for the Legislative Council of Hong Kong

Former constituency
- Created: 1985
- Abolished: 2000
- Number of members: One
- Replaced by: Catering; District Council

The Urban Council was an election college created in 1985 Legislative Council election and became one of the functional constituencies between 1991 and 1998 for the Legislative Council of Hong Kong, until the Urban Council and Regional Council were abolished in 1999 and replaced by District Council and Catering. The constituency was composed of all members of the Urban Council.

== Legislative Council members ==
Election	Member	Party
1985	Hilton Cheong-Leen	Civic Association
1988	Elsie Tu	Independent
1991	Elsie Tu	Independent
1995	Mok Ying-fan	ADPL
Not represented in the Provisional Legislative Council (1996–98)
1998	Ambrose Cheung	Independent
2000	Constituency abolished	

== Election results ==
=== 1990s ===
1998 Legislative Council election: Urban Council
Party	Candidate	Votes	%	±%
Independent	Ambrose Cheung Wing-sum	26	56.52	
Independent	Ronnie Wong Man-chiu	20	43.48	
ADPL	Mok Ying-fan	0	0.00	
Majority		6	13.04	
Total valid votes		46	100.00	
Rejected ballots		1		
Turnout		47	94.00	
Registered electors		50		
Independent win (new seat)				

1995 Legislative Council election: Urban Council
Party	Candidate	Votes	%	±%
ADPL	Mok Ying-fan	Unopposed		
Registered electors		41		
ADPL gain from Independent		Swing		

1991 Legislative Council election: Urban Council
Party	Candidate	Votes	%	±%
Independent	Elsie Tu	Unopposed		
Independent hold		Swing		
Registered electors		40		

=== 1980s ===
1988 Legislative Council election: Urban Council
Party	Candidate	Votes	%	±%
Independent	Elsie Tu	Unopposed		
Independent gain from Civic		Swing		

1985 Legislative Council election: Urban Council
Party	Candidate	Votes	%	±%
Civic	Hilton Cheong-Leen	16	55.2	
Independent	Elsie Tu	13	44.8	
Civic win (new seat)				
