= Carratu International =

British private investigation company

- Founded: 1963
- Headquarters: London, England
- Services: Corporate investigations
- Website: carratu.co.uk

Carratu was set up in 1963 by Vincent Carratu as a corporate investigations company. Carratu has been referred to by the Sunday Times as the "world's most accomplished private investigator". As such it is the oldest privately owned corporate investigations company in the United Kingdom. The company is based in London. The company previously traded as Carratu International Plc until September 2010, when it changed its name to Carratu Ltd.

== Corporate espionage investigations ==
The firm was secretly engaged by agents of British Airways during their dirty tricks campaign against Virgin Atlantic to attempt to track down the source of leaks. When a private investigator was arrested for stealing bin bags from journalist Roger Eglin, Vince Carratu admitted "Everybody does that".

== Hughes v Carratu International ==
In 2006, the Information Commissioner found that a private investigator under Carratu's instructions, in turn instructed by law firm Mishcon de Reya, had illegally obtained the bank account information of David Hughes. Hughes brought a legal action for breach of confidence and breach of the Data Protection Act 1998, and in Hughes v Carratu International plc [2006] EWHC 1791 (QB) the court ordered full disclosure of information about the case to Hughes; this case has become important in its requirement to disclose information regardless of legal professional privilege, as well as serving as a cautionary tale for law firms hiring private investigators.
