= Mei Tung Estate =

Public housing estate in Wong Tai Sin, Hong Kong

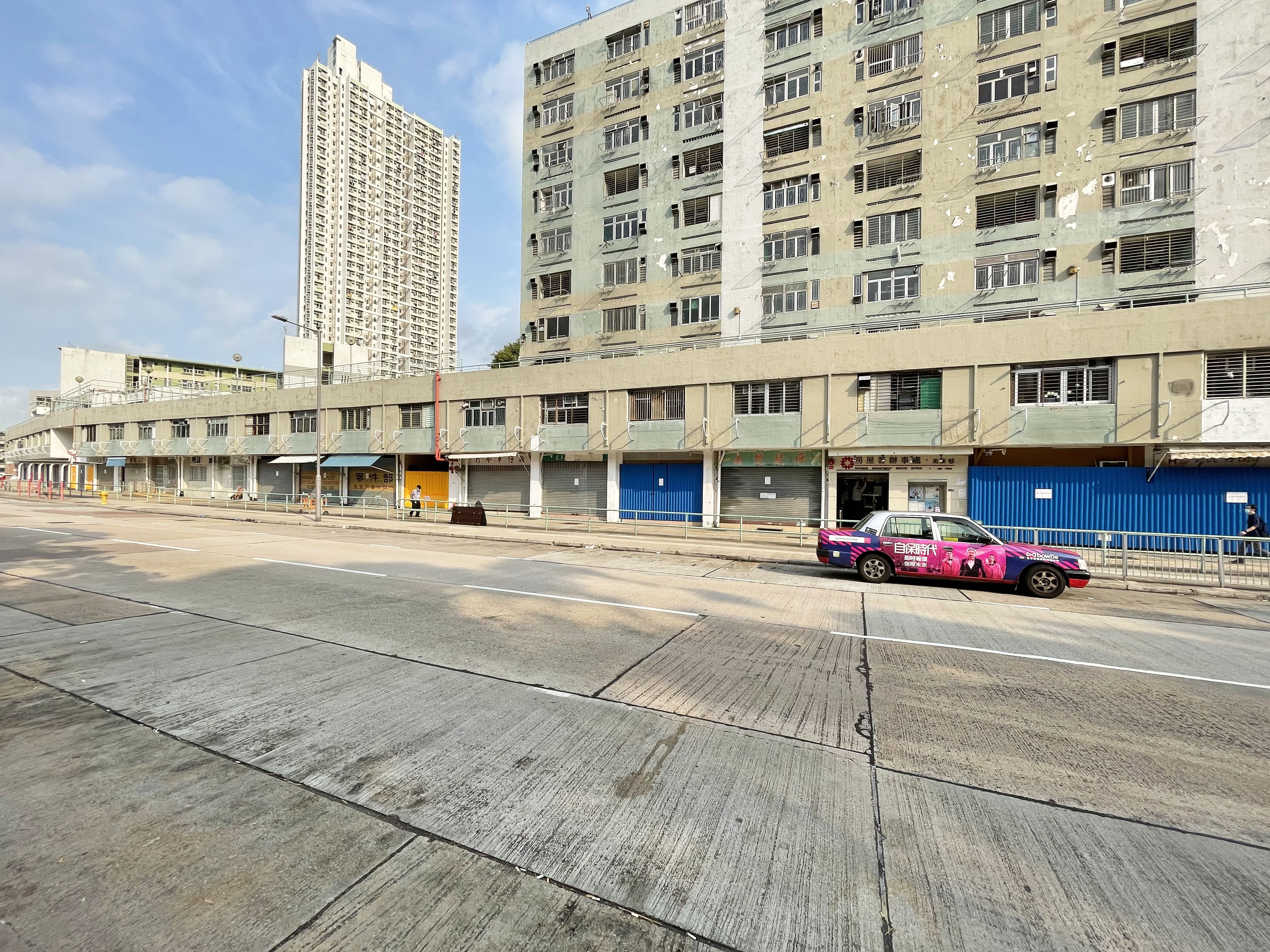
- Mei Tung Estate along Tung Tau Tsuen Road in 2021.
- Interactive map of Mei Tung Estate

General information
- Location: 180 Tung Tau Tsuen Road (Mei Tung House and Mei Po House); 130 Junction Road (Mei Yan House); 23 Pui Man Street (Mei Tak House)
- Coordinates: 22.33262°N 114.18908°E
- Status: Completed
- Category: Public rental housing
- Population: 6,067 (2016)
- No. of blocks: 4
- No. of units: 2,500

Construction
- Constructed: 1974 (Mei Tung House and Mei Po House); 2011 (Mei Yan House); 2014 (Mei Tak House)
- Authority: Hong Kong Housing Authority

Listing
- Demolished: 2022 (Mei Tung House and Mei Po House portions, Under redevelopment)

Mei Tung Estate
- Traditional Chinese: 美東邨
- Simplified Chinese: 美东邨
Transcriptions
Standard Mandarin
- Hanyu Pinyin: Měi Dōng Cūn
Yue: Cantonese
- Jyutping: mei5 dung1 cyun1

Mei Tung Estate (Chinese: 美東邨) is a public housing estate located at the south of Wong Tai Sin, Kowloon, Hong Kong opposite Kowloon Walled City Park. It consists of 2 Old Slab-typed blocks, each building is 8-storey, providing over 600 flats. Although the estate is near Kowloon City, it belongs to Wong Tai Sin District rather than Kowloon City District because it is located at the north of Tung Tau Tsuen Road (Chinese: 東頭村道), the boundary between two districts. A third block opened in 2010, and a fourth opened in 2014.

== Background ==
In 1971, the British Hong Kong Government cleared Tung Wo Village and Chiu Ping New Village in Tung Tau Squatter Area. In 1974, one block of the estate, "Block 6", was constructed. The government planned to demolish nearby Sai Tau Village in Kowloon City to construct remaining blocks, but the plan was strongly opposed by the village residents. As a result, the plan was left aside. (Sai Tau Village was finally demolished in 1984 to build the current Carpenter Road Park.) Since no other blocks were built, "Block 6" was renamed as "Mei Tung House" in 1979. In 1981, the government decided to construct one more block on the left side of Mei Tung House. In 1983, the block, "Mei Po House", was completed. As of 2022 via Google Street View, Mei Tung House and Mei Po House portions of the Mei Tung Estate were demolished and now under redevelopment by Hong Kong Housing Authority for new public housing project.

== Houses ==
Name	Chinese name	Building type	Completed	Demolished
Mei Tung House	美東樓	Old Slab	1974	2022
Mei Po House	美寶樓	Old Slab	1983	2022
Mei Yan House	美仁樓	Non-standard	2010	-
Mei Tak House	美德樓	Non-standard	2014	-

== Demographics ==
According to the 2016 by-census, Mei Tung Estate had a population of 6,067. The median age was 41.4 and the majority of residents (98 per cent) were of Chinese ethnicity. The average household size was 2.5 people. The median monthly household income of all households (i.e. including both economically active and inactive households) was HK$17,000.

== Politics ==
Mei Tung Estate is located in Tung Mei constituency of the Wong Tai Sin District Council. It was formerly represented by Sze Tak-loy, who was elected in the 2019 elections until July 2021.

== Education ==
Mei Tung Estate is in Primary One Admission (POA) School Net 41. Within the school net are multiple aided schools (operated independently but funded with government money) and Kowloon Tong Government Primary School.

== See also ==
- Public housing estates in Wong Tai Sin
