= Tung Tau (constituency) =

- 東頭
- Elected constituency for the Wong Tai Sin District Council
- Boundary of Tung Tau in Wong Tai Sin District
- District: Wong Tai Sin
- Legislative Council constituency: Kowloon Central
- Population: 16,884 (2019)
- Electorate: 10,822 (2019)

Current constituency
- Created: 1991
- Number of members: One
- Member: (Vacant)

Tung Tau
- Traditional Chinese: 東頭
Transcriptions
Yue: Cantonese
- Yale Romanization: Dūng tàuh
- Jyutping: Dung1 tau4

Tung Tau is one of the 25 constituencies in the Wong Tai Sin District in Hong Kong. The constituency returns one district councillor to the Wong Tai Sin District Council, with an election every four years.

The constituency has an estimated population of 16,884.

== Councillors represented ==
Election	Member	Party
1991	Fung Kwong-chung	Civic Association
199?	Fung Kwong-chung	Liberal
199?	Fung Kwong-chung	Independent
2007	Li Tak-hong	DAB
2019	Hiroko Wan Chi-chung→Vacant	People Power

== Election results ==
=== 2010s ===
Wong Tai Sin District Council Election, 2019: Tung Tau
Party	Candidate	Votes	%	±%
People Power	Hiroko Wan Chi-chung	3,822	51.09	
DAB	Li Tak-hong	3,659	48.91	
Majority		163	2.18	
Turnout		7,517	69.47	
People Power gain from DAB		Swing		
