= Sze Tak-loy =

Politician

- 施德來
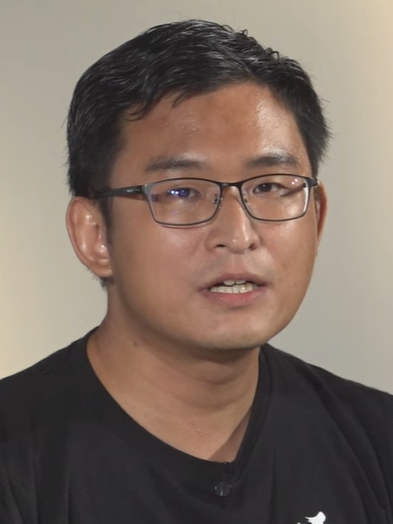

Chairman of the Hong Kong Association for Democracy and People's Livelihood
- Incumbent
- Assumed office 24 September 2016
- Preceded by: Rosanda Mok

Member of the Wong Tai Sin District Council
- In office 1 January 2016 – 8 July 2021
- Preceded by: Mok Ying-fan
- Succeeded by: (Vacant)
- Constituency: Tung Mei

Personal details
- Born: 1982 (age 43–44) Hong Kong
- Party: Hong Kong Association for Democracy and People's Livelihood
- Occupation: Politician

Sze Tak-loy (Chinese: 施德來; born 1982) is a Hong Kong politician. He is currently chairman of the Hong Kong Association for Democracy and People's Livelihood (ADPL) and was a member of the Wong Tai Sin District Council for Tung Mei.

In the 2015 District Council elections, Sze was first elected to the Wong Tai Sin District Council, succeeding veteran Mok Ying-fan in Tung Mei.

In 2016, Sze became vice-chairman alongside Tam Kwok-kiu while Rosanda Mok became the first party chairwoman. In the 2016 Legislative Council election when Mok resigned as ADPL chairwoman after the party lost all its seats in the Legislative Council, Sze acted as chairman. In December 2016, he was elected new party chairman.

On 6 January 2021, Sze was among 53 members of the pro-democratic camp who were arrested under the national security law, specifically its provision regarding alleged subversion. The group stood accused of the organisation of and participation in unofficial primary elections held by the camp in July 2020. Sze was released on bail on 7 January. On 30 May 2024, Sze was found guilty of subversion in the primaries case, along with 13 other defendants.

Political offices
Preceded by Mok Ying-fan	Member of the Wong Tai Sin District Council; Representative for Tung Mei; 2016–2021	Succeeded by (Vacant)
Party political offices
Preceded by Rosanda Mok	Chairman of the Association for Democracy and People's Livelihood; 2016–present	Incumbent
