= Public housing estates in Tsz Wan Shan =

Public housing in Tsz Wan Shan, Hong Kong

The following shows the Resettlement Housing estates in Tsz Wan Shan, Wong Tai Sin District, Kowloon, Hong Kong.

== History ==
Known as Tsz Wan Shan, or Temple Hill, the block design of the Tsz Wan Shan Resettlement Housing was different from that of Shek Kip Mei Resettlement Estate, with room access from the internal corridor. Each room had its own private balcony, water tap and toilet.

In 1980, the estate was split into Tsz Lok Estate, Tsz Oi Estate, Tsz Ching Estate, Tsz Man Estate and Tsz On Estate. In 1985, Blocks 40, 61 to 65 were found to have structural problems by the Hong Kong Housing Authority. All the blocks were demolished between the 1980s and 1990s, and replaced by new blocks of Tsz On Court, Tsz Lok Estate, Tsz Oi Court, Tsz Ching Estate, Tsz Man Estate and Tsz Hong Estate.

== Overview ==
Name		Type	Inaug.	No Blocks	No Units	Notes
Shatin Pass Estate	沙田坳邨	Public	2011	2	1,278	
Tsz Ching Estate	慈正邨	Public	1993	11	8,177	
Tsz Hong Estate	慈康邨	Public	2002	5	2,000	
Tsz Lok Estate	慈樂邨	Public	1995	11	6,140	
Tsz Man Estate	慈民邨	Public	1994	3	2,043	
Tsz Oi Court	慈愛苑	HOS	1997, 2000	12	4,020	
Tsz On Court	慈安苑	HOS	1994,1997	2	972	

== Shatin Pass Estate ==
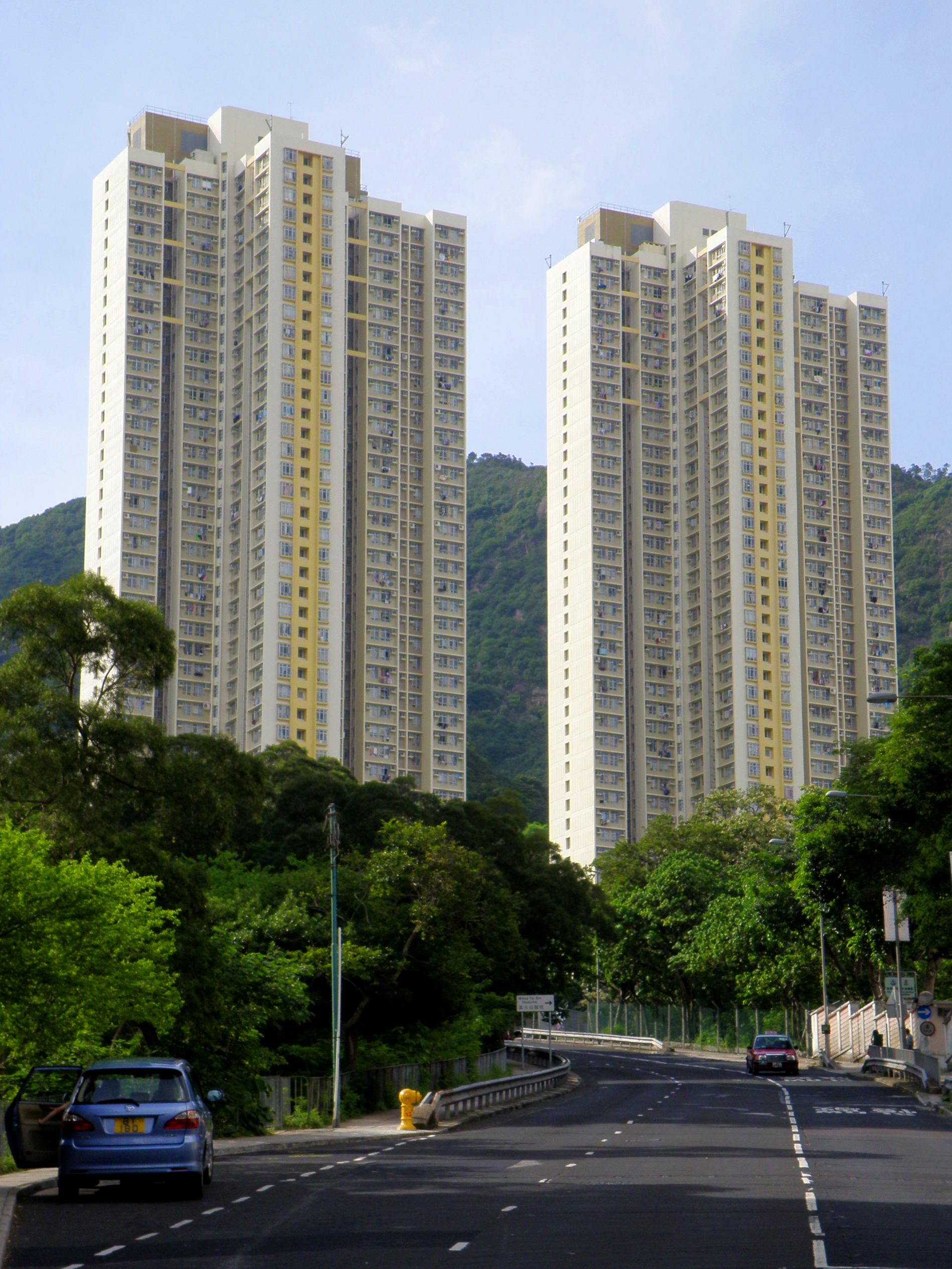
Shatin Pass Estate

Shatin Pass Estate (Chinese: 沙田坳邨) was a public housing estate in Sha Tin Pass, Tsz Wan Shan. It was formerly called Shatin Pass Government Low-Cost Housing Estate (Chinese: 沙田坳政府廉租屋邨). It had 2 blocks built in 1967 and 1968 respectively. In 1973, it was renamed as Shatin Pass Estate. In 2001, the two blocks were demolished. They were replaced by two 42-story blocks in 2011, offering 1,278 units.

=== Houses ===
Name	Type	Completion
Wo Tin House	Non-standard	2011
Shun Tin House	Non-standard	2011

== Tsz Ching Estate ==
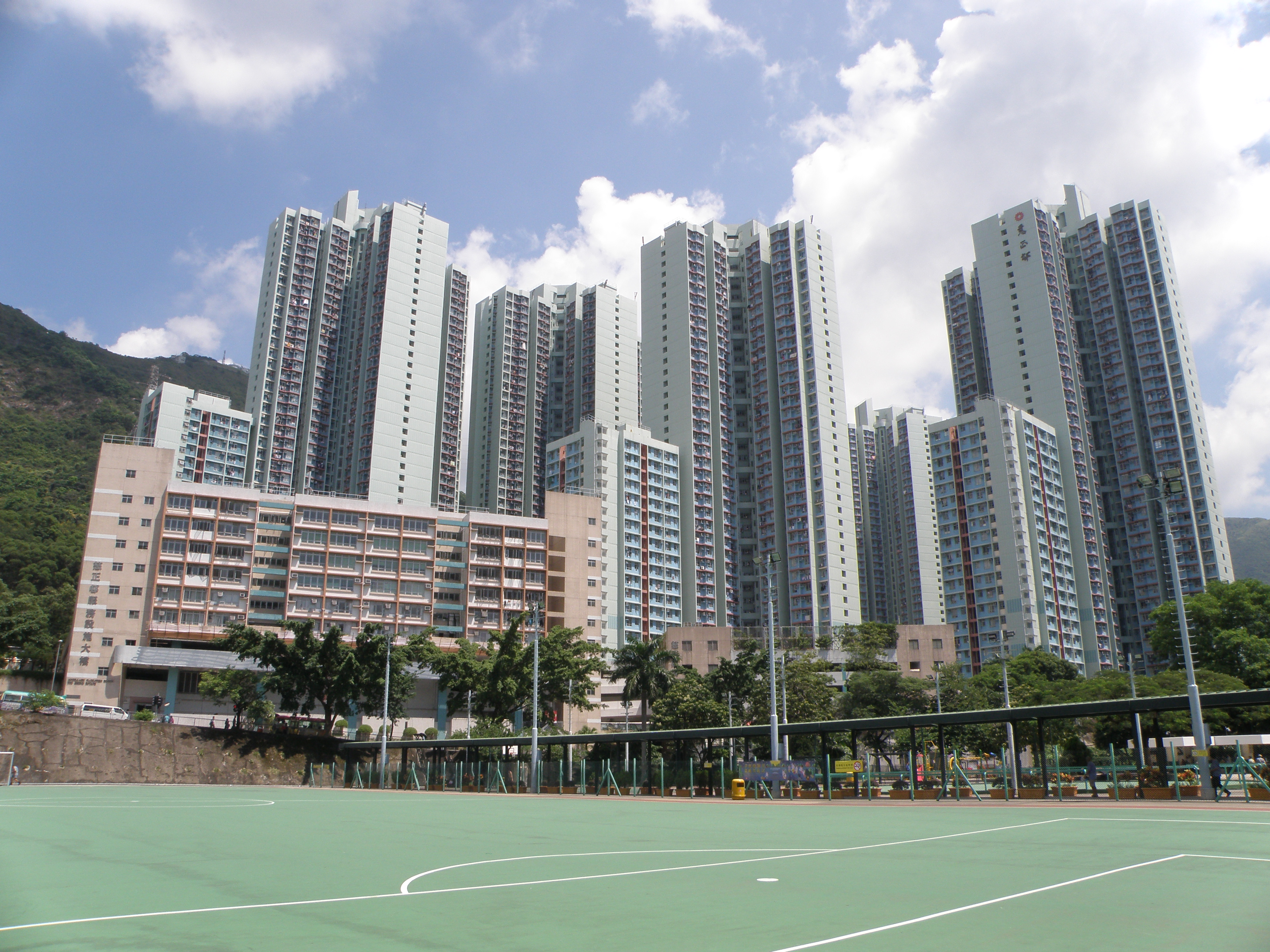
Tsz Ching Estate

Tsz Ching Estate (Chinese: 慈正邨) is a public housing estate in Tsz Wan Shan, next to Tsz Oi Court. It has 11 blocks built between the 1990s and 2000s (decade). The site was formerly Blocks 48 to 53 in Tsz Wan Shan Estate, which was also called "Tsz Ching Estate". After redevelopment, the eastern part of Old Tsz Oi Estate was assigned to Tsz Ching Estate.

== Tsz Hong Estate ==
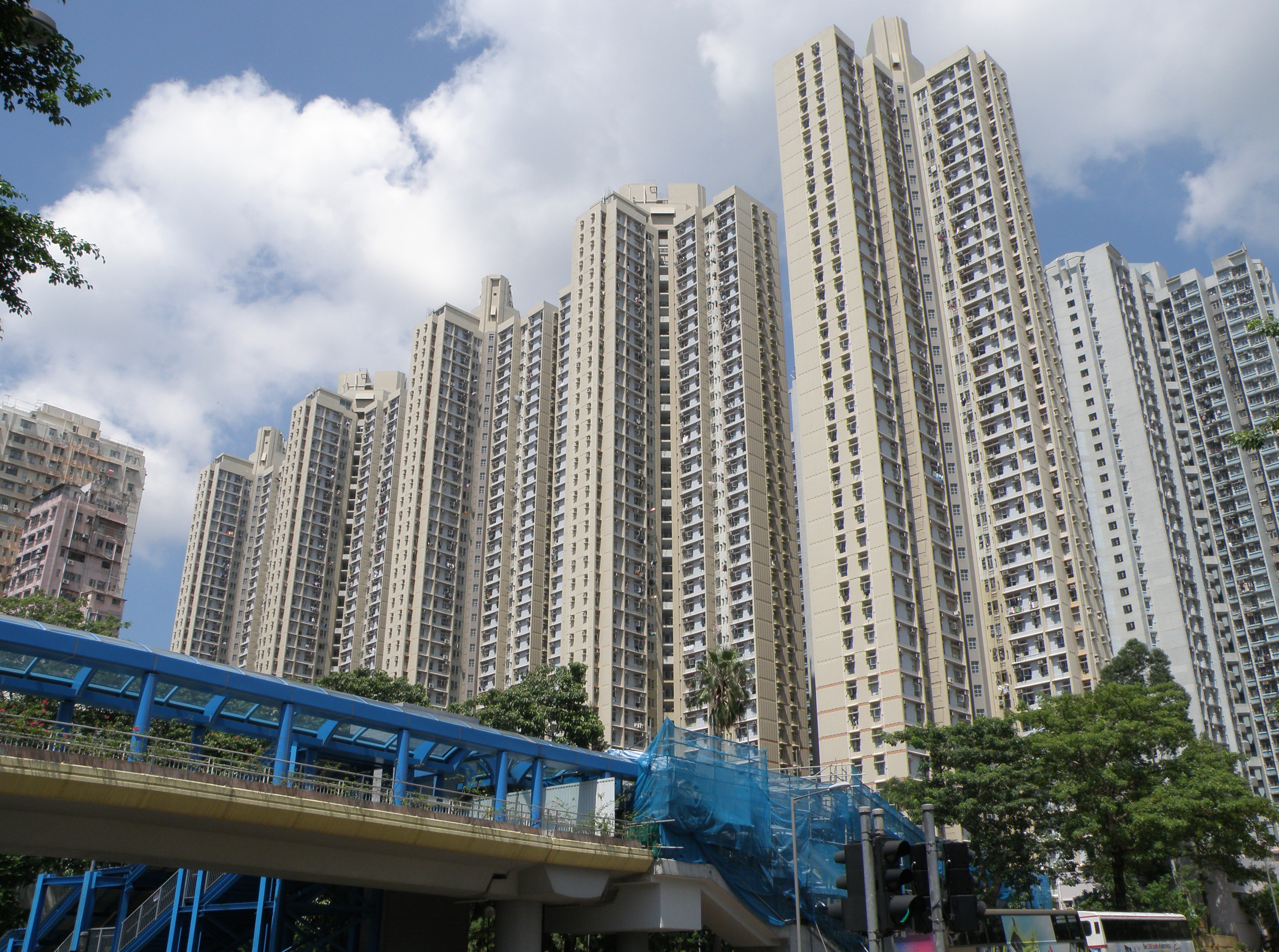
Tsz Hong Estate

Tsz Hong Estate (Chinese: 慈康邨) is a public housing estate in Tsz Wan Shan. It has blocks built in 2002.

The estate was formerly the site of Block 66 of Tsz Wan Shan Estate. The block was the largest in the estate. In 1980, the block was reassigned to Tsz Man Estate. In 1997, the block was demolished. In 2002, 5 new HOS blocks of Tsz On Court were completed in the site. However, they were finally transferred to public housing and renamed as Tsz Hong Estate.

=== Houses ===
Name	Type	Completion
Hong Kin House	New Cruciform (Ver.1999)	2002
Hong Sau House	New Cruciform (Ver.1999)	2002
Hong Tak House	New Cruciform (Ver.1999)	2002
Hong Tim House	New Cruciform (Ver.1999)	2002
Hong Yun House	New Cruciform (Ver.1999)	2002

== Tsz Lok Estate ==
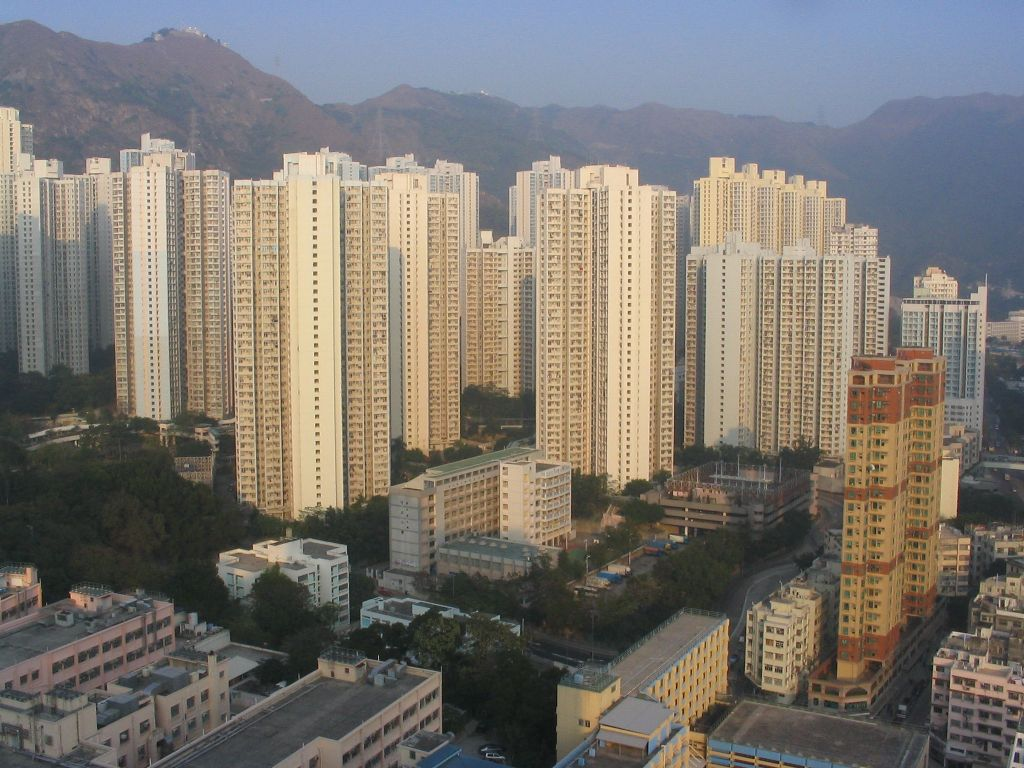
Tsz Lok Estate

Tsz Lok Estate (Chinese: 慈樂邨) is a public housing estate in Tsz Wan Shan. The site was formerly Tsz Lok Estate, which included Blocks 4 to 32 in Tsz Wan Shan Estate. After redevelopment, 11 rental blocks were built in the south part of the site. However, the north part was assigned to build Phase 1 and 2 of Tsz Oi Court.

=== Houses ===
Name	Type	Completion
Lok Cheung House	Harmony 1	1996
Lok Tin House	Harmony 1	1996
Lok Shing House	Harmony 1	1998
Lok Shun House	Harmony 1	1998
Lok Wong House	Harmony 1	1998
Lok Yan House	Harmony 1	1998
Lok Hop House	Harmony 3	1997
Lok Moon House	Harmony 3	1997
Lok On House	Harmony 3	1997
Lok Foon House	Small Household Block	2004
Ancillary Facilities Block		1997

== Tsz Man Estate ==
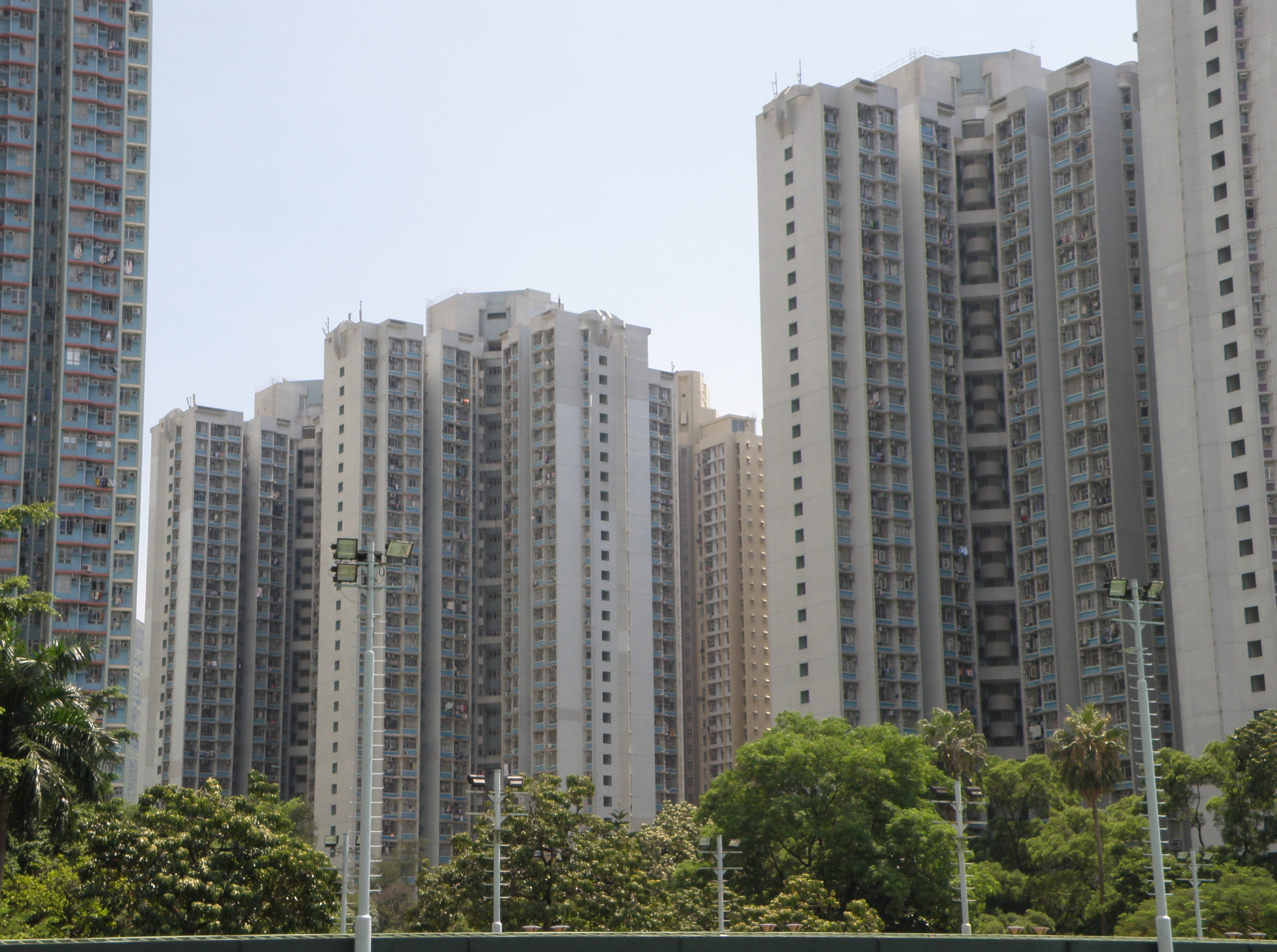
Tsz Man Estate

Tsz Man Estate (Chinese: 慈民邨) is a public housing estate in Tsz Wan Shan. The site was formerly Tsz Man Estate, which included Blocks 61 to 66 in Tsz Wan Shan Estate. In 1985, Blocks 61 to 65 were found to have structural problems by the Hong Kong Housing Authority. After redevelopment, three rental blocks of new Tsz Man Estate and HOS blocks of Tsz On Court were constructed in the site. However, 5 HOS blocks built on the site of former Block 66 were transferred to rental housing and renamed "Tsz Hong Estate".

=== Houses ===
Name	Type	Completion
Man Kin House	Harmony 1	1994
Man Tai House	Harmony 1	1994
Man Yue House	Harmony 1	1994

== Tsz Oi Court ==
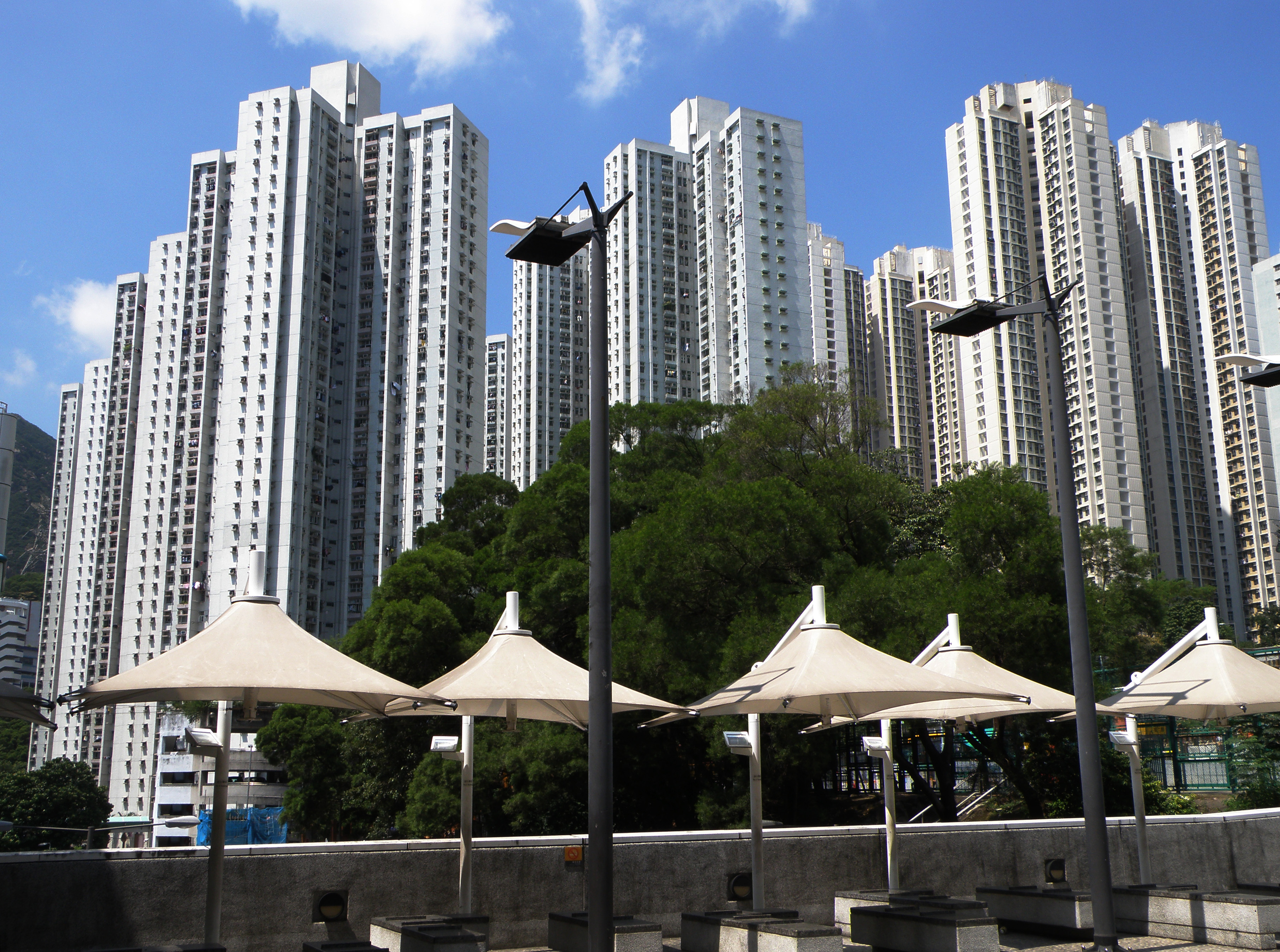
Tsz Oi Court

Tsz Oi Court (Chinese: 慈愛苑) is a Home Ownership Scheme estate in Tsz Wan Shan, next to Tsz Ching Estate. The site was formerly Tsz Oi Estate (Chinese: 慈愛邨), which included Blocks 33 to 47 in Tsz Wan Shan Estate. In 1985, Blocks 40 was found to have structural problems by the Hong Kong Housing Authority. After redevelopment, the estate was converted to HOS housing and was developed into 3 phases. Phase 1 and 2 has 6 blocks built in 1997 while Phase 3 has 6 blocks built in 2000.

=== Houses ===
Name	Type	Completion
Oi Wai House	New Cruciform (Ver.1984)	1997
Oi Yin House	New Cruciform (Ver.1984)	1997
Oi Kan House	New Cruciform (Ver.1984)	1997
Oi Ning House	New Cruciform (Ver.1984)	1997
Oi Yan House	New Cruciform (Ver.1984)	1997
Oi Chung House	New Cruciform (Ver.1984)	1997
Oi Fu House	Concord 1	2000
Oi Yue House	Concord 1	2000
Oi Wing House	Concord 1	2000
Oi Wah House	Concord 1	2000
Oi Hong House	Concord 1	2000
Oi Cheung House	Concord 1	2000

== Tsz On Court ==
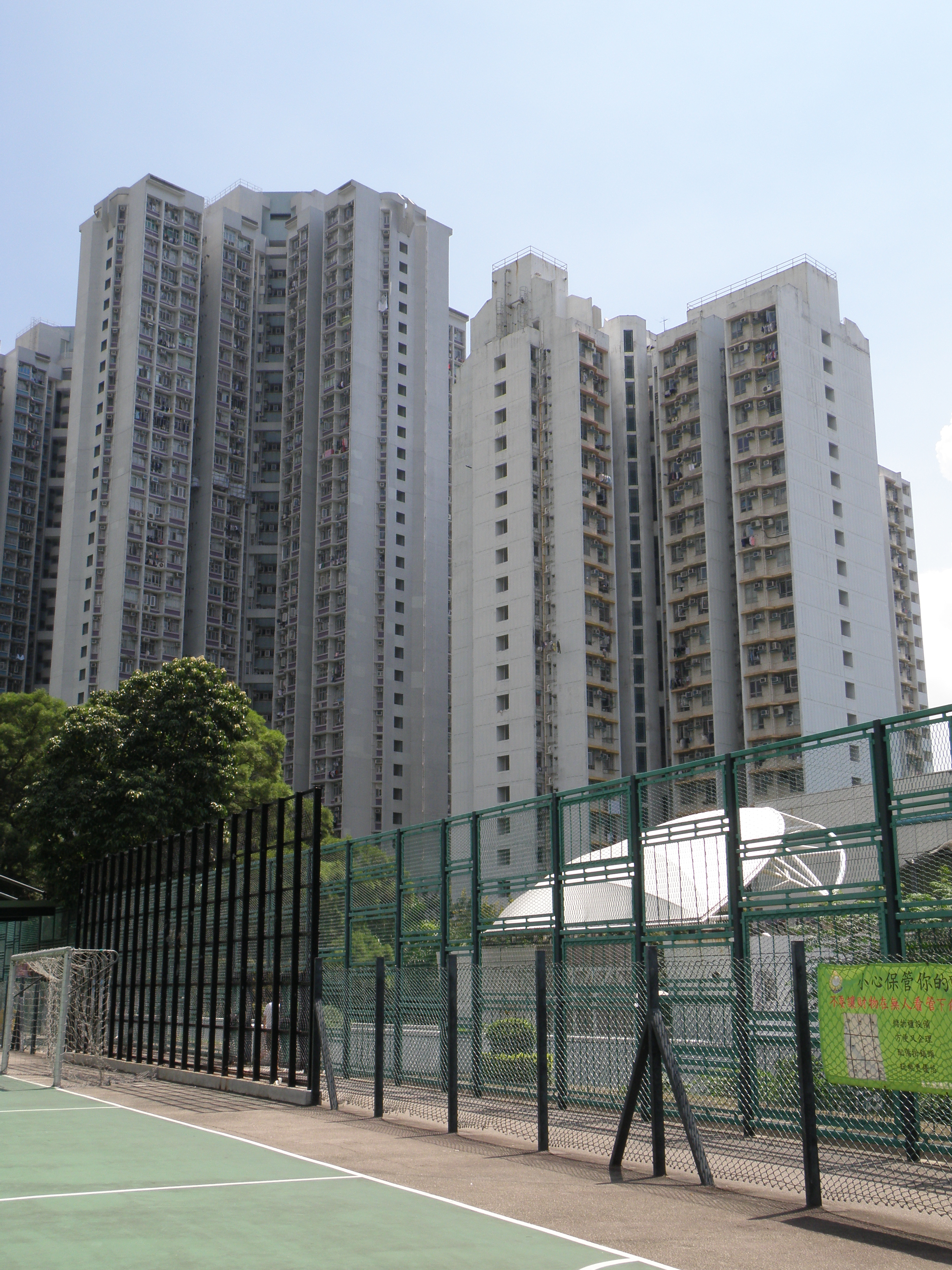
Tsz On Court

Tsz On Court (Chinese: 慈安苑) is a Home Ownership Scheme estate in Tsz Wan Shan, between Tsz Man Estate, Tsz Hong Estate and Tsz Wan Shan Centre. The site was formerly Tsz On Estate (Chinese: 慈安邨) which included Blocks 1 to 3 and Blocks 57 to 60 of Tsz Wan Shan Estate. After redevelopment, the estate was converted to rental housing of new Tsz Lok Estate and HOS housing of Tsz On Court. Tsz On Court consists of 2 blocks which were built in 1994 and 1997 respectively. In 2002, other 5 new HOS blocks of Tsz On Court were transferred to rental housing and renamed as Tsz Hong Estate.

=== Houses ===
Name	Type	Completion
On Yan House	Harmony 1	1994
On Hong House	Harmony 3A	1997

== See also ==
- List of public housing estates in Hong Kong
