= Yeung =

Yeung (simplified Chinese: 杨; traditional Chinese: 楊; Jyutping: Joeng4) is a Cantonese variant form of the surname Yang.

== Entertainment ==
- Edgar Fullerton Yeung, alter ego of fictional DC Comics supervillain Egg Fu
- Icy Yeung Man Bing, character in 2014 Hong Kong modern thriller TVB serial Black Heart White Soul
- Inspector Yeung, character in 1996 Hong Kong exploitation film Ebola Syndrome
- Rachel Yeung Lai-ching, character in Hong Kong girls with guns film series In the Line of Duty
- Samantha and Joe Yeung, characters in 2023 American crime drama TV series City on Fire
- This Is Emily Yeung., 2006 Canadian children's TV series
- Yeung Chuk-luen, character in 2016 Hong Kong martial arts action TV drama A Fist Within Four Walls
- Yeung Chun and Yeung Sing, characters in 1990 Hong Kong comedy film No Risk, No Gain
- Yeung Dit-lap, character in 2024 Hong Kong film The Prosecutor
- Yeung family in 2012 Hong Kong historical-fiction drama serial King Maker
- Yeung family in 2010 Hong Kong period television drama No Regrets
- Yeung Kam-Wing, character in 2003 Hong Kong crime drama film Infernal Affairs III
- Yeung Kwan, character in 1994 Hong Kong film Drunken Master III
- Yeung Kwong Yiu, character in 2024 Hong Kong television series See Her Again
- Yeung Nai-mou, character in 1994 Hong Kong erotic black comedy film A Chinese Torture Chamber Story
- Yeung To, character in 2025 Hong Kong film by Alan Mak Under Current

== People with the surname ==
- Albert Yeung (born 1943), Hong Kong businessman
- Alexandra Yeung (born 1972), Hong Kong cyclist
- Alvin Yeung (born 1981), Hong Kong barrister and politician
- Angelababy (born 1989), Chinese actress and singer
- Benjamin Yeung (Canadian businessman), Hong Kong-born Canadian real estate developer
- Bernard Yeung (born 1953), Hong Kong-born American economist
- Bernice Yeung, American writer and investigative journalist
- Bik Kwoon Tye (Chinese: 戴楊碧瓘) (born c. 1947), Chinese-American geneticist and biologist
- Bolo Yeung (born 1946), Hong Kong actor and martial artist
- Carson Yeung (born 1960), Hong Kong businessman
- Cassie Yeung (born 1994), American chef and TikToker
- Cecilia Yeung (1930–2021), Hong Kong politician
- Cecilia Yeung Man-wai (born 1994), Hong Kong high jumper
- Charles Yeung (born 1947), Hong Kong politician
- Charles Yeung Siu-cho (born 1934), Hong Kong rural politician
- Charlie Yeung (born 1974), Taiwan-born Hong Kong actress
- Christian Yeung (born 1987), American actor and basketball player
- Clarisse Yeung (born 1986), Hong Kong politician
- David Yeung (born 1976), Hong Kong entrepreneur
- Denise Yeung, Hong Kong racing driver
- Edward Yeung, Chinese-American chemist
- God-Ho Yeung, pseudonym of Hong Kong filmmaker Godfrey Ho
- Ingrid Yeung (born 1965), Hong Kong civil servant
- Isobel Yeung (born 1986), British documentary correspondent
- Jamie Yeung (born 1997), Hong Kong swimmer
- Johnson Yeung (born 1991), Hong Kong social activist
- Kate Yeung (born 1984), Hong Kong actress and singer
- Keith Yeung (born 1964), Hong Kong judge and law officer
- Keith M L Yeung (born 1988), Hong Kong horse racing jockey
- Kevin Yeung (born 1963), Hong Kong government official
- Lenna Yeung (born 1977), Hong Kong actress
- Lokman Yeung, leader of Hong Kong boy band Mirror
- Mat Yeung (born 1981), Hong Kong TV actor and host
- Melody Yeung (born 1960/1961), Hong Kong ten-pin bowler
- Michael Yeung (1945–2019), Bishop of Hong Kong from 2017 to 2019
- Miki Yeung (born 1985), Hong Kong singer and actress
- Minerva Yeung, American research scientist and educator
- Miriam Yeung (born 1974), Hong Kong singer and actress
- Miriam Yeung (activist), Hong Kong-American activist
- Momo Yeung, Hong Kong actress and ballerina
- Norman Yeung, Canadian actor, writer, filmmaker and artist
- Pauline Yeung (born 1967), Hong Kong actress
- Pui-Kuen Yeung, Hong Kong-American engineer and academic
- Ray Yeung, Hong Kong screenwriter and film director
- Raymond Yeung, founder of Hong Kong independent bookstore and publisher Hillway Culture
- Raymond W. Yeung (born 1962), Hong Kong information theorist
- Renci Yeung (born 1993), Hong Kong film and TV actress
- Rob Yeung, British psychologist and management author
- Ronald Yeung (cyclist) (born 1988), Hong Kong professional cyclist
- Ronald Yeung, founder of Hong Kong phone accessories company Casetify
- Ronald W. Yeung (born 1945), Hong Kong professor
- Sandra Yeung Racco, Vaughan city councillor for Ward 4 (Concord/Thornhill) from 2003 to 2022
- Sharon Yeung Pan Pan (born 1958), Taiwanese actress and producer
- Shirley Yeung (born 1978), Hong Kong actress
- Suzie Yeung (born 1991), American voice actress
- Tavia Yeung (born 1979), Hong Kong actress
- Tim Yeung (born 1978), American extreme metal drummer
- Victor Yeung, Hong Kong district councillor
- Vincy Yeung, Edison Chen photo scandal victim
- Wally Yeung (born 1950), Hong Kong judge
- Wei-Jun Jean Yeung, Taiwanese sociologist and demographer
- William Kwong Yu Yeung (born 1960), Hong Kong-born Canadian astronomer
  - 172P/Yeung, a periodic Jupiter-family comet discovered by him
- Win Win Yeung (born 1996), Hong Kong singer and presenter
- Winnie Yeung, Canadian schoolteacher and writer
- Y. K. J. Yeung Sik Yuen (born 1947), Chief Justice of Mauritius from 2007 to 2013
- Yeung Chi Ka (fencer) (born 1994), Hong Kong foil fencer
- Yeung Chi Ka (table tennis) (born 1988), Hong Kong para table tennis player
- Yeung Chi Lun (born 1989), Hong Kong footballer
- Yeung Ching Kwong (born 1976), Hong Kong footballer and coach
- Yeung Chui Ling (born 1982), Hong Kong fencer
- Yeung Hok-ling (1868–1934), Chinese revolutionary
- Yeung Kai-yin (1941–2007), Hong Kong civil servant and businessman
- Yeung Ku-wan (1861–1901), Chinese revolutionary
- Yeung Kwo (1919–1956), Malaysian politician
- Yeung Kwong (1926–2015), Hong Kong trade unionist
- Yeung Leung-jit, a general to which Hau Wong usually refers
- Yeung Luen Lin (born 1956), Hong Kong judoka
- Yeung Nga Ting (born 1998), Hong Kong badminton player
- Yeung Pak-long (born 1995), Hong Kong tennis player
- Yeung Po-kwan (born 1939), Hong Kong educator and politician
- Yeung Pui Lam (born 2001), Hong Kong badminton player
- Yeung Sau-king (1919–1982), Hong Kong swimmer
- Yeung Sum (born 1947), Hong Kong politician
- Yeung Wai-lun (born 1982), Hong Kong actor
- Yeung Yiu-chung (born 1951), Hong Kong educator and politician

== Hong Kong places named after the surname ==
- G.T. (Ellen Yeung) College, full-time direct subsidy school
- Luk Yeung (constituency), constituency in Tsuen Wan District
- Luk Yeung Galleria, shopping centre in Tsuen Wan
- Luk Yeung Sun Chuen, housing estate in Tsuen Wan
- Nam Chung Yeung Uk, village in Nam Chung, New Territories
- Yeung Ka Tsuen, village in Tai Tong, Yuen Long
- Yeung Kin Man Academic Building, City University of Hong Kong campus building
- Yeung Siu Hang, village in Tuen Mun District
- Yeung Uk Road (constituency), constituency in Tsuen Wan District
- Yeung Uk Tsuen, Shap Pat Heung, village in Yuen Long District
- Yeung Uk Tsuen, Tsuen Wan District, village in Tai Wo Hau
- Yeung Uk Tsuen, Wang Chau, village in Yuen Long District

== See also ==
- Yip Yeung (Chinese: 葉楊), character in 2007 Hong Kong costume drama TV series A Change of Destiny
