= Benjamin Yeung =

Benjamin Yeung may refer to:

- Yang Rong (businessman) (born 1957), exiled Chinese tycoon in the US, founder of auto companies
- Benjamin Yeung (Canadian businessman), Hong-born Canadian businessman

== See also ==
- Benjamin Young (disambiguation)
