= Benjamin Young =

Benjamin or Ben Young may refer to:

- Benjamin F. Young (1841–1927), Canadian-born soldier who fought in the Union Army in the American Civil War
- Benjamin Stanley Young (1851–1934), magistrate of the British Overseas Territory of the Pitcairn Islands
- Benjamin Loring Young (1885–1964), American lawyer and politician
- Ben Young (American football) (born 1960), American football player
- Ben Young (motorcyclist) (born 1993), Scottish Grand Prix motorcycle racer based in Canada

== See also ==
- Benjamin Yeung (disambiguation)
