= Yeung Uk Tsuen =

Yeung Uk Tsuen (Chinese: 楊屋村) is the name of several villages in Hong Kong:

- Yeung Uk Tsuen, Tsuen Wan District, in Tai Wo Hau, Tsuen Wan District
- Yeung Uk Tsuen, Shap Pat Heung, in Shap Pat Heung, Yuen Long District
- Yeung Uk Tsuen, Wang Chau, in Wang Chau, Yuen Long District
