= We Belong Together (disambiguation) =

"We Belong Together" is a 2005 song by Mariah Carey.

We Belong Together may also refer to:

== Music ==
- "We Belong Together" (Robert & Johnny song) (1958)
- "We Belong Together", a 1973 song by the Spinners from Spinners
- "We Belong Together", a 1981 song by Rickie Lee Jones from Pirates
- "We Belong Together", a 1998 song by Tony Thompson and Antoinette from the Down in the Delta film soundtrack
- "We Belong Together", a 2004 song by Kate Ryan from Stronger
- "We Belong Together" (Big Bang song) (2006)
- "We Belong Together", a 2006 song by Gavin DeGraw from Gavin DeGraw from the movie Tristan & Isolde
- "We Belong Together" (Randy Newman song) (2010)
- "We Belong Together", a 2019 song by Vampire Weekend from Father of the Bride

== Other ==
- We Belong Together (campaign), a campaign for immigration reform in the US
- 2014 season 5 episode of Teen Mom 2

== See also ==
- We Belong (disambiguation)
