= Miriam W. Yeung =

Hong Kong-American activist

Miriam W. Yeung is the former executive director of the National Asian Pacific American Women's Forum, former Director of Public Policy and Government Relations at the Lesbian, Gay, Bisexual and Transgender Community Center in New York City, affiliate of the Social Transformation Project, and co-founder/co-chair/delegate for the We Belong Together Campaign. In 2017, she served as Smith College's Activist-in-Residence. She has served on the boards of Queers for Economic Justice and Generations Ahead, acted as a spokesperson for the National Coalition for Immigrant Women's Rights, and has written for Open Society Foundations, Huffington Post, Washington Post, and scholarly journals, including Barnard Center for Research on Women's Scholar & Feminist Online and UC Berkeley's California Journal of Politics and Policy.

== Early life ==
Yeung was born in Hong Kong and came to the United States with her parents in 1977. (C-SPAN, 1:45 ) She was raised in Brooklyn, New York. She came out as a lesbian in 1991, when she was in high school. At the height of the ACT UP movement, she started advocating for queer sexual health. She also took action around environmental justice, working with Amnesty International and the Red Cross.

== Education ==
Yeung earned a Bachelor's degree at New York University. During her tenure, she became involved in reproductive justice, conducting HIV/ AIDS prevention education and advocacy. Yeung went on to earn her Master's in Public Administration at Baruch College.

== Career ==
Yeung began her professional endeavors in the role of Youth Worker Lesbian, Gay, Bisexual and Transgender Community Center in New York City, where she was worked with youth to counteract bullying in schools. She also worked for the center's Youth Enrichment Services Program as Coordinator of Youth & Training Services and as Director of Public Policy and Government Relations. In total, she spent ten years with the organization. In 2003, she co-produced the documentary I Look Up to the Sky Now, a film about LGBT youth in New York City. In 2005, she served as moderator at the Astoria LGBT Community Center's mayoral forum.

In joining the National Asian Pacific American Women's Forum as executive director in 2008, Yeung headed many initiatives aligned with the organization's mission of advocating for "social justice and human rights for Asian American and Pacific Islander (AAPI) women and girls." She spent eight years as executive director.

In 2012, Yeung was a speaker for the workshops "Reproductive Rights at the Intersection of Class, Race and Immigration Status" and "Wolves in Sheeps' Clothing: Sexual Health as Wedge Issues in Communities of Color and Among Young People" at Facing Race, a national conference organized by Race Forward: The Center for Racial Justice Innovation. She also worked on the National Asian American Survey, co-creating the presentation "Unsilencing the Voices of Asian Americans and Pacific Islanders: A Briefing About National Polling of AAPIs in the United States" with Karthick Ramakrishnan. In addition, she was a featured speaker at the Asian Americans Advancing Justice's National Asian American Survey release in Washington, D.C., appearing along five other Asian American leaders selected--Norman Y. Mineta, Deepa Iyer, Mee Moua, Karthick Ramakrishnan, and Taeku Lee. In August 2012, she appeared as part of a panel discussion, aired on C-SPAN, at the Center for American Progress.

On May 8, 2013, Yeung and 14 other Asian American and Pacific Islander national leaders met with President Barack Obama at the White House to discuss immigration reform and affordable, accessible healthcare.

In 2014, Yeung collaborated with Cornell Law School Clinical Professor of Law, Sital Kalantry, in directing a team of researchers, advocates, and students to create a report incorporating United States Census data, as well as independent research, on sex selection among Asian Americans engaging in "gender balancing" within their family structures. Also in 2014, Yeung spoke as part of the panel "Embracing the Entirety of Families Lived Experiences" at the Compassionate Communities Conference.

Additionally, she was a featured speaker at the Facing Race conference's "Racing Up Your Movement" workshop and a speaker at 18 Million Rising's first public forum online for their #NotYourAsianSidekick campaign called #NotYourAsianSidekick: The Past, Present, and Future of Asian American Grassroots.

In 2015, Yeung, at the helm of the National Asian Pacific American Women's Forum, engaged in activism surrounding workers' rights, occupational safety, and wage theft protections for nail salon workers, coordinating with New York Governor Andrew Cuomo to expand workers' protections and education in the industry. She also opposed, as part of the We Belong Together Campaign, bills put before the House Judiciary Committee, H.R. 1148, the Michael Davis Jr. in Honor of State and Local Law Enforcement Act; H.R. 1149, the Protection of Children Act of 2015; H.R. 1153, the Asylum Reform and Border Protection Act of 2015; and H.R. 1147, the Legal Workforce Act. On April 14, 2015, she appeared at the hearing "Oversight of U.S. Immigration and Customs Enforcement" before the Committee on the Judiciary of the House of Representatives. There, she and Andrea Cristina Mercado submitted

In 2016, Yeung delivered the keynote address at Take Root, a conference with a focus on "reproductive justice for students, academics, practitioners, [and] advocates." She was also a featured speaker at the National Organization for Women's annual conference.

In 2017, Yeung was a speaker at the Civil Liberties and Public Policy Conference. The same year, in celebration of Asian American & Pacific Islander Heritage Month, the Reproductive Health Access Project recognized Yeung for her social justice work. She also served throughout the year as Smith College's Activist-in-Residence. Also in 2017, she was a featured speaker alongside Sandra Criswell and Sujatha Jesudason at Smith College's Steinem Initiative panel discussion "Visions for Reproductive Justice: Resistance & Rebellion 2017 and Beyond." Furthermore, Yeung delivered the keynote address at the Japanese American Citizens' League's Eastern District Council's National Youth/Student Council summit Asian American Feminism: Not Your Asian Sidekick. In March 2017, Yeung was bestowed with a Community Catalyst Award from the National Queer Asian Pacific Islander Alliance.

In September 2018, Yeung spoke at Keep Marching: How Every Woman Can Take Action & Change Our World, a Moms Rising discussion organized by MomsRising Together, a 501(c)(4) social welfare organization, and MomsRising Education Fund, a 501(c)(3) public charity. She was also serving as Executive Editor for the Asian Pacific American Advocates' newsletter.

In 2019, Yeung was a keynote speaker at St. Cloud State University's Power in Diversity Leadership Conference.

== Scholarly works ==
=== As author ===
- Reproductive and Genetic Justice, Scholar & Feminist Online, Barnard Center for Research on Women (2007, 2011, 2012)

=== As co-author ===
- Perspectives among a Diverse Sample of Women on the Possibility of Obtaining Oral Contraceptives Over the Counter: A Qualitative Study, Women's Health Issues, Volume 26, Issue 2 (2016)
- Replacing Myths With Facts: Sex Selective Abortion Laws in the United States, Cornell Legal Studies Research Paper No. 14-34 (2014)
- Courting the Asian American Electorate: What Do They Care About?, UC Berkeley California Journal of Politics and Policy (2014)

=== As contributor ===
- Working at the Intersections: LGBTQ Nonprofit Staff and the Racial Leadership Gap by Sean Thomas-Breitfeld and Frances Kunreuthe (2016)
- Sex-Selective Abortion Bans: Anti-Immigration or Anti-Abortion? by Sital Kalantry, Cornell University Law School (2015)
- Desiring Change Report, Scholar & Feminist Online, Barnard Center for Research on Women

== Articles ==
=== As author ===
- "How Asian American women became the target of anti-abortion activism," Washington Post (2015)

=== As co-author ===
- "Washington Sex-Selective Abortion Ban Will Fuel False Stereotypes Against Asian-American Women," The Stranger (2016)
- "By Allowing Racial Profiling in Arizona, the Supreme Court Undermines the Well-Being of Women and Families," Huffington Post (2012)
- "Reproductive Justice and Lesbian, Gay, Bisexual & Transgender Liberation," The Pro-Choice Public Education Project

== Radio and podcasts ==
Date	Show	Episode	Role
2018	Breaking Through with Kristen Rowe-Finkbeiner	"How To Hack Politics for the Good!"	Guest
May 15, 2017	Breaking Through with Kristen Rowe-Finkbeiner	"Liberty & Justice for Everyone"	Guest
Feb. 5, 2013	NPR's Tell Me More	"Overhauling Immigration: Asians Matter Too"	Guest

== Awards and recognition ==
- Community Catalyst Award recipient, National Queer Asian Pacific Islander Alliance (2017)
- Smith College Activist-in-Residence (2017)
- Asian American & Pacific Islander Heritage Month honoree, designated by the Reproductive Health Access Project (2017)
- Honoree at Ms. Foundation's annual Gloria Awards (2014)
- Making A Difference for Women Award, National Council for Research on Women (2012)
- Honoree via New York City Council (2007)
