= We Belong (disambiguation) =

"We Belong" is a 1984 song by Pat Benatar.

We Belong may also refer to:

- "We Belong" (Sheppard song), 2016
- "We Belong" (Dove Cameron song), 2020
- "We Belong", by Toni Gonzaga from You Complete Me (2006)

== See also ==
- We Belong Together (disambiguation)
