= Charles Yeung Siu-cho =

Hong Kong rural politician (born 1934)

Charles Yeung OBE JP
- 楊少初
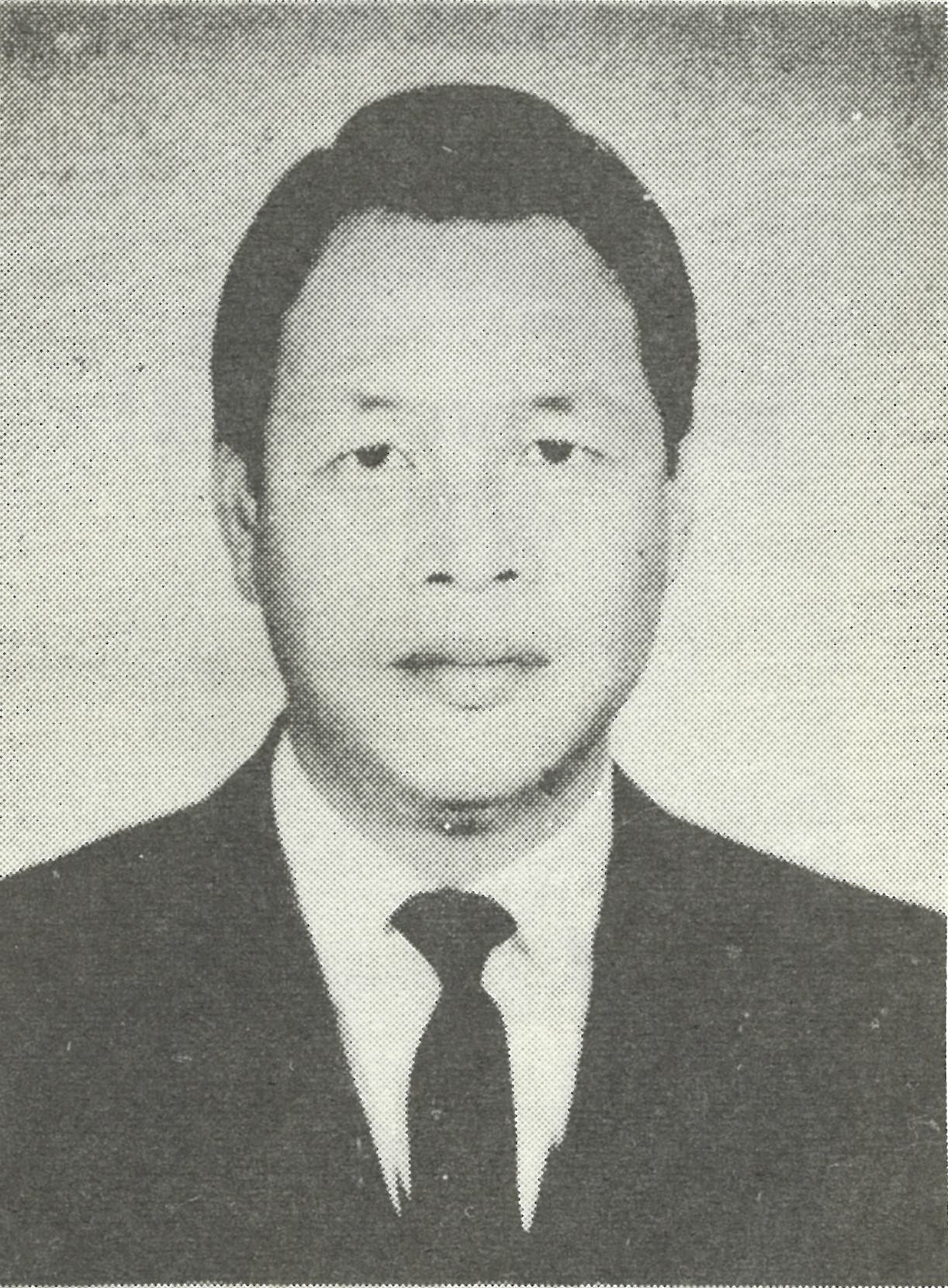

Member of the Legislative Council
- In office 5 October 1977 – 4 October 1984
- Appointed by: Murray MacLehose

Personal details
- Born: December 19, 1934 (age 91) Yeung Uk Tsuen, Shap Pat Heung, New Territories, British Hong Kong
- Party: Reform Club
- Education: University of Hong Kong; University of London (LL.B.)
- Occupation: Solicitor

Charles Yeung Siu-cho, OBE, JP (Chinese: 楊少初; born 19 December 1934) is the first New Territories rural leader to become solicitor and to be appointed to the Legislative Council of Hong Kong.

Yeung was born in the New Territories, Hong Kong on 19 December 1934 to the rural family in Yeung Uk Tsuen, Shap Pat Heung. Graduated from the King's College, Hong Kong and subsequently the University of Hong Kong with a law degree, he went aboard to the study at the University of London and received professional qualifications. In 1961, he returned to Hong Kong and practiced law as a solicitor. He ran for the Urban Council in the 1965 municipal election as a candidate for the Reform Club of Hong Kong but was not elected.

He was also actively involved in the rural politics and had been village representative and member of the Heung Yee Kuk, the powerful organ for the indigenous inhabitants' interests. He was first made New Territories Justice of the Peace in 1974. In 1979, he was appointed to the Legislative Council of Hong Kong by Governor Sir Murray MacLehose, becoming the first legislator with rural background. In 1980, he was awarded Officer of the Order of the British Empire for his services in Hong Kong.
