= Wong Nai Tun Tsuen =

Village in Hong Kong

Coordinates: 22.417696°N 114.021762°E

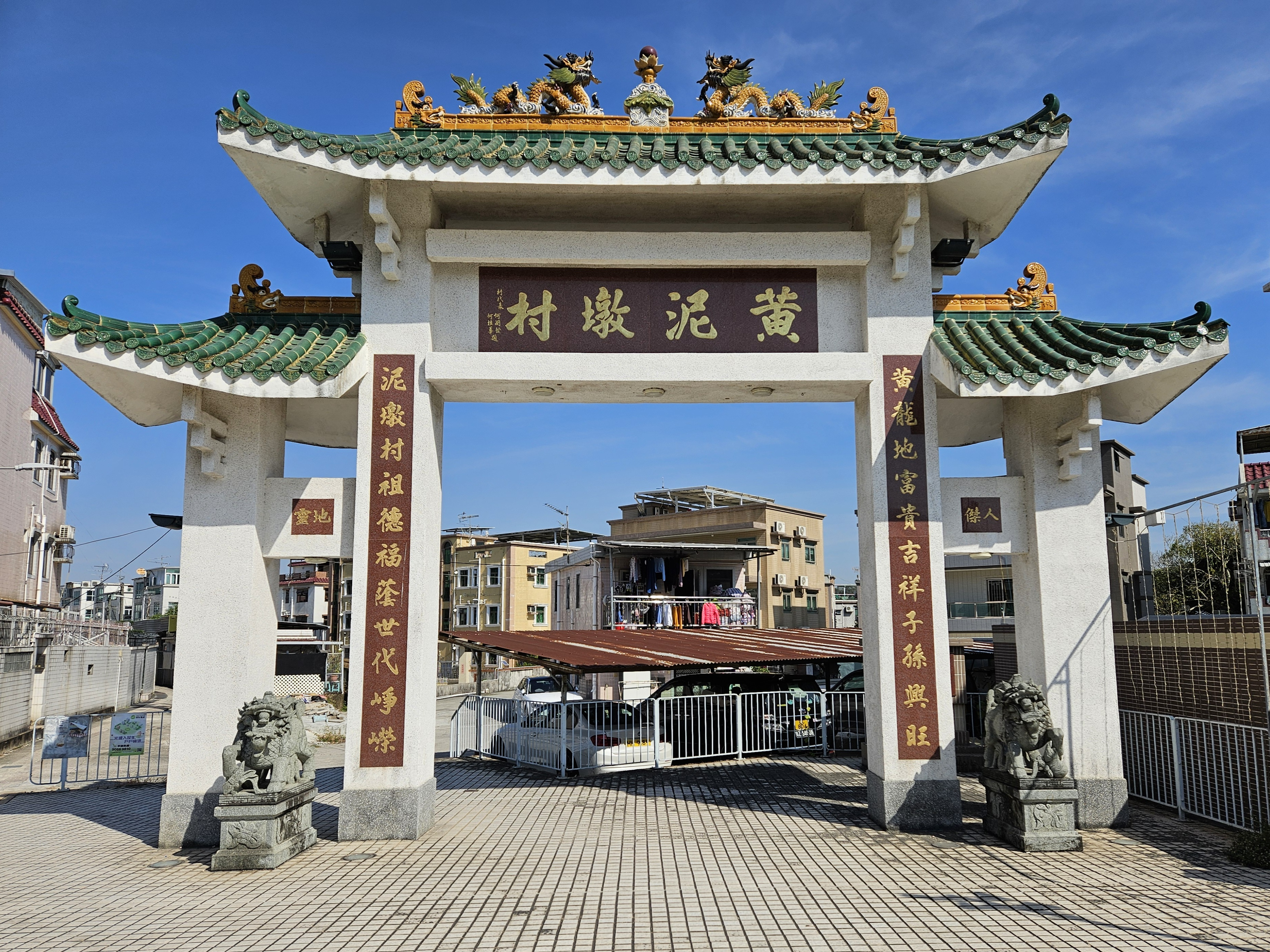
Archway of Wong Nai Tun Tsuen in December 2023.

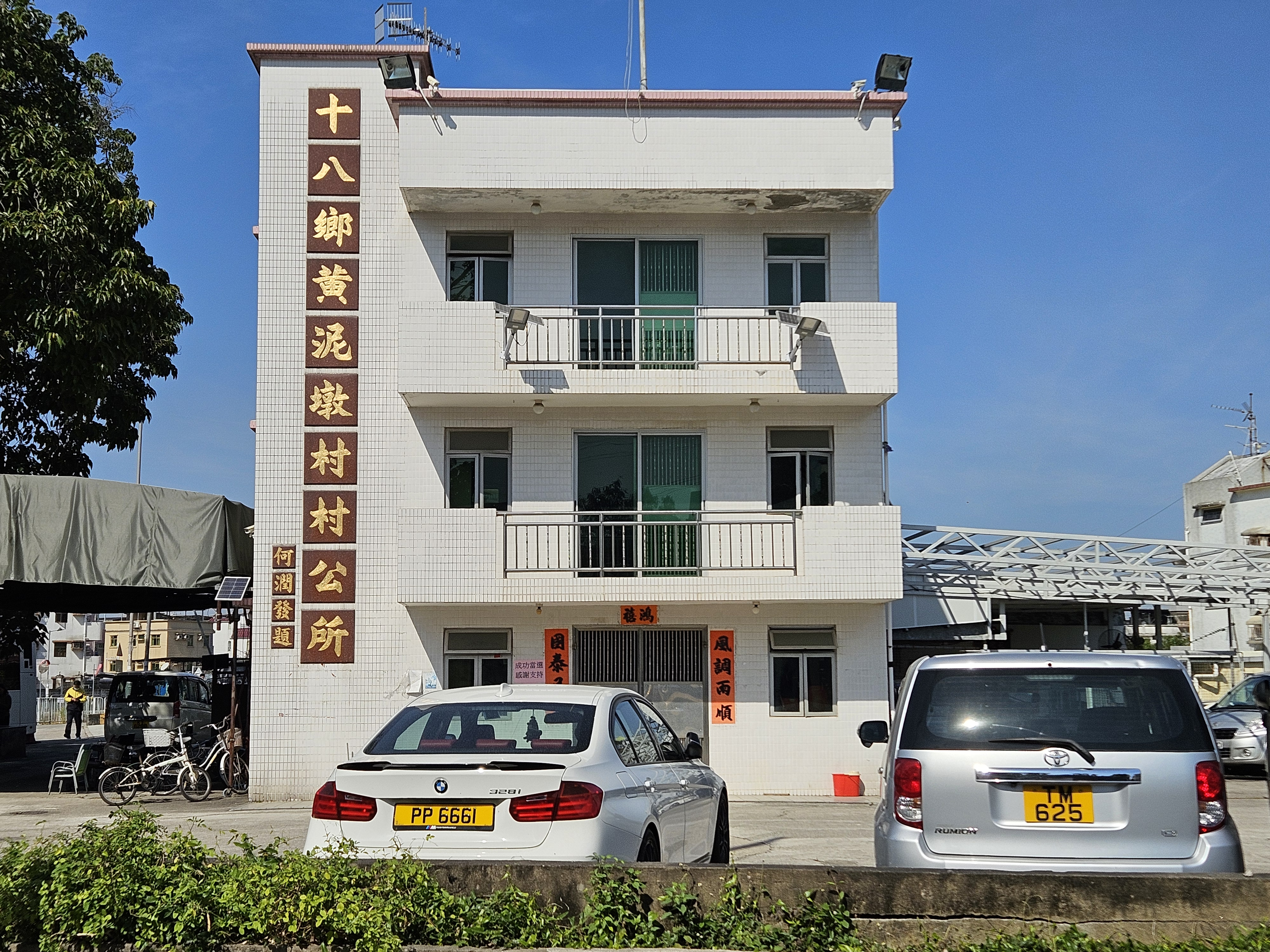
Wong Nai Tun Tsuen Village Office in December 2023.

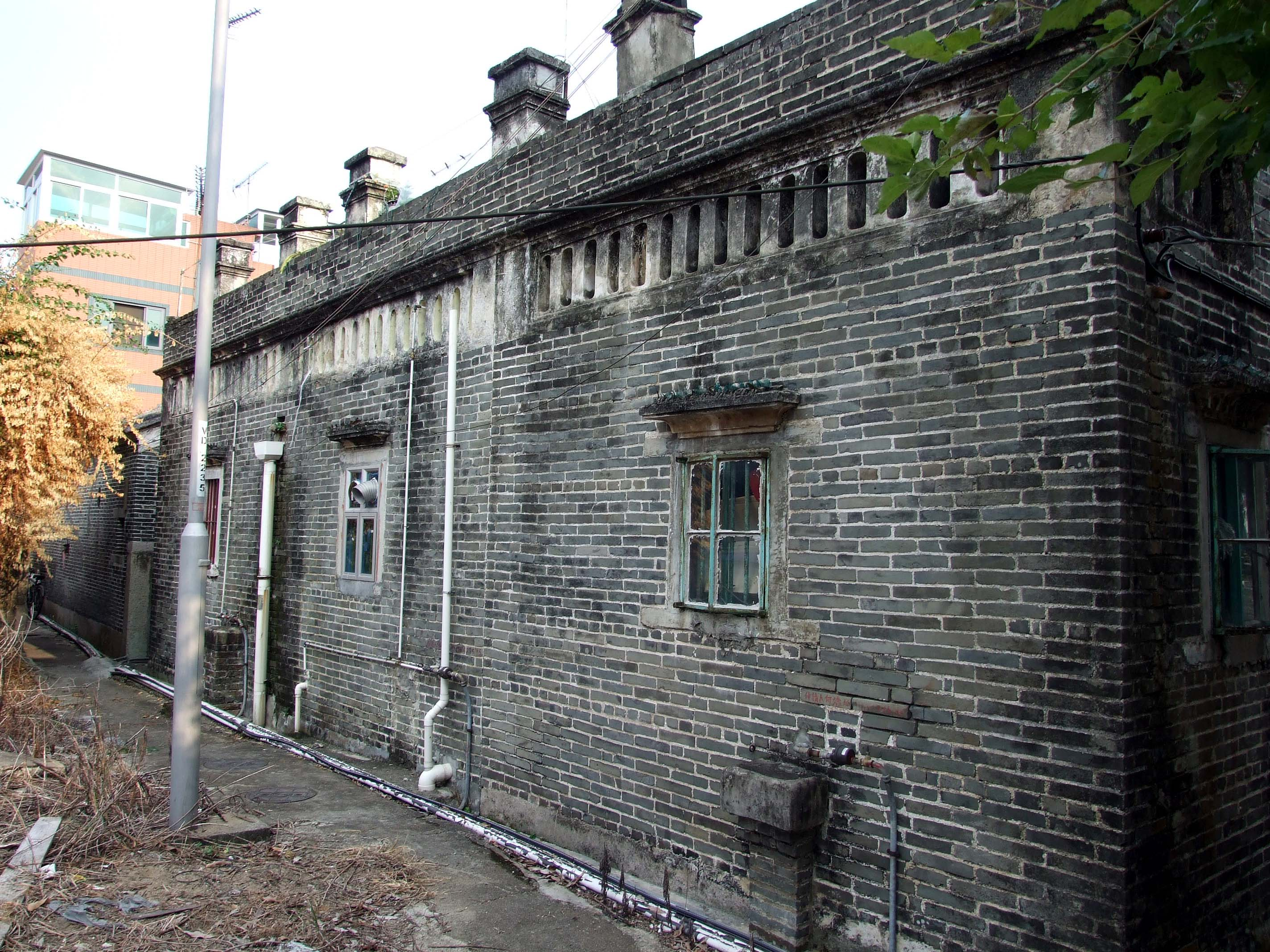
Nos. 12-14 Wong Nai Tun Tsuen.

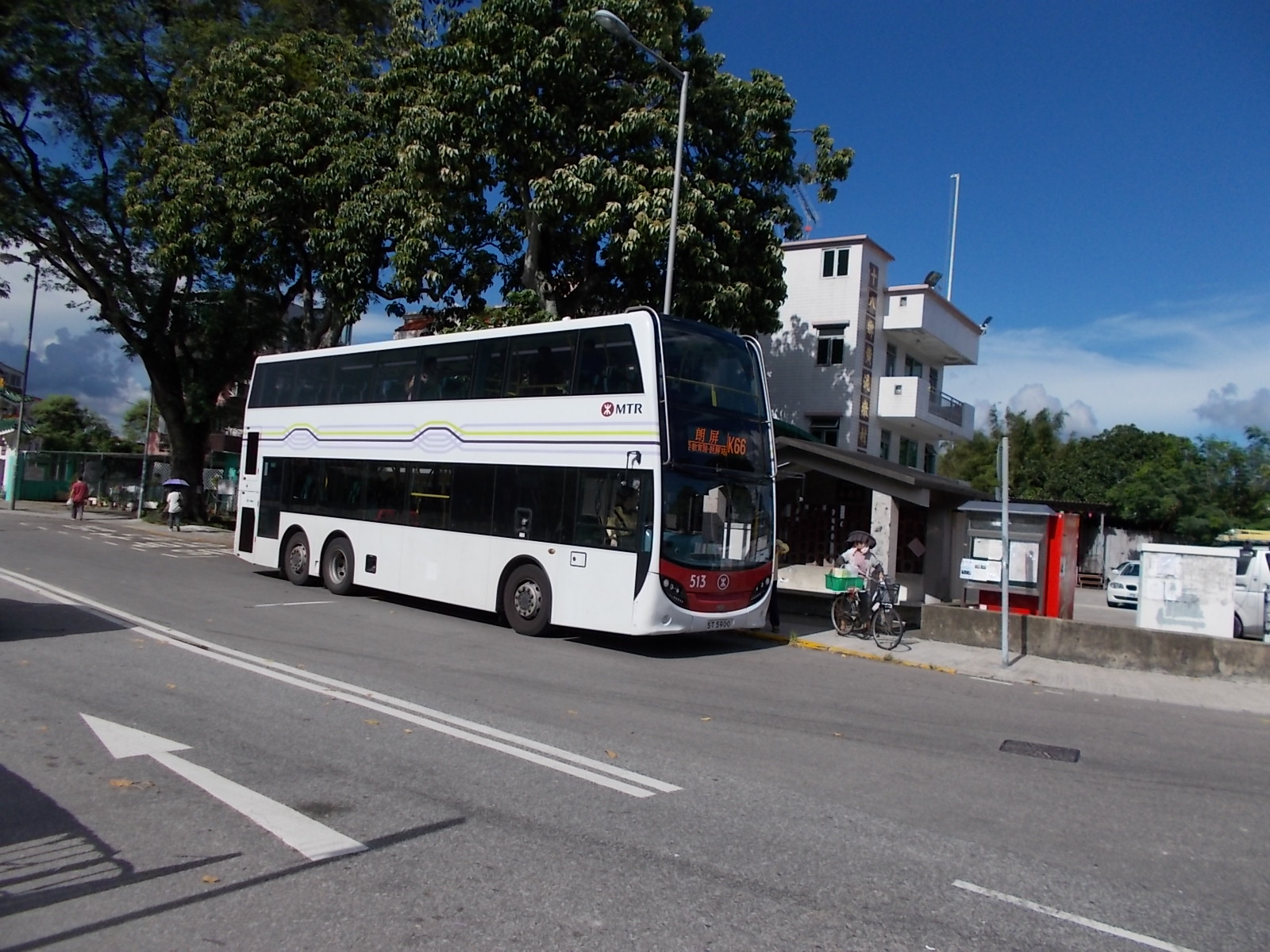
Tai Tong Wong Nai Tun Tsuen Bus Terminus (大棠黃泥墩村巴士總站) on Kiu Hing Road (僑興路) in Wong Nai Tun Tsuen. The village office is visible in the background.

Wong Nai Tun Tsuen (Chinese: 黃泥墩村) is a small village situated in the area of Shap Pat Heung, located in Tai Tong, which is situated in the south of Yuen Long, in the New Territories in Hong Kong.

== Administration ==
Wong Nai Tun Tsuen is a recognized village under the New Territories Small House Policy.

== Features ==
Wong Nai Tun Tsuen is close to the Lychee Mountain, which is situated in Tai Tong. The village comprises the offices for Shap Pat Heung, and also a little restaurant and a main bus stop connecting both sides of Yuen Long.

== Education ==
Wong Nai Tun is in Primary One Admission (POA) School Net 73. Within the school net are multiple aided schools (operated independently but funded with government money) and one government school: South Yuen Long Government Primary School (南元朗官立小學).
