= Tai Tong =

Area of Hong Kong

Coordinates: 22°25′N 114°01′E

- Traditional Chinese: 大棠
Transcriptions
Yue: Cantonese
- Yale Romanization: Daaih tòhng
- Jyutping: Daai6 tong4

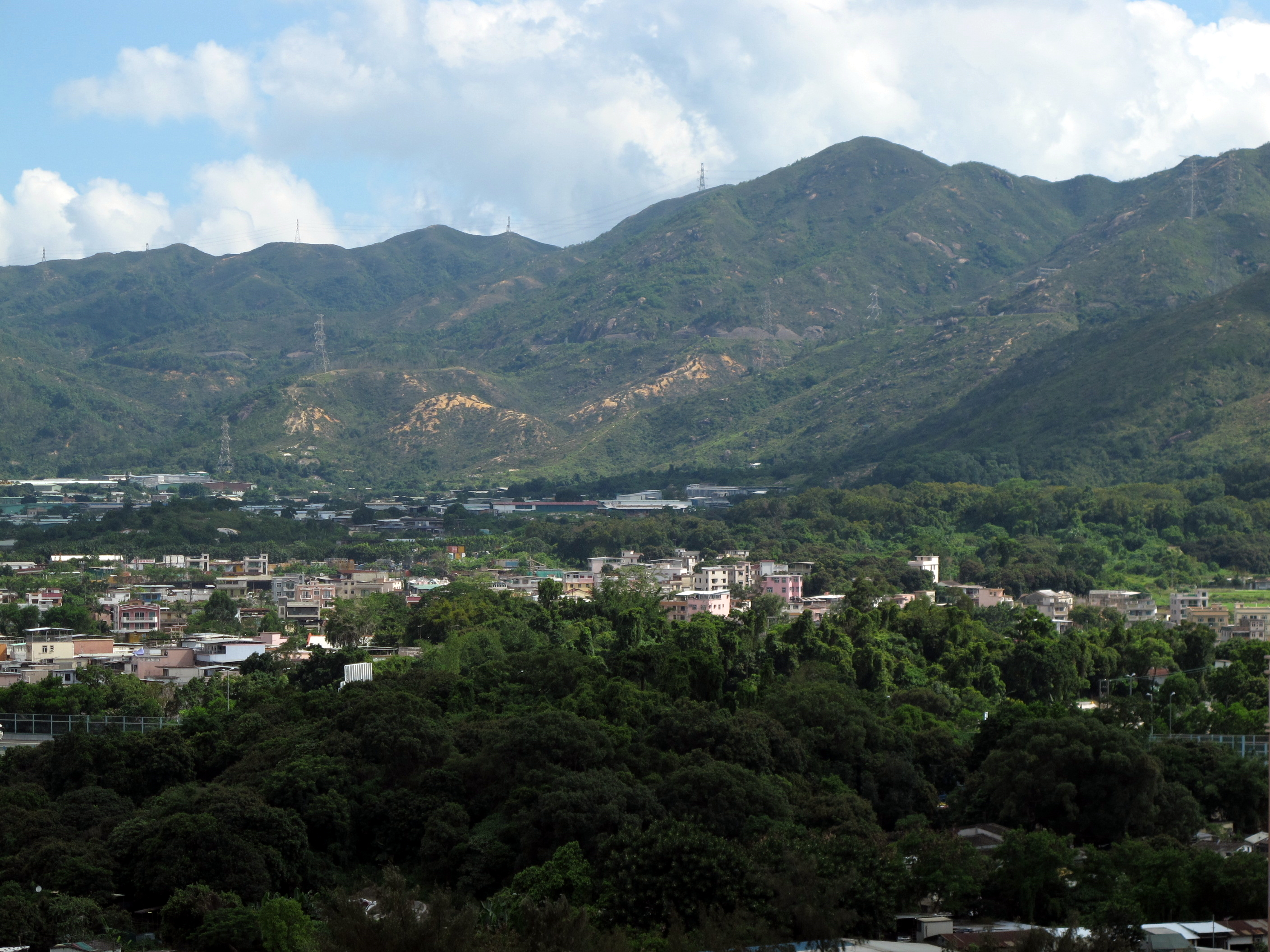
View of Tai Tong in June 2010

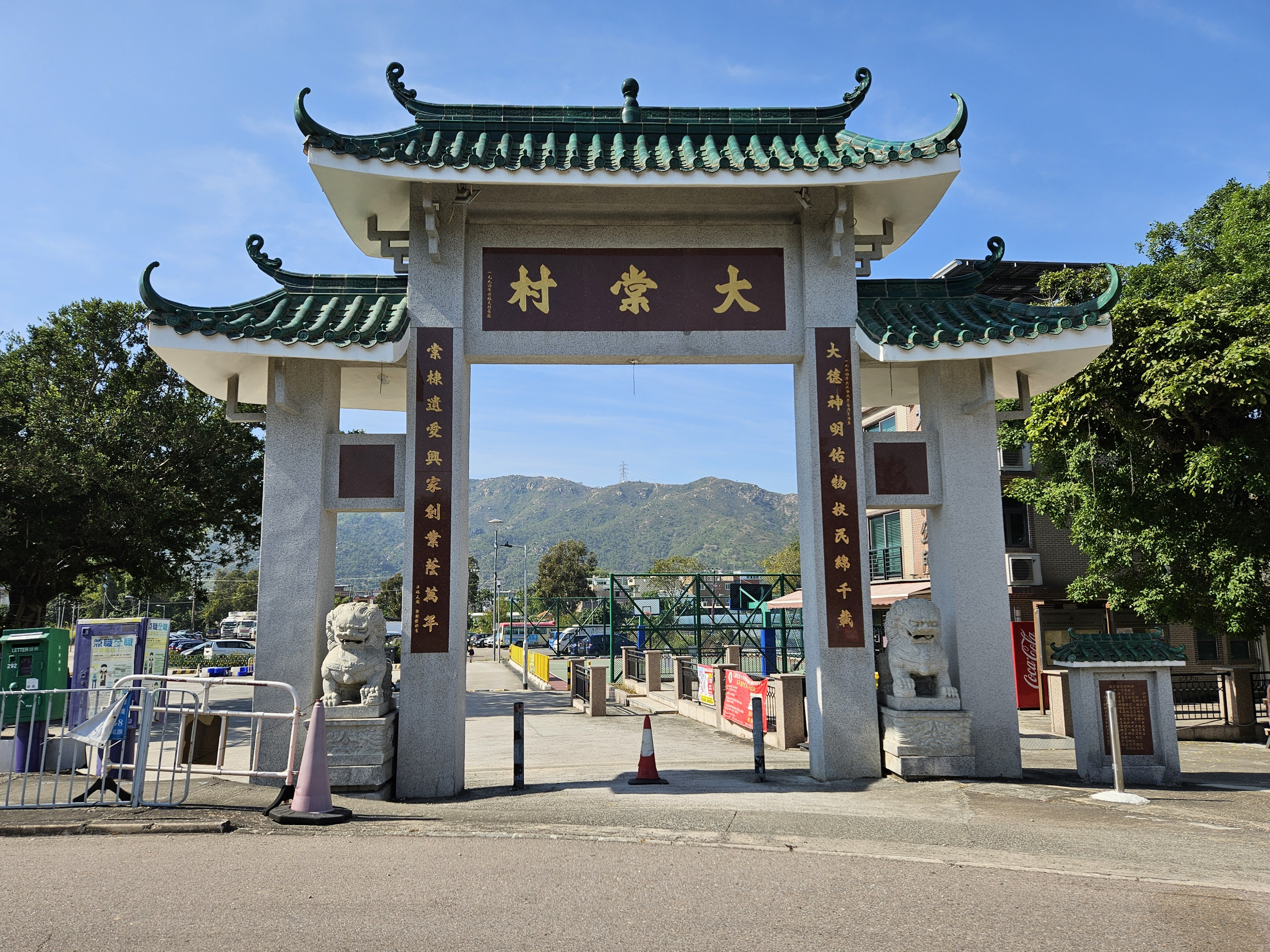
Archway of Tai Tong Tsuen in December 2023

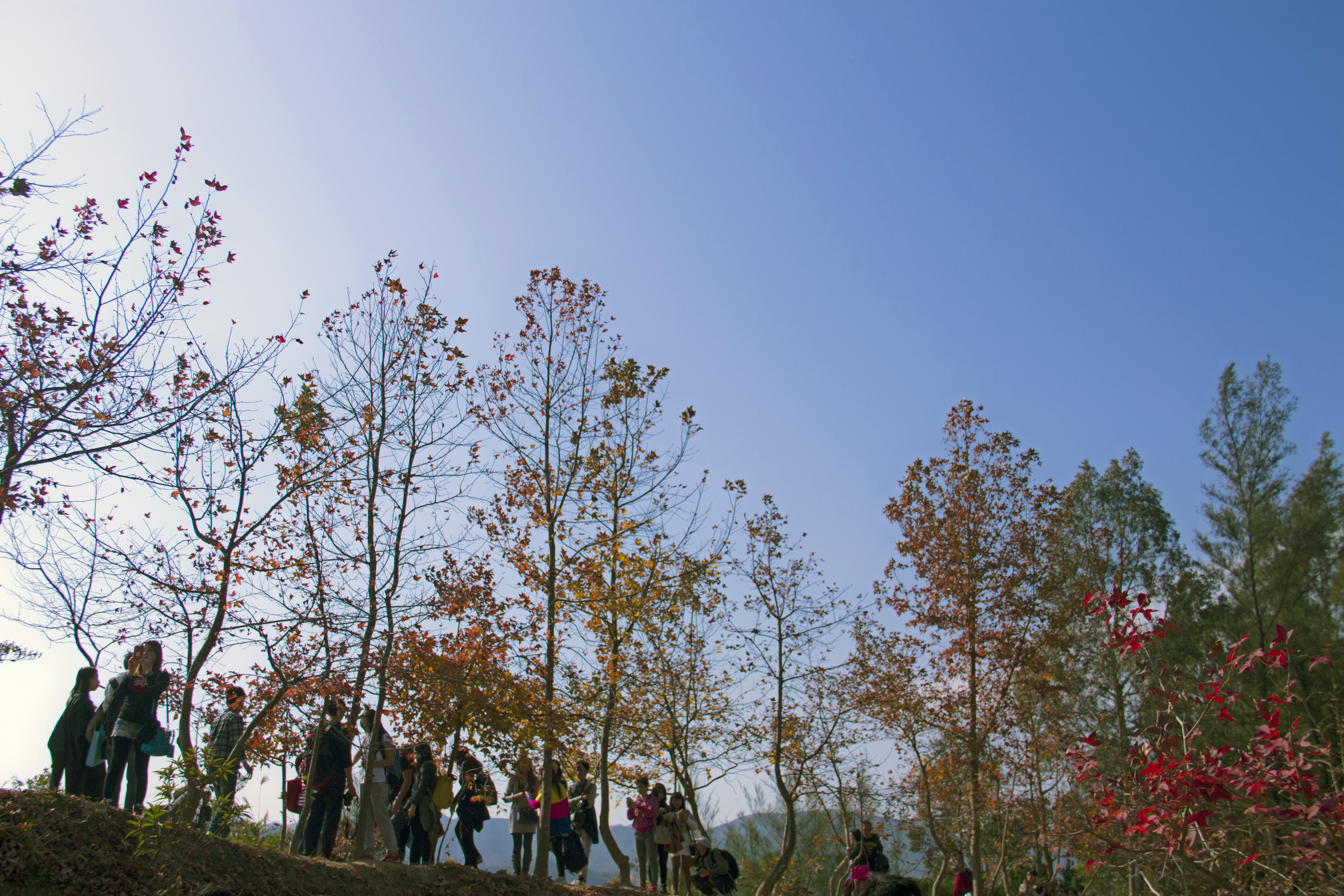
Autumn Leaves attract many people to take pictures during winter. Taken in January 2015.

Tai Tong is an area southwest of Shap Pat Heung, in Yuen Long District, in the northwestern part of Hong Kong.

Tai Tong Tsuen (大棠村) is located in the area.

== Administration ==
Tai Tong Tsuen is a recognized village under the New Territories Small House Policy.

== Features ==
Tai Tong has a mountain called Lychee mountain. It has been a prime spot for Hong Kong programs.

== Transport ==
There are 3 main roads connecting the 3 main sections of Tai Tong. Tai Tong Road, Kung Um Road and Tai Shu Ha Road North and West. Tai Shui Ha Section's only transportation is GMB route 73A (Yuen Long Fook Hong Street to Sung Shan Sun Tsuen) and GMB 73 (Long Ping ST. to Sung Shan Sun Tsuen). In the Kung Um Section, the only GMB line operating in the following section is route 39 (Fung Cheng Road to Kung Um Pak Sha). During rush hour, there are special departures of this following route which connects Kung Um Pak Sha to Yuen Long Station. In Tai Tong's Main section, Tai Tong Road, an RMB which connects Wong Nai Tun Tsuen to Hung Min Court (Near Citimall), operates here. There is another RMB line which connects Wong Nai Tun Tsuen to Yuen Long Station. There are also 3 MTRB lines and 1 KMB line which operate in this section, which are K66, K66A, K66S, and 68R. Route K66 connects Wong Nai Tun Tsuen to Long Ping Bus Terminus (Long Ping Estate) Via Long Ping Station. During Morning Rush hours, there are special departures of K66 which stops operation at Long Ping Station, and does not continue journey to Long Ping Bus Terminus. Route K66A and K66S only operates from late November to early January where there are extremely high demands of tourists visiting the Tai Tong Sweet Gum Woods. These two buses operate from Tai Tong Shan Road to Long Ping Station. K66A omits all stops from K66 except from the "Tai Tong Roundabout" Station, while K66S does not. Route 68R only operates 2 days of the year (December 24th and 25th) This route connects Yuen Long YOHO mall (Yuen Long Station) to Tai Tong Shan Road. There are no in between stops on this route.

== Education ==
Tai Tong Tsuen is in Primary One Admission (POA) School Net 73. Within the school net are multiple aided schools (operated independently but funded with government money) and one government school: South Yuen Long Government Primary School (南元朗官立小學).

== See also ==
- Tai Lam Country Park
- Wong Nai Tun Tsuen
- Yeung Ka Tsuen
