= Yeung Ka Tsuen =

Village in Tai Tong, Yuen Long, Hong Kong

Yeung Ka Tsuen Chinese: 楊家村
- Village
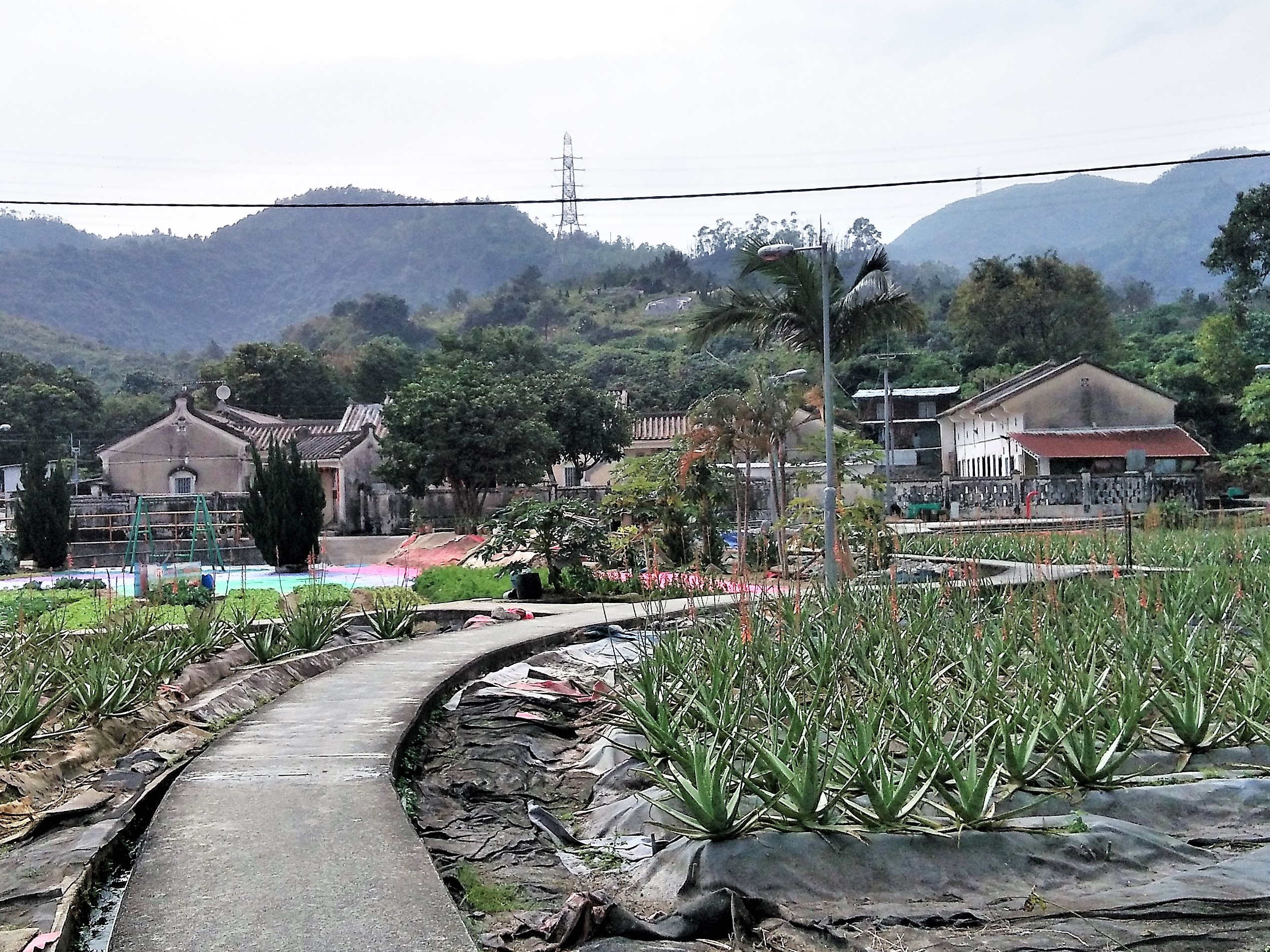
- Sik Lo in Yeung Ka Tsuen.

- Location within Hong Kong
- Coordinates: 22.411001°N 114.02063°E
- Country: People's Republic of China
- Special administrative region: Hong Kong
- District: Yuen Long District
- Area: Tai Tong, Shap Pat Heung
- Time zone: UTC+8:00 (HKT)

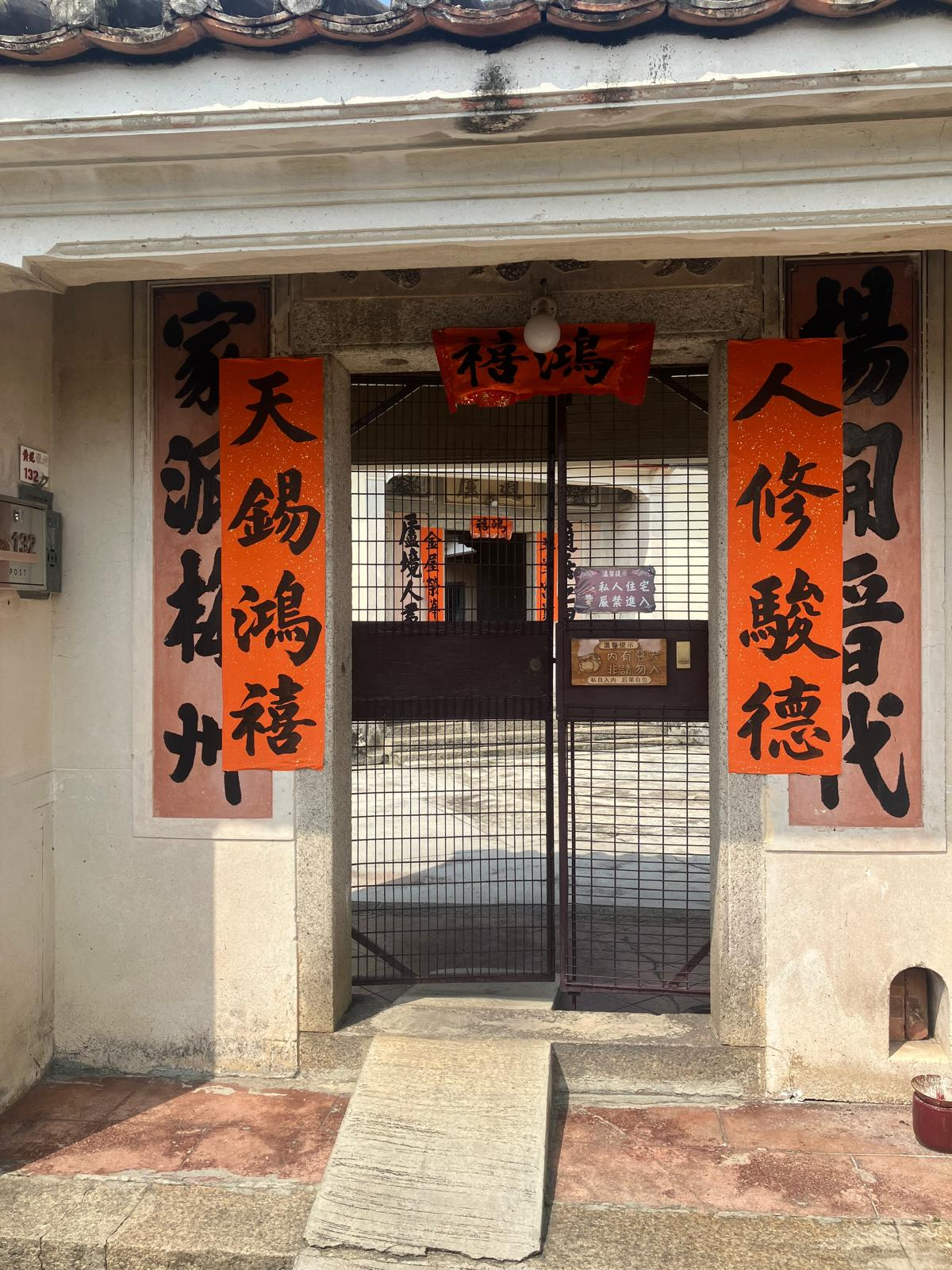
Entrance gate of Sik Lo.

Yeung Ka Tsuen (Chinese: 楊家村) is a village in Tai Tong, Shap Pat Heung, Yuen Long District, Hong Kong.

== History ==
In the summer of 1942, when the Japanese army was reported to have come to raid the area, the guerrillas quickly evacuated with their firearms and hid themselves in the Tanchai Mountain behind Sulu. When the Japanese army failed to find the guerrillas, they took Yang Zhunan away and imprisoned him for more than a month. The Japanese tortured him to force him to give information about the guerrillas, but he refused, insisting that he did not know.

== Education ==
Yeung Ka Tsuen is in Primary One Admission (POA) School Net 73. Within the school net are multiple aided schools (operated independently but funded with government money) and one government school: South Yuen Long Government Primary School (南元朗官立小學).
