= Pui-Kuen Yeung =

Hong Kong-American engineer and academic

- Born: Yeung
- Education: University of Hong Kong
- Occupations: Engineer, academic
- Awards: Fellow of the American Physical Society

Pui-Kuen Yeung (P.K. Yeung) is an engineer and academic.

== Education ==
Yeung earned his Bachelor of Science in mechanical engineering followed by a Master of Philosophy in 1984, both from the University of Hong Kong. He then went on to do his PhD at Cornell University under Stephen B. Pope. His work culminated with the publication of his thesis titled "A Study of Lagrangian Statistics in Stationary Isotropic Turbulence Using Direct Numerical Simulations" in 1989.

== Career ==
Yeung joined the faculty of the Georgia Institute of Technology in 1992. In 2006, he was elected a fellow of the American Physical Society "[f]or insightful contributions to the understanding and modeling of similarity scaling in turbulence and the mixing of passive scalars, especially the study of Lagrangian statistics and dispersion in turbulence through high-resolution simulations addressing Reynolds number and Schmidt number dependencies."
