= Benjamin F. Young =

Canadian soldier

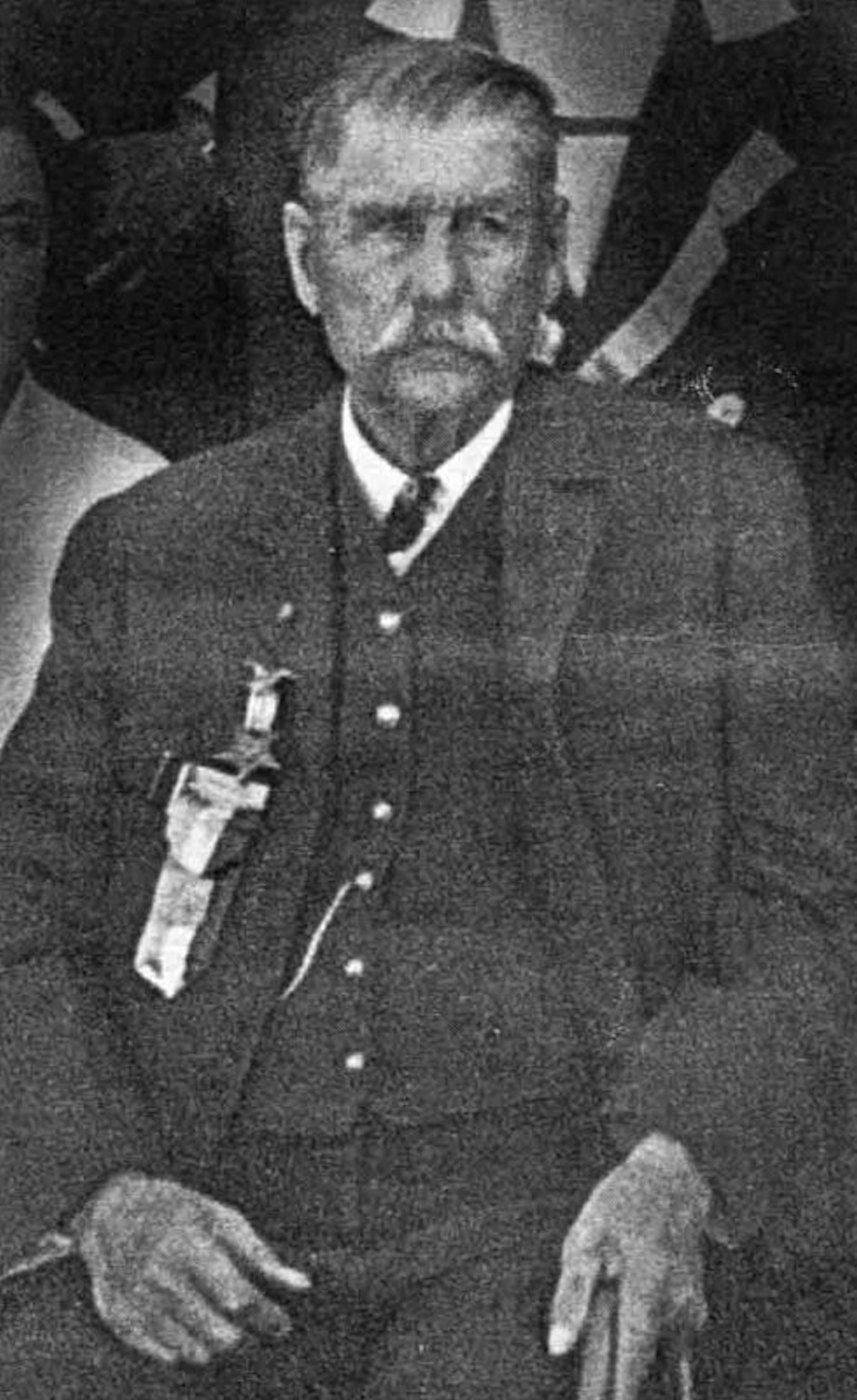
- Born: 27 June 1844
- Died: 27 January 1927 (aged 82); Los Angeles, California
- Military career
- Unit: 1st Michigan Sharpshooters
- Conflicts: Siege of Petersburg
- Awards: Medal of Honor

Benjamin F. Young (June 27, 1844 - January 27, 1927) was a Canadian born soldier who fought in the Union Army in the American Civil War. He was awarded the Medal of Honor for his actions at the Siege of Petersburg, Virginia.

== Biography ==
Young was born in Canada in 1841. Little was known of his life until his actions at the Siege of Petersburg. During the war he served as a Corporal in the 1st Michigan Sharpshooters. Benjamin F. Young died on 27 January 1927.

== Medal of Honor citation ==
The President of the United States of America, in the name of Congress, takes pleasure in presenting the Medal of Honor to Corporal Benjamin F. Young, United States Army, for extraordinary heroism on 17 June 1864, while serving with 1st Michigan Sharpshooters, in action at Petersburg, Virginia, for capture of flag of 35th North Carolina Infantry (Confederate States of America).

Date Issued: 1 December 1864
