= Wei-Jun Jean Yeung =

Taiwanese sociologist and demographer

Wei-Jun Jean Yeung is a Taiwanese sociologist and demographer. She is a professor at the Asia Research Institute of the National University of Singapore (NUS). She chairs the Family, Children, and Youth Research Cluster in the Faculty of Arts and Social Sciences at NUS.

== Early life and education ==
Wei-Jun Jean Yeung was born in Taiwan. She received her B.A. degree in sociology from National Taiwan University and her Ph.D. degree in sociology from the University of Alberta.

== Academic career ==
Wei-Jun Jean Yeung has taught in University of Michigan and New York University. Currently, she is a professor at the Department of Sociology and the Asia Research Institute, National University of Singapore. She serves as an academic advisor to the Institute of Social Science Studies in Peking University and a member of the board of trustees for the Institute of Southeast Asia Studies (ISEAS) in Singapore.

== Research, honours and awards ==
Wei-Jun Jean Yeung is affiliated with the China Economic Research Center in Peking University, the National Poverty Center of the School of Public Policy and the Institute for Social Research in the University of Michigan, and the RAND Policy Research Corporation. She is a co-principal investigator of one of the longest-running social science longitudinal surveys - Panel Study of Income Dynamics. She serves as an academic advisor to the Institute of Social Science Studies in Peking University. She is secretary/treasurer for the section of Children and Youth of the American Sociological Association.

Yeung has received numerous awards, including those from the National Science Foundation, National Institute on Aging, and National Institute of Child Health and Human Development. Yeung's current research and teaching focus on intergenerational studies, family and children’s well-being and policies, social inequality, and China’s socioeconomic and demographic transition.

Yeung's publications appear in top scientific journals and include topics such as parental investment in children, work and family balance, ethnic disparities in educational attainment, poverty, and family wealth. Her most cited work includes those that address the impact of economic stress on families and the fatherhood issues. She has served on the editorial board for the Journal of Marriage and Family and Child Development and on several scientific review committees for the government. Her international experiences also include advising on large-scale longitudinal surveys in Asia, Europe, and Australia and to the United Nations.

== Major research projects ==
=== Panel study of income dynamics ===
Yeung is a co-principal investigator of the PSID, one of the longest-running nationally representative study of American families that was initiated in 1968. The study has a genealogical design that follows the original family members and their grown children when they establish their independent households. The PSID is one of the richest data archives in the social science history, with its contents including economic, demographic, health, education and child development data about American families. As of 2009, 37 waves of the PSID data, containing more than 50,000 variables, were assembled from more than 8,000 families and nearly 70,000 individuals.

=== China's economic transition and children's well-being ===
This project examines the relationship between industrialization and children's well-being measured by education and child mortality in China. Our analysis is based on micro census data collected in 1982, 1990, and 2000 and various industrial surveys. These data allow us to control for year and county fixed effects.

=== Intergenerational stratification on children's achievement ===
This research investigates factors contributing to the substantial achievement gaps in high school children. Yeung and Persell focus on four important clusters of factors: (1) intergenerational resources, 2) family interactions, 3) racial inequalities in students' school and neighborhoods, and 4) how racial inequalities in various contexts interact with one another to affect children's cognitive abilities. The analysis is based on longitudinal data on family histories from the Panel Study of Income Dynamics and its Child Development Supplements conducted in 1997 and 2003 as well as on geographic information from census data and school district data over the last three decades.

=== Childhood consumption and children's education and emotional well-being ===
This research is supported by funding from the National Institute for Child Health and Human Development to support work in American fathers' involvement with children. The goals of this project are (1) to describe how paternal involvement with children, in the form of time, financial and psychological resources, differ by family structure, (2) to test hypotheses about factors that affect paternal involvement behavior, and (3) to investigate how children's psychological and cognitive well-being relates to fathers' attitudes and involvement behavior. The research will be based on data from the Panel Study of Income Dynamics (PSID), which contains annual data collected since 1968 for a nationally representative sample of American households. Using longitudinal history in the PSID and data from the 1997 Child Development Supplement, this project will assess the extent to which social and economic involvement with children varies with fathers' changing life circumstances.

=== Paternal involvement and child well-being ===
This research is supported by funding from the National Institute for Child Health and Human Development to support work in American fathers' involvement with children. The goals of this project are (1) to describe how paternal involvement with children, in the form of time, financial and psychological resources, differ by family structure, (2) to test hypotheses about factors that affect paternal involvement behavior, and (3) to investigate how children's psychological and cognitive well-being relates to fathers' attitudes and involvement behavior. The research will be based on data from the Panel Study of Income Dynamics (PSID), which contains annual data collected since 1968 for a nationally representative sample of American households. Using longitudinal history in the PSID and data from the 1997 Child Development Supplement, this project will assess the extent to which social and economic involvement with children varies with fathers' changing life circumstances.

=== Caring for elderly parents ===
The National Institute of Aging has funded collaboration between Wei-Jun Jean Yeung and Martha Hill in University of Michigan to examine responses of baby-boom children to the health care needs of their elderly parents and how these responses compare to those of earlier cohorts. Intergenerational transfers to ailing parents are central to this investigation, and a primary interest is in gauging the extent to which changes in children's labor market participation are engendered by providing those transfers. Using a national sample of baby-boomers, both leading edge (born 1945-54) and trailing edge (born 1955-64), and prior cohorts with elderly parents, the analysis aims at examining differences across these groups in terms of: level and type of transfers, actual changes in work hours (short-run and long run), extent to which transfers engendered changes in work hours, and how individual histories of social, economic and demographic circumstances and behaviors relate to these outcomes.

=== Long-term trends in U.S. poverty and welfare dependence ===
With funding received from the National Science Foundation, this project examines the long-term trends of poverty and welfare receipts in U.S. Yeung documented the duration and patterns of poverty and welfare receipt for multiple cohorts of individuals in the Panel Study of Income Dynamics, by different individual and family characteristics such as ethnicity, marital status, and age of the household head. The project also examines intergenerational correlation between childhood poverty and young adult achievement such as educational attainment and welfare status. Parts of the results from this project were used to support the production of the annual report on the indicators of poverty and welfare dependence by the U.S. Department of Health and Human Service, Office of the Assistant Secretary for Planning and Evaluation.

=== Wealth and health: race, assets and child development ===
Yeung and Dalton Conley received a research grant from the National Institute for Child Health and Human Development to examine the link between parental wealth and young children's physical and mental well-being. We intend to investigate how family net worth may mediate or modify the race - child outcome association. The mechanism through which family wealth influences children's health and achievements will be a focus of this study. We will make advantage of data collected in a series of supplemental files to Panel Study of Income Dynamics, including the 1997 Child Development Supplement and family wealth data collected in the years 1984, 1989, 1994, 1999 and 2001.
