= We Belong Together (campaign) =

The We Belong Together Campaign is anchored by the National Domestic Workers Alliance, the Asian Pacific American Women's Forum and other groups throughout the United States. We Belong Together is an initiative that is in the United States, that spreads awareness of immigration laws that impact women and immigration reform. It was formed in 2010 to address issues concerning the female immigrant population in the United States. The campaign offers a gender-basedanalysis and focuses on maintaining nuclear families.

== History ==
The campaign was created on Mother's Day in 2010 after a group of women from the National Domestic Workers Alliance and the Asian Pacific American Women's Forum travelled to Arizona to investigate how the anti-immigrant law SB1070 would impact women, children and families. The women discovered that a large number of families were being separated and deported and a large number of women were suffering from violence, but their immigration status prevented them from seeking help in most of the cases. They argue that women and children are the faces of immigration and thus policies must be implemented that focus on them. We Belong Together mobilizes women to work towards a "common sense" immigration reform to keep families together.

The chairs of the campaign are Andrea Mercado and Miriam Yeung.

== Goals ==
- Advocates for legislation that provides a clear pathway to citizenship for immigrant women
- Acknowledges the contributions that immigrants make to the U.S. economy
- Ensures the safety of women who suffer from violence and domestic abuse
- Offers health services to women that in need
- Secures all families and their reunification

== Campaign ==
We Belong Together is against the exploitation, immobility, and violence against women despite their documentation status. Their main focuses include citizenship, stopping deportation and the separation of families, and providing services for American women.

The issues that We Belong Together focuses on are:

Eligibility for citizenship: Eligibility criteria for women to obtain legal status on their own are close to not possible as most women come to the United States through family-based admissions, rather than through employment admissions, which prevents women's independence.

Work: Immigrant women have fewer opportunities to partake in formal employment. In addition, domestic services are most of the time not acknowledged to have much significance on the economy.

Exploitation: Women are more vulnerable to face exploitation in the workplace than men. Most of the time, women are paid significantly less, work extreme hours, are exposed to hazardous environments, and also suffer from sexual abuse, harassment, and assault in the workplace.

Deportation: Immigrant women who are detained, face the violation of their rights as human beings, such as the lack of due process and separation from families, including their children.

Health: Most immigrant women do not have access to health care services and health insurance due to their undocumented status and/or low income status.

== Programs ==
The programs the We Belong Together Group include:

- Women's Fast for Families
- Wish for the holidays
- 100 Women, 100 Miles March
- Civil disobedience of 100 Women.

During the ACT. FAST. Women's Fast for Families, over 1,000 women fasted for at least 24 hours throughout the United States. The fast ended with a protest on Capital Hill to "feed courage" to lawmakers who refuse to address women's needs within the current immigration system. Wish for the Holidays has taken place every year since 2010 during the holiday season. Wish for the Holidays is when children deliver cookies in the shapes of hearts and letters that were written by children and women for fair immigration reform to be passed in order to keep families together. These letters provide personal narratives from children, women and allies to communicate with congress, lawmakers, and the president how deportation and lack of immigration reform affects them. The 100 Women, 100 Miles Pilgrimage took place on September 15 to 13, 2015 in which 100 women marched from Pennsylvania to Washington D.C. The purpose of this march was to greet the Pope and give him the message of how the immigrant population was suffering from inhumane laws and criminalized by the United States government. The 100 Women Civil Disobedience took place on September 12, 2013, in which over 100 women participated in a civil disobedience act to demand "fair immigration reform." 104 women were arrested for blocking the intersection outside of the Capital Building. 28 of the arrested women were undocumented. This was the largest civil disobedience act in which women came together to address the issue of immigration.

In 2017, children and teens involved in the group used their spring break to protest the immigration policies of Donald Trump.
