= Benjamin Yeung (Canadian businessman) =

Hong Kong-born Canadian real estate developer

Benjamin Yeung is a Hong Kong-born Canadian real estate developer.

== Career ==
Yeung was originally a dentist. He is a real estate developer in Western Canada. The company he works for constructed the Living Shangri-La hotel and the Fairmont Pacific Rim hotel.
