= Yeung Uk Tsuen, Shap Pat Heung =

Village in Yuen Long District, Hong Kong

Coordinates: 22.442403°N 114.042325°E

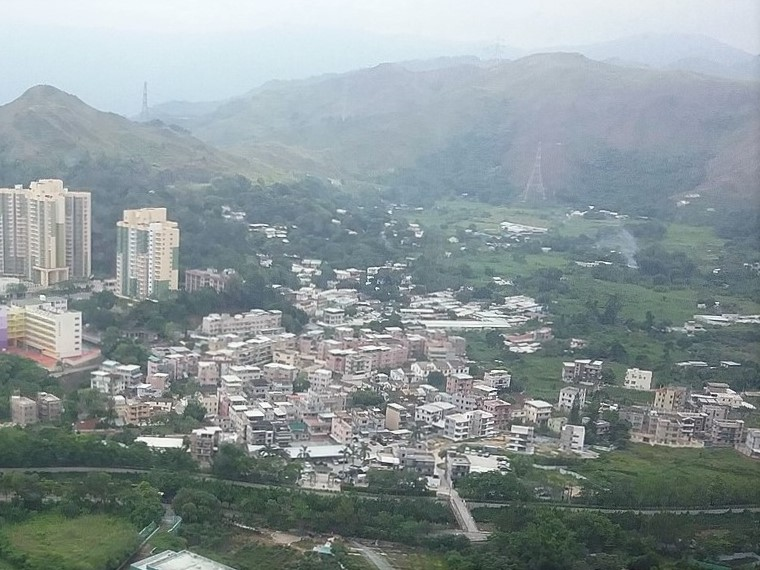
Yeung Uk Tsuen, Shap Pat Heung viewed from Grand Yoho.

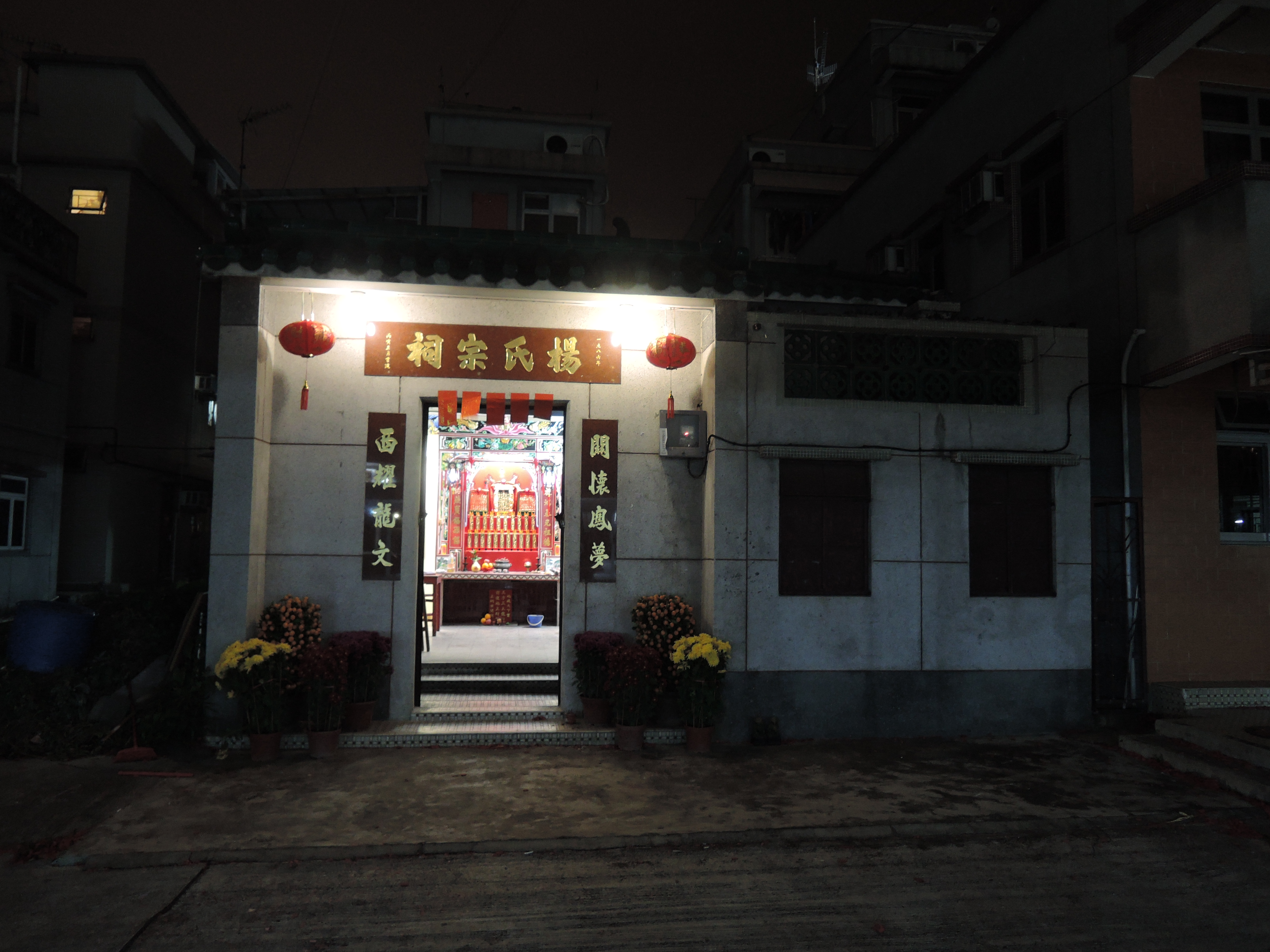
Yeung ancestral hall in Yeung Uk Tsuen

Yeung Uk Tsuen (Chinese: 楊屋村) is a village in Shap Pat Heung, Yuen Long District, Hong Kong.

== Administration ==
Yeung Uk Tsuen is a recognized village under the New Territories Small House Policy. For electoral purposes, Yeung Uk Tsuen is located in the Shap Pat Heung East constituency of the Yuen Long District Council. It was formerly represented by Lee Chun-wai, who was elected in the 2019 elections until July 2021.
